= Bom Jesus, Paraíba =

Coordinates: 6.81694°S 38.65°W

- Municipality
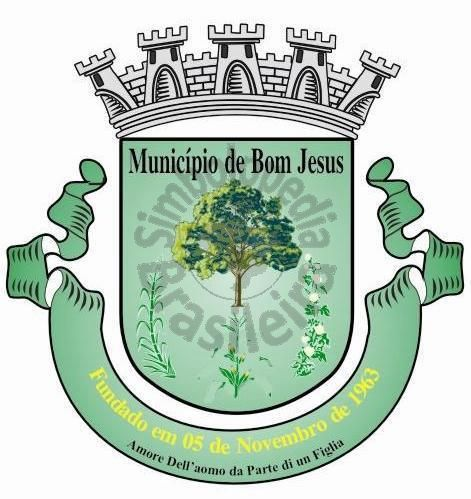
- Flag Coat of arms

- Country: Brazil
- Region: Northeast
- State: Paraíba
- Mesoregion: Sertão Paraibana

Population (2020)
  - Total: 2,575
- Time zone: UTC−3 (BRT)

Bom Jesus, Paraíba is a municipality in the state of Paraíba in the Northeast Region of Brazil.

== See also ==
- List of municipalities in Paraíba
