= Cubati =

- Municipality
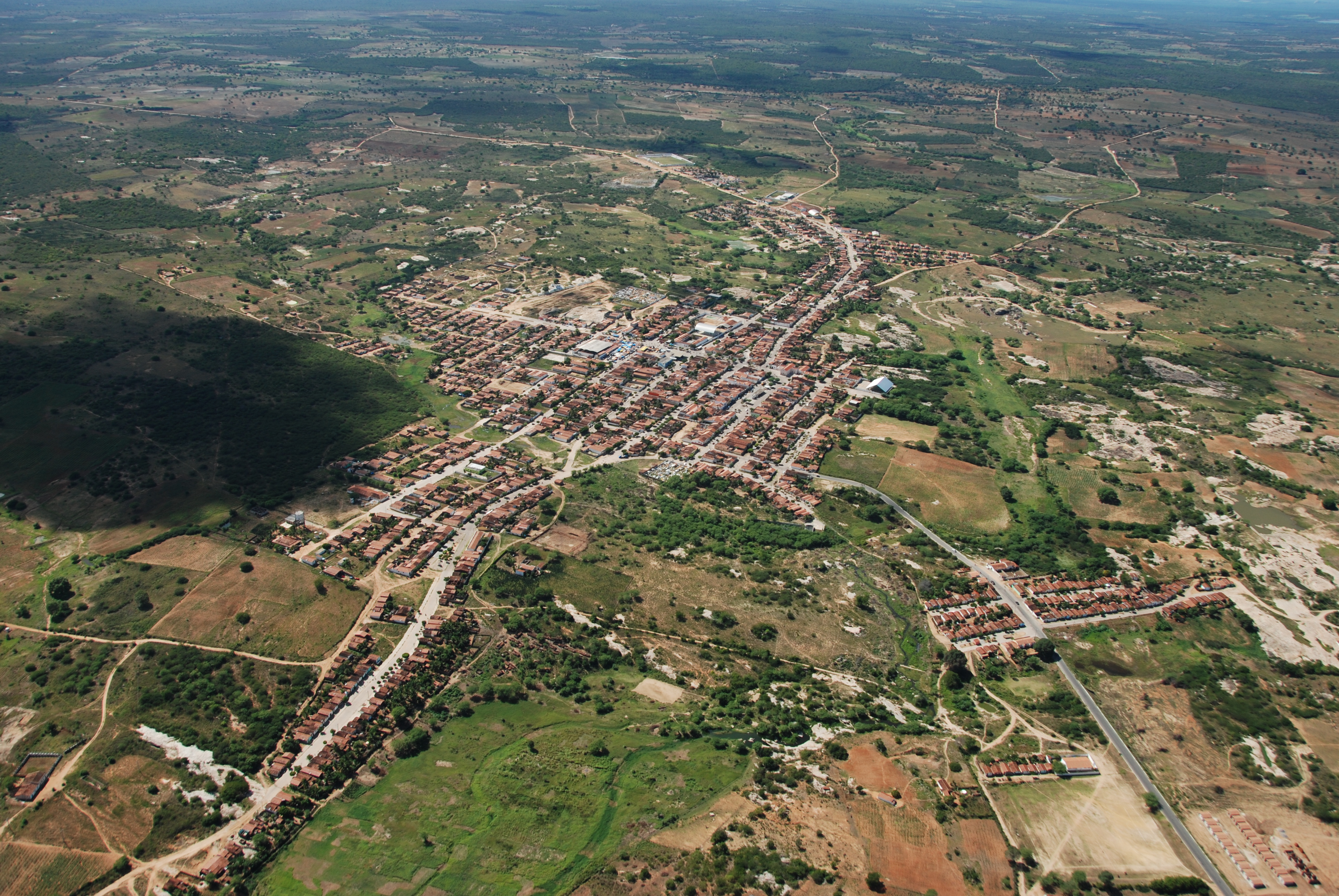
- View of Cubati

- Flag Coat of arms

- Location in Brazil
- Coordinates: 6°51′S 36°21′W
- Country: Brazil
- Region: South
- State: Paraíba
- Mesoregion: Boborema

Population (2020)
  - Municipality: 7,832
- Time zone: UTC−3 (BRT)

Cubati is a municipality in the state of Paraíba in the Northeast Region of Brazil.

== See also ==
- List of municipalities in Paraíba
