= Alagoinha, Paraíba =

Coordinates: 6°57′00″S 35°32′42″W

- Municipality
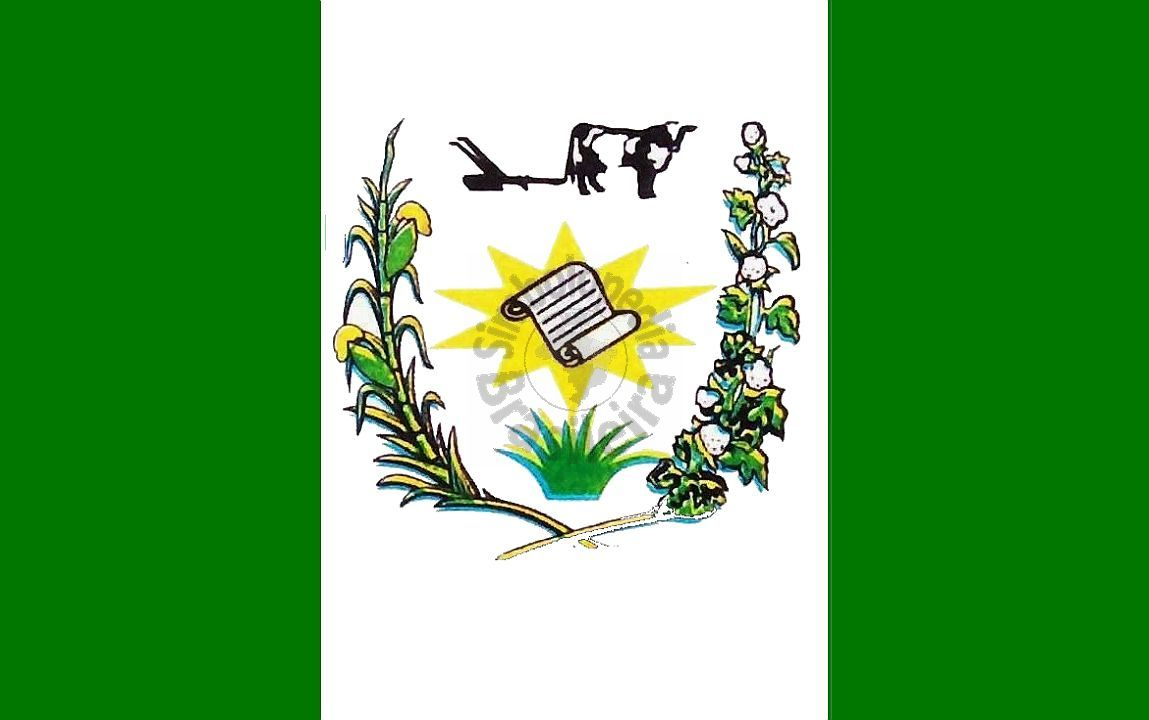
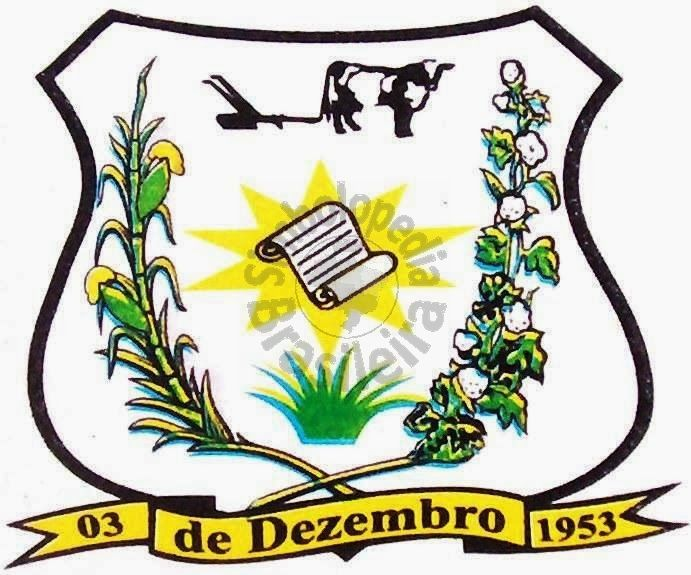
- Flag Coat of arms
- Interactive map of Alagoinha, Paraíba
- Country: Brazil
- Region: Northeast
- State: Paraíba
- Mesoregion: Agreste Paraibano

Population (2020)
  - Total: 14,560
- Time zone: UTC−3 (BRT)

Alagoinha (Central northeastern portuguese pronunciation: [ɐlɐɡoˈĩj̃ɐ]) is a municipality in the state of Paraíba in the Northeast Region of Brazil.

== See also ==
- List of municipalities in Paraíba
