= Brejo dos Santos =

Brejo dos Santos (Paraíba)
- Municipality
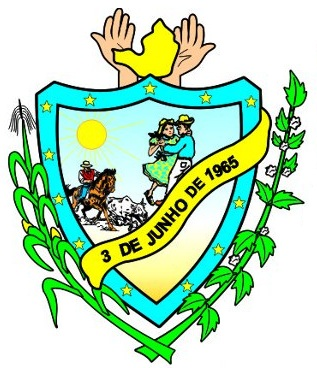
- Flag Coat of arms

- Location in Brazil
- Coordinates: 6.37694°S 37.825°W
- Country: Brazil
- Region: Northeast
- State: Paraíba
- Mesoregion: Sertao Paraibana

Population (2020)
  - Total: 6,464
- Time zone: UTC−3 (BRT)

Brejo dos Santos is a municipality in the state of Paraíba in the Northeast Region of Brazil.

== See also ==
- List of municipalities in Paraíba
