= Logradouro =

Coordinates: 6°36′50″S 35°26′34″W

- Municipality
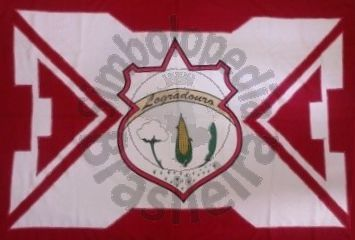
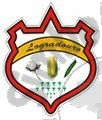
- Flag Coat of arms
- Interactive map of Logradouro
- Country: Brazil
- Region: Northeast
- State: Paraíba
- Mesoregion: Agreste Paraibano

Population (2020)
  - Total: 4,369
- Time zone: UTC−3 (BRT)

Logradouro (Central northeastern portuguese pronunciation: [lɔɡɾɐˈdoɾo]) is a municipality in the state of Paraíba in the Northeast Region of Brazil.

== See also ==
- List of municipalities in Paraíba
