= Mato Grosso, Paraíba =

Coordinates: 6°32′02″S 37°43′30″W

- Municipality
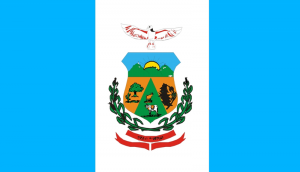
- Flag
- Interactive map of Mato Grosso, Paraíba
- Country: Brazil
- Region: Northeast
- State: Paraíba
- Mesoregion: Sertao Paraibana

Population (2020)
  - Total: 2,926
- Time zone: UTC−3 (BRT)

Mato Grosso, Paraíba is a municipality in the state of Paraíba in the Northeast Region of Brazil.

== See also ==
- List of municipalities in Paraíba
