= Cuité de Mamanguape =

- Municipality
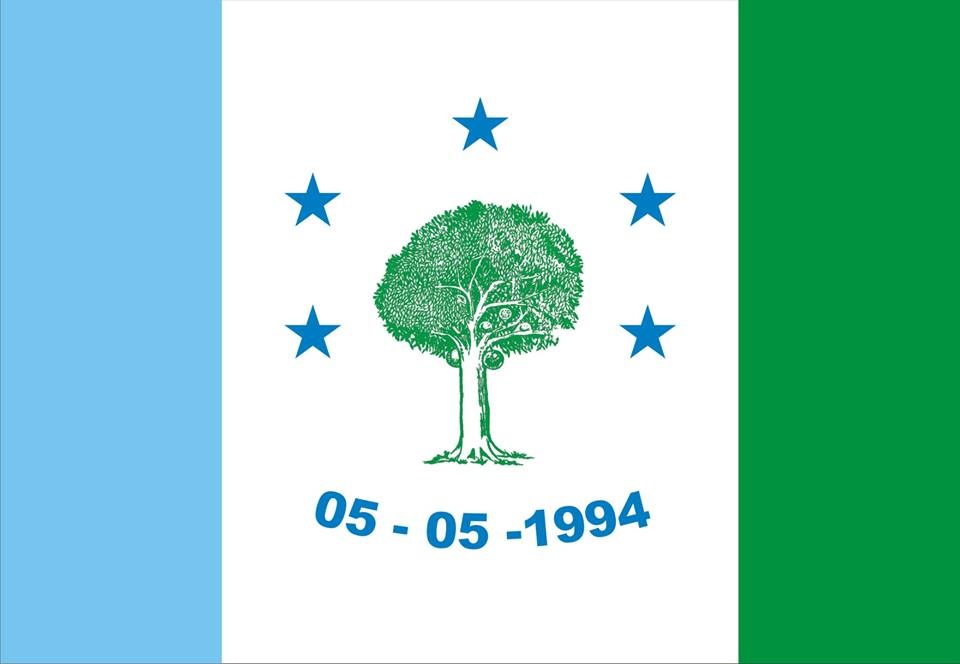
- Flag

- Location in Brazil
- Coordinates: 6.915°S 35.2519°W
- Country: Brazil
- Region: South
- State: Paraíba
- Mesoregion: Mata Paraibana

Population (2020)
  - Total: 6,356
- Time zone: UTC−3 (BRT)

Cuité de Mamanguape is a municipality in the state of Paraíba in the Northeast Region of Brazil.

== See also ==
- List of municipalities in Paraíba
