= List of municipalities in Paraíba =

This is a list of the municipalities in the state of Paraíba (PB), located in the Northeast Region of Brazil. Paraíba is divided into 223 municipalities, which are grouped into 23 microregions, which are grouped into 4 mesoregions.

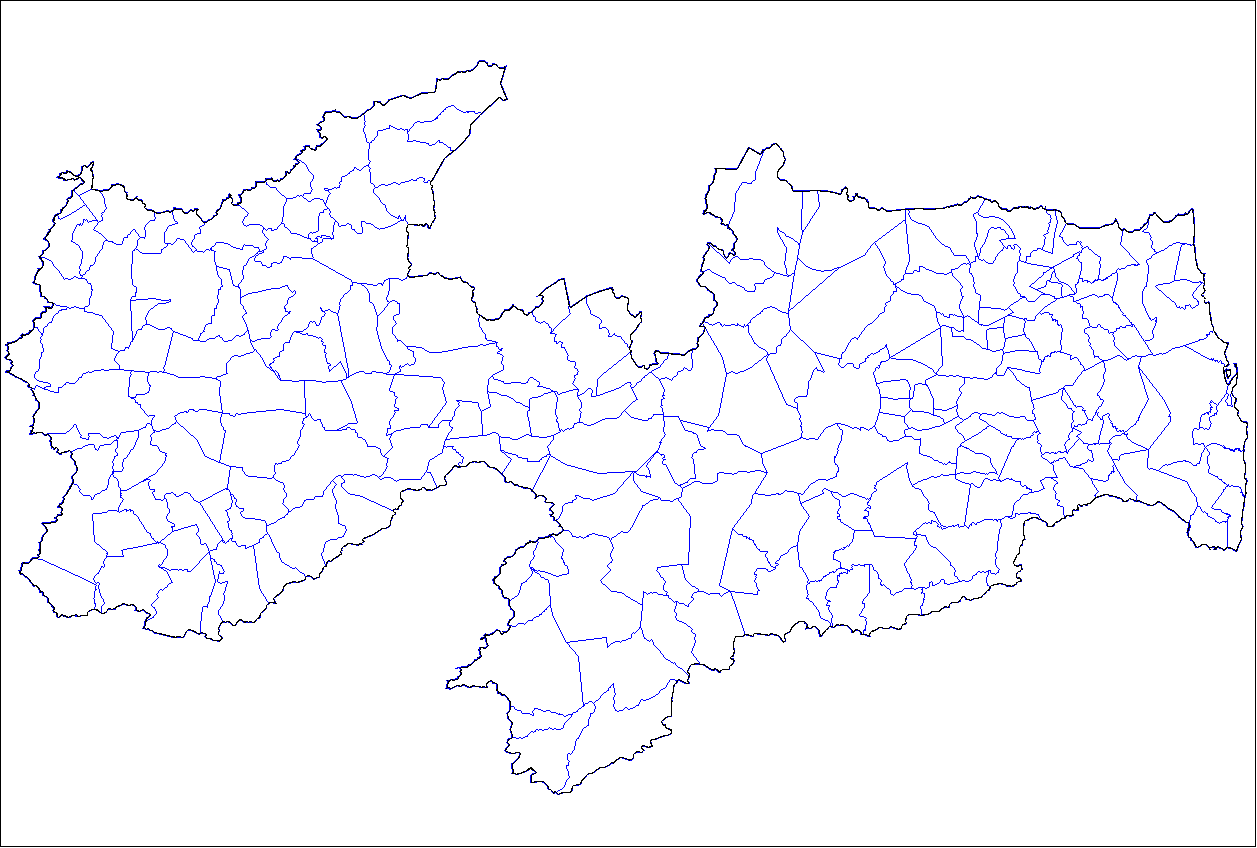
Municipalities of Paraiba, Brazil

Mesoregion	Microregion	Municipality
Agreste Paraibano	Brejo Paraibano	Alagoa Grande
Agreste Paraibano	Brejo Paraibano	Alagoa Nova
Agreste Paraibano	Brejo Paraibano	Areia
Agreste Paraibano	Brejo Paraibano	Bananeiras
Agreste Paraibano	Brejo Paraibano	Borborema
Agreste Paraibano	Brejo Paraibano	Matinhas
Agreste Paraibano	Brejo Paraibano	Pilões
Agreste Paraibano	Brejo Paraibano	Serraria
Agreste Paraibano	Campina Grande	Boa Vista
Agreste Paraibano	Campina Grande	Campina Grande
Agreste Paraibano	Campina Grande	Fagundes
Agreste Paraibano	Campina Grande	Lagoa Seca
Agreste Paraibano	Campina Grande	Massaranduba
Agreste Paraibano	Campina Grande	Puxinanã
Agreste Paraibano	Campina Grande	Queimadas
Agreste Paraibano	Campina Grande	Serra Redonda
Agreste Paraibano	Curimatau Ocidental	Algodão de Jandaíra
Agreste Paraibano	Curimatau Ocidental	Arara
Agreste Paraibano	Curimatau Ocidental	Barra de Santa Rosa
Agreste Paraibano	Curimatau Ocidental	Cuité
Agreste Paraibano	Curimatau Ocidental	Damião
Agreste Paraibano	Curimatau Ocidental	Nova Floresta
Agreste Paraibano	Curimatau Ocidental	Olivedos
Agreste Paraibano	Curimatau Ocidental	Pocinhos
Agreste Paraibano	Curimatau Ocidental	Remígio
Agreste Paraibano	Curimatau Ocidental	Soledade
Agreste Paraibano	Curimatau Ocidental	Sossêgo
Agreste Paraibano	Curimatau Oriental	Araruna
Agreste Paraibano	Curimatau Oriental	Cacimba de Dentro
Agreste Paraibano	Curimatau Oriental	Casserengue
Agreste Paraibano	Curimatau Oriental	Dona Inês
Agreste Paraibano	Curimatau Oriental	Riachão
Agreste Paraibano	Curimatau Oriental	Solânea
Agreste Paraibano	Curimatau Oriental	Tacima
Agreste Paraibano	Esperança	Areial
Agreste Paraibano	Esperança	Esperança
Agreste Paraibano	Esperança	Montadas
Agreste Paraibano	Esperança	São Sebastião de Lagoa de Roça
Agreste Paraibano	Guarabira	Alagoinha
Agreste Paraibano	Guarabira	Araçagi
Agreste Paraibano	Guarabira	Belém
Agreste Paraibano	Guarabira	Caiçara
Agreste Paraibano	Guarabira	Cuitegi
Agreste Paraibano	Guarabira	Duas Estradas
Agreste Paraibano	Guarabira	Guarabira
Agreste Paraibano	Guarabira	Lagoa de Dentro
Agreste Paraibano	Guarabira	Logradouro
Agreste Paraibano	Guarabira	Mulungu
Agreste Paraibano	Guarabira	Pilõezinhos
Agreste Paraibano	Guarabira	Pirpirituba
Agreste Paraibano	Guarabira	Serra da Raiz
Agreste Paraibano	Guarabira	Sertãozinho
Agreste Paraibano	Itabaiana	Caldas Brandão
Agreste Paraibano	Itabaiana	Gurinhém
Agreste Paraibano	Itabaiana	Ingá
Agreste Paraibano	Itabaiana	Itabaiana
Agreste Paraibano	Itabaiana	Itatuba
Agreste Paraibano	Itabaiana	Juarez Távora
Agreste Paraibano	Itabaiana	Mogeiro
Agreste Paraibano	Itabaiana	Riachão do Bacamarte
Agreste Paraibano	Itabaiana	Salgado de São Félix
Agreste Paraibano	Umbuzeiro	Aroeiras
Agreste Paraibano	Umbuzeiro	Gado Bravo
Agreste Paraibano	Umbuzeiro	Natuba
Agreste Paraibano	Umbuzeiro	Santa Cecília
Agreste Paraibano	Umbuzeiro	Umbuzeiro
Borborema	Cariri Ocidental	Amparo
Borborema	Cariri Ocidental	Assunção
Borborema	Cariri Ocidental	Camalaú
Borborema	Cariri Ocidental	Congo
Borborema	Cariri Ocidental	Coxixola
Borborema	Cariri Ocidental	Livramento
Borborema	Cariri Ocidental	Monteiro
Borborema	Cariri Ocidental	Ouro Velho
Borborema	Cariri Ocidental	Parari
Borborema	Cariri Ocidental	Prata
Borborema	Cariri Ocidental	São João do Tigre
Borborema	Cariri Ocidental	São José dos Cordeiros
Borborema	Cariri Ocidental	São Sebastião do Umbuzeiro
Borborema	Cariri Ocidental	Serra Branca
Borborema	Cariri Ocidental	Sumé
Borborema	Cariri Ocidental	Taperoá
Borborema	Cariri Ocidental	Zabelê
Borborema	Cariri Oriental	Alcantil
Borborema	Cariri Oriental	Barra de Santana
Borborema	Cariri Oriental	Barra de São Miguel
Borborema	Cariri Oriental	Boqueirão
Borborema	Cariri Oriental	Cabaceiras
Borborema	Cariri Oriental	Caraúbas
Borborema	Cariri Oriental	Caturité
Borborema	Cariri Oriental	Gurjão
Borborema	Cariri Oriental	Riacho de Santo Antônio
Borborema	Cariri Oriental	Santo André
Borborema	Cariri Oriental	São Domingos do Cariri
Borborema	Cariri Oriental	São João do Cariri
Borborema	Seridó Ocidental Paraibano	Junco do Seridó
Borborema	Seridó Ocidental Paraibano	Salgadinho
Borborema	Seridó Ocidental Paraibano	Santa Luzia
Borborema	Seridó Ocidental Paraibano	São José do Sabugi
Borborema	Seridó Ocidental Paraibano	São Mamede
Borborema	Seridó Ocidental Paraibano	Várzea
Borborema	Seridó Oriental Paraibano	Baraúna
Borborema	Seridó Oriental Paraibano	Cubati
Borborema	Seridó Oriental Paraibano	Frei Martinho
Borborema	Seridó Oriental Paraibano	Juazeirinho
Borborema	Seridó Oriental Paraibano	Nova Palmeira
Borborema	Seridó Oriental Paraibano	Pedra Lavrada
Borborema	Seridó Oriental Paraibano	Picuí
Borborema	Seridó Oriental Paraibano	São Vicente do Seridó
Borborema	Seridó Oriental Paraibano	Tenório
Mata Paraibana	João Pessoa	Bayeux
Mata Paraibana	João Pessoa	Cabedelo
Mata Paraibana	João Pessoa	Conde
Mata Paraibana	João Pessoa	João Pessoa (State Capital)
Mata Paraibana	João Pessoa	Lucena
Mata Paraibana	João Pessoa	Santa Rita
Mata Paraibana	Litoral Norte	Baía da Traição
Mata Paraibana	Litoral Norte	Capim
Mata Paraibana	Litoral Norte	Cuité de Mamanguape
Mata Paraibana	Litoral Norte	Curral de Cima
Mata Paraibana	Litoral Norte	Itapororoca
Mata Paraibana	Litoral Norte	Jacaraú
Mata Paraibana	Litoral Norte	Mamanguape
Mata Paraibana	Litoral Norte	Marcação
Mata Paraibana	Litoral Norte	Mataraca
Mata Paraibana	Litoral Norte	Pedro Régis
Mata Paraibana	Litoral Norte	Rio Tinto
Mata Paraibana	Litoral Sul	Alhandra
Mata Paraibana	Litoral Sul	Caaporã
Mata Paraibana	Litoral Sul	Pedras de Fogo
Mata Paraibana	Litoral Sul	Pitimbu
Mata Paraibana	Sapé	Cruz do Espírito Santo
Mata Paraibana	Sapé	Juripiranga
Mata Paraibana	Sapé	Mari
Mata Paraibana	Sapé	Pilar
Mata Paraibana	Sapé	Riachão do Poço
Mata Paraibana	Sapé	São José dos Ramos
Mata Paraibana	Sapé	São Miguel de Taipu
Mata Paraibana	Sapé	Sapé
Mata Paraibana	Sapé	Sobrado
Sertão Paraibano	Cajazeiras	Bernardino Batista
Sertão Paraibano	Cajazeiras	Bom Jesus
Sertão Paraibano	Cajazeiras	Bonito de Santa Fé
Sertão Paraibano	Cajazeiras	Cachoeira dos Índios
Sertão Paraibano	Cajazeiras	Cajazeiras
Sertão Paraibano	Cajazeiras	Carrapateira
Sertão Paraibano	Cajazeiras	Joca Claudino
Sertão Paraibano	Cajazeiras	Monte Horebe
Sertão Paraibano	Cajazeiras	Poço Dantas
Sertão Paraibano	Cajazeiras	Poço de José de Moura
Sertão Paraibano	Cajazeiras	Santa Helena
Sertão Paraibano	Cajazeiras	São João do Rio do Peixe
Sertão Paraibano	Cajazeiras	São José de Piranhas
Sertão Paraibano	Cajazeiras	Triunfo
Sertão Paraibano	Cajazeiras	Uiraúna
Sertão Paraibano	Catolé do Rocha	Belém do Brejo do Cruz
Sertão Paraibano	Catolé do Rocha	Bom Sucesso
Sertão Paraibano	Catolé do Rocha	Brejo do Cruz
Sertão Paraibano	Catolé do Rocha	Brejo dos Santos
Sertão Paraibano	Catolé do Rocha	Catolé do Rocha
Sertão Paraibano	Catolé do Rocha	Jericó
Sertão Paraibano	Catolé do Rocha	Lagoa
Sertão Paraibano	Catolé do Rocha	Mato Grosso
Sertão Paraibano	Catolé do Rocha	Riacho dos Cavalos
Sertão Paraibano	Catolé do Rocha	São Bento
Sertão Paraibano	Catolé do Rocha	São José do Brejo do Cruz
Sertão Paraibano	Itaporanga	Boa Ventura
Sertão Paraibano	Itaporanga	Conceição
Sertão Paraibano	Itaporanga	Curral Velho
Sertão Paraibano	Itaporanga	Diamante
Sertão Paraibano	Itaporanga	Ibiara
Sertão Paraibano	Itaporanga	Itaporanga
Sertão Paraibano	Itaporanga	Pedra Branca
Sertão Paraibano	Itaporanga	Santa Inês
Sertão Paraibano	Itaporanga	Santana de Mangueira
Sertão Paraibano	Itaporanga	São José de Caiana
Sertão Paraibano	Itaporanga	Serra Grande
Sertão Paraibano	Patos	Areia de Baraúnas
Sertão Paraibano	Patos	Cacimba de Areia
Sertão Paraibano	Patos	Mãe d'Água
Sertão Paraibano	Patos	Passagem
Sertão Paraibano	Patos	Patos
Sertão Paraibano	Patos	Quixabá
Sertão Paraibano	Patos	Santa Teresinha
Sertão Paraibano	Patos	São José de Espinharas
Sertão Paraibano	Patos	São José do Bonfim
Sertão Paraibano	Piancó	Aguiar
Sertão Paraibano	Piancó	Catingueira
Sertão Paraibano	Piancó	Coremas
Sertão Paraibano	Piancó	Emas
Sertão Paraibano	Piancó	Igaracy
Sertão Paraibano	Piancó	Nova Olinda
Sertão Paraibano	Piancó	Olho d'Água
Sertão Paraibano	Piancó	Piancó
Sertão Paraibano	Piancó	Santana dos Garrotes
Sertão Paraibano	Serra do Teixeira	Água Branca
Sertão Paraibano	Serra do Teixeira	Cacimbas
Sertão Paraibano	Serra do Teixeira	Desterro
Sertão Paraibano	Serra do Teixeira	Imaculada
Sertão Paraibano	Serra do Teixeira	Juru
Sertão Paraibano	Serra do Teixeira	Manaíra
Sertão Paraibano	Serra do Teixeira	Maturéia
Sertão Paraibano	Serra do Teixeira	Princesa Isabel
Sertão Paraibano	Serra do Teixeira	São José de Princesa
Sertão Paraibano	Serra do Teixeira	Tavares
Sertão Paraibano	Serra do Teixeira	Teixeira
Sertão Paraibano	Sousa	Aparecida
Sertão Paraibano	Sousa	Cajazeirinhas
Sertão Paraibano	Sousa	Condado
Sertão Paraibano	Sousa	Lastro
Sertão Paraibano	Sousa	Malta
Sertão Paraibano	Sousa	Marizópolis
Sertão Paraibano	Sousa	Nazarezinho
Sertão Paraibano	Sousa	Paulista
Sertão Paraibano	Sousa	Pombal
Sertão Paraibano	Sousa	Santa Cruz
Sertão Paraibano	Sousa	São Bentinho
Sertão Paraibano	Sousa	São Domingos
Sertão Paraibano	Sousa	São Francisco
Sertão Paraibano	Sousa	São José da Lagoa Tapada
Sertão Paraibano	Sousa	Sousa
Sertão Paraibano	Sousa	Vieirópolis
Sertão Paraibano	Sousa	Vista Serrana

== See also ==
- Geography of Brazil
- List of cities in Brazil
