= Juripiranga =

Coordinates: 7°22′S 35°14′W

- Municipality
- Flag Coat of arms

- Country: Brazil
- Region: Northeast
- State: Paraíba
- Mesoregion: Mata Paraibana

Population (2020)
  - Total: 10,793
- Time zone: UTC−3 (BRT)

Juripiranga is a municipality in the state of Paraíba in the Northeast Region of Brazil.

== See also ==
- List of municipalities in Paraíba
