= Zabelê =

Municipality in Paraíba, Brazil

- Municipality
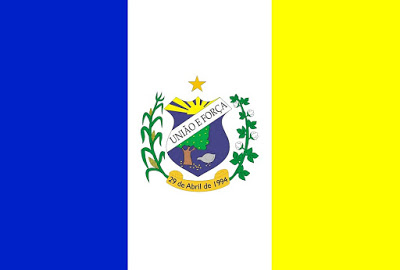
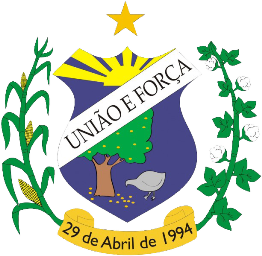
- Flag Coat of arms

- Location in Brazil
- Coordinates: 8°04′33″S 37°05′52″W
- Country: Brazil
- Region: Northeast
- State: Paraíba
- Mesoregion: Boborema

Population (2020)
  - Total: 2,255
- Time zone: UTC−3 (BRT)

Zabelê (Central northeastern portuguese pronunciation: [zɐbeˈle]) is a municipality in the state of Paraíba in the Northeast Region of Brazil.

== See also ==
- List of municipalities in Paraíba
