= Poço de José de Moura =

Coordinates: 6.575°S 38.5119°W

- Municipality
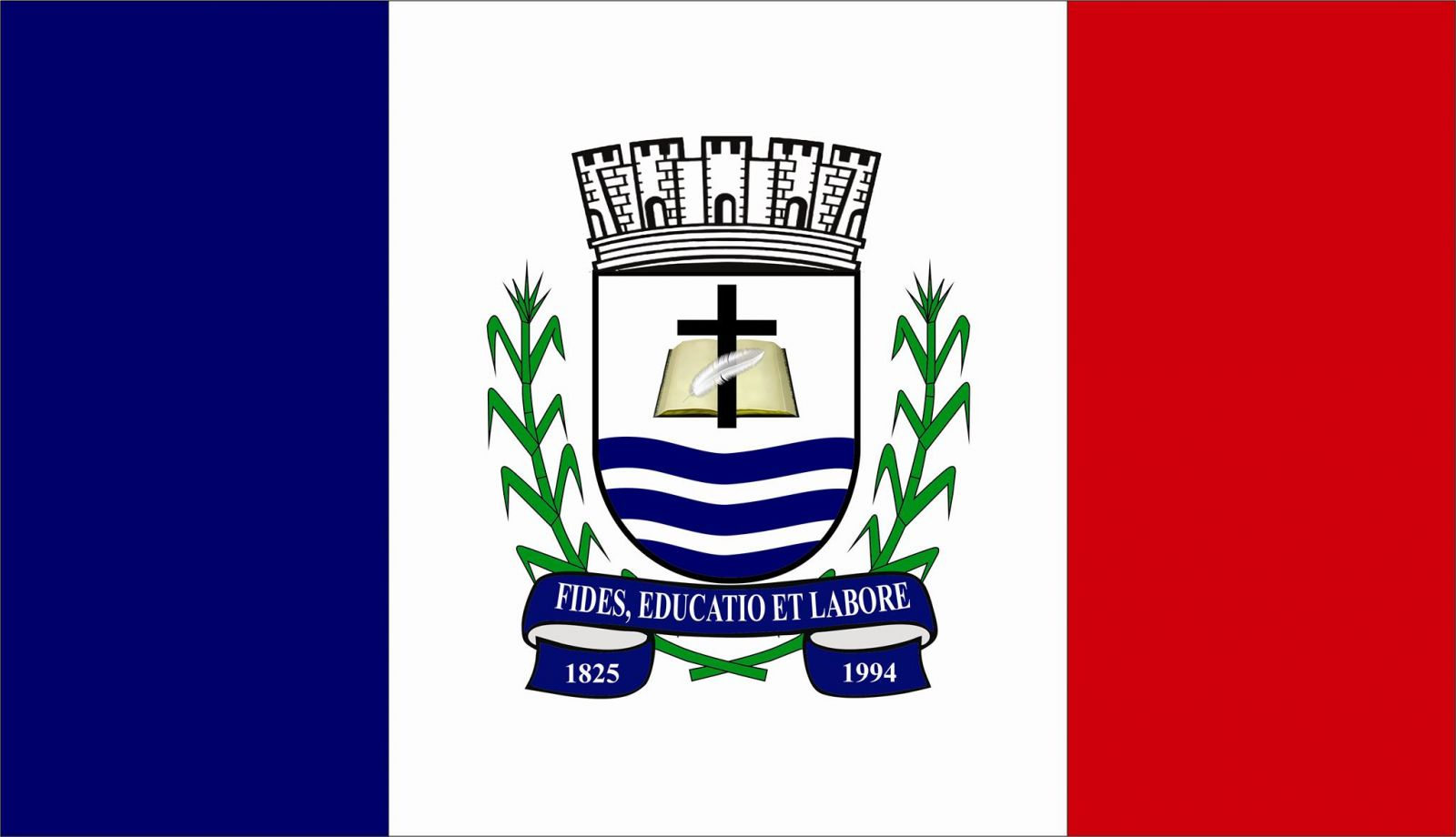
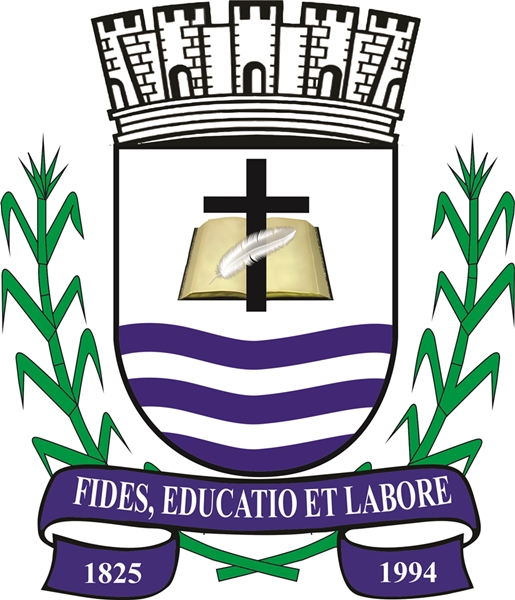
- Flag Coat of arms

- Country: Brazil
- Region: Northeast
- State: Paraíba
- Mesoregion: Sertao Paraibana

Population (2020)
  - Total: 4,337
- Time zone: UTC−3 (BRT)

Poço de José de Moura is a municipality in the state of Paraíba in the Northeast Region of Brazil.

== See also ==
- List of municipalities in Paraíba
