= Sossêgo, Paraíba =

Coordinates: 6°46′08″S 36°15′14″W

- Municipality
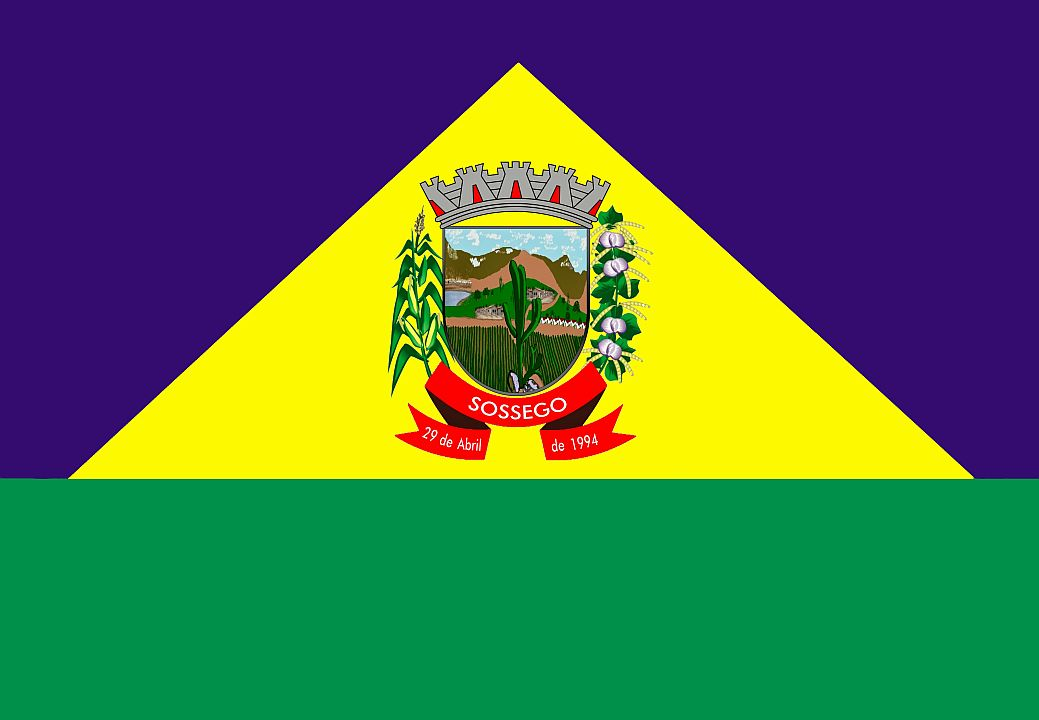
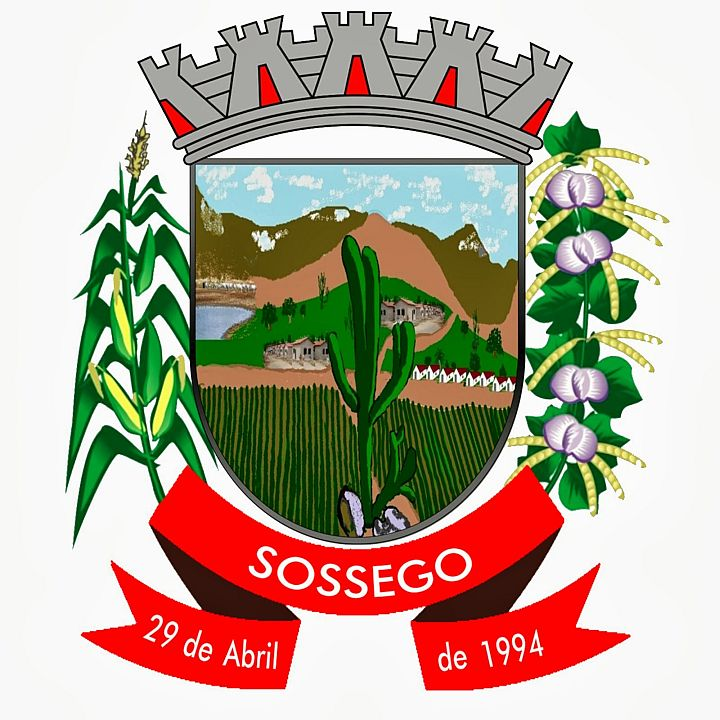
- Flag Coat of arms
- Interactive map of Sossêgo, Paraíba
- Country: Brazil
- Region: Northeast
- State: Paraíba
- Mesoregion: Agreste Paraibano

Population (2020)
  - Total: 3,594
- Time zone: UTC−3 (BRT)

Sossêgo (Central northeastern portuguese pronunciation: [suˈseɡu]) is a municipality in the state of Paraíba in the Northeast Region of Brazil.

== See also ==
- List of municipalities in Paraíba
