= Puxinanã =

Coordinates: 7.16083°S 35.9608°W

- Municipality
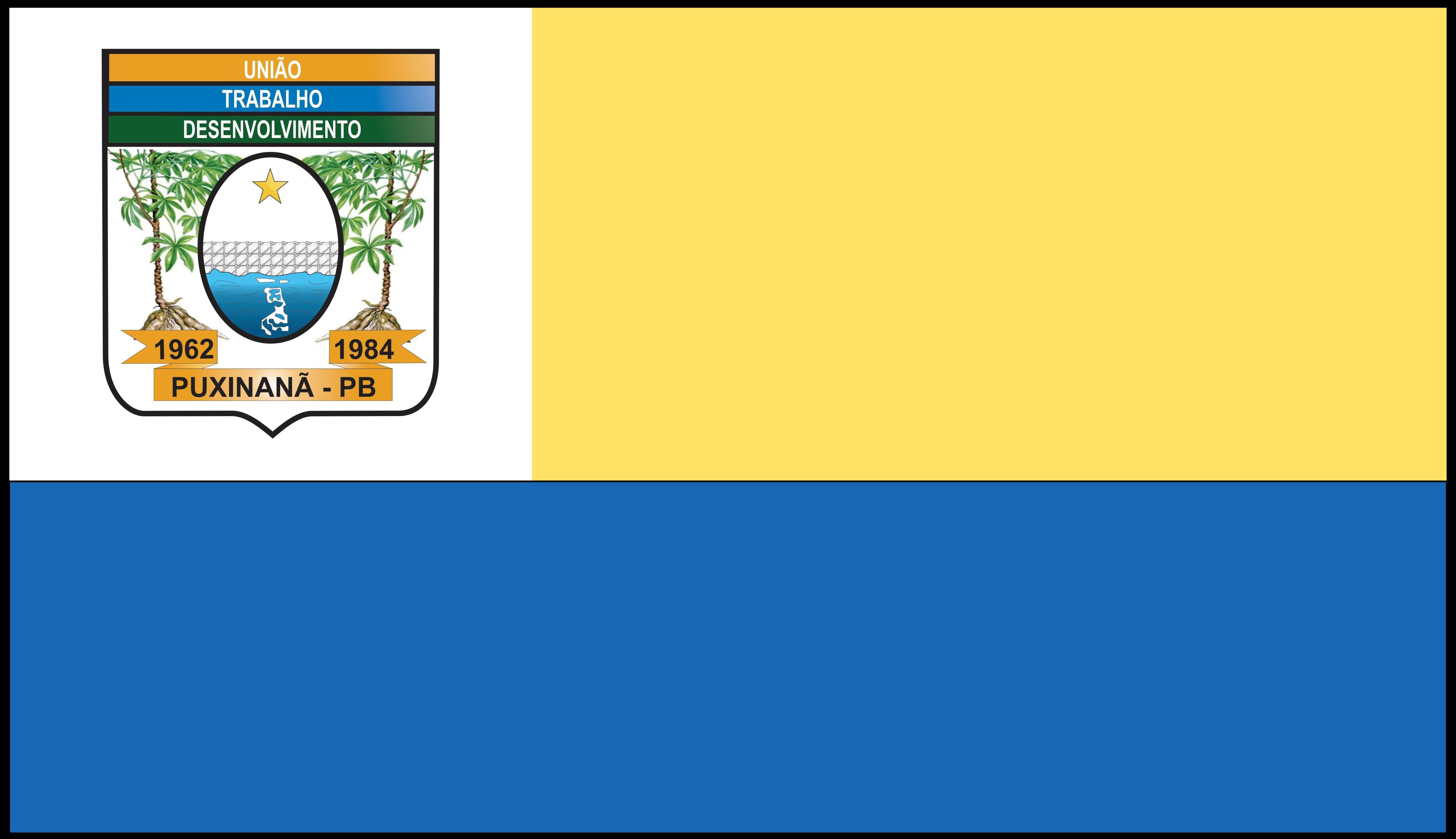
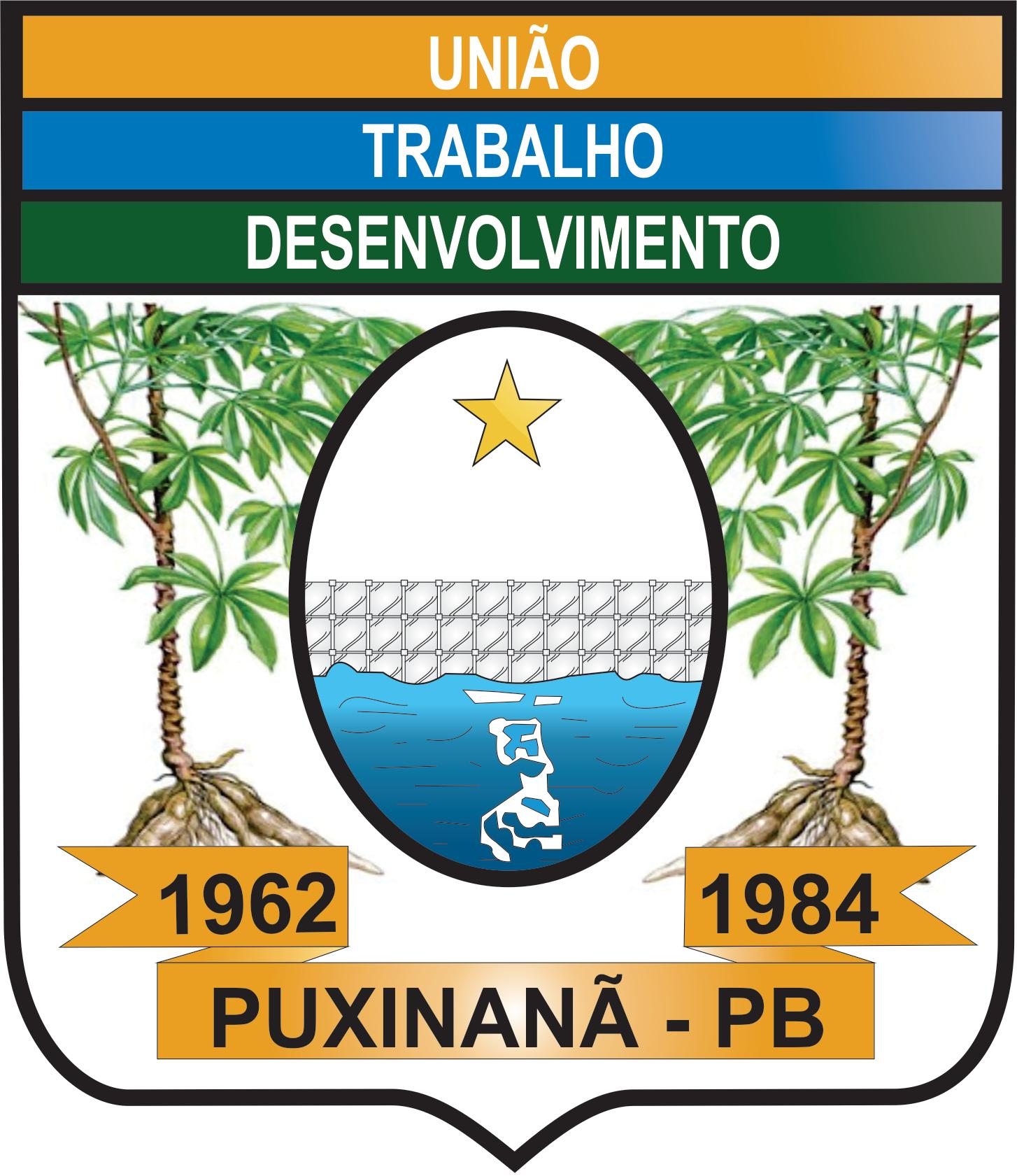
- Flag Coat of arms
- Interactive map of Puxinanã
- Country: Brazil
- Region: South
- State: Paraíba
- Mesoregion: Agreste Paraibano

Population (2020)
  - Total: 13,741
- Time zone: UTC−3 (BRT)

Puxinanã (Central northeastern portuguese pronunciation: [puʃinɐˈnɐ̃]) is a municipality in the state of Paraíba in the Northeast Region of Brazil.

== See also ==
- List of municipalities in Paraíba
