= Amparo, Paraíba =

Coordinates: 7°34′04″S 37°03′50″W

- Municipality
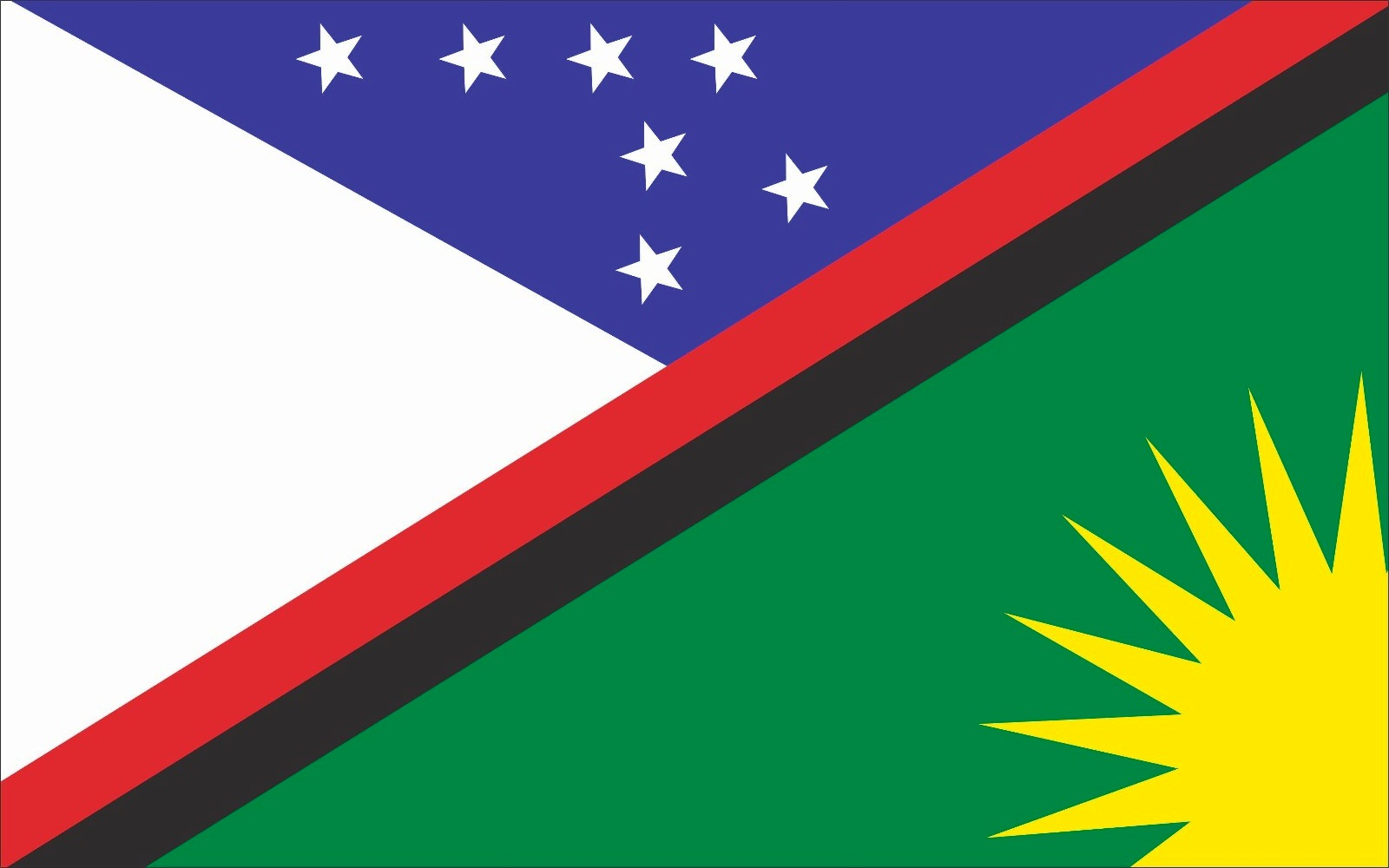
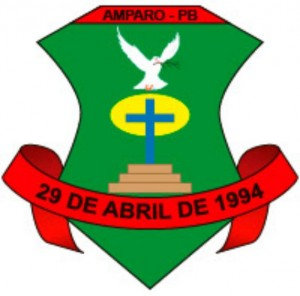
- Flag Coat of arms

- Country: Brazil
- Region: South
- State: Paraíba
- Mesoregion: Boborema

Population (2020)
  - Total: 2,251
- Time zone: UTC−3 (BRT)

Amparo (Central northeastern portuguese pronunciation: [ɐ̃ˈpaɾu]) is a municipality in the state of Paraíba in the Northeast Region of Brazil.

== See also ==
- List of municipalities in Paraíba
