= São José do Bonfim =

Coordinates: 7.16278°S 37.3089°W

- Municipality
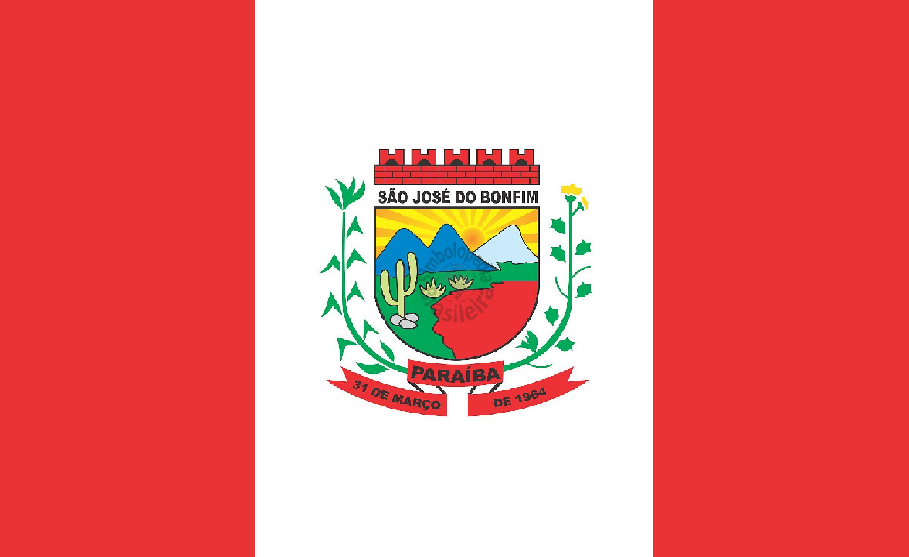
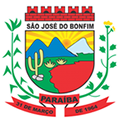
- Flag Coat of arms
- Interactive map of São José do Bonfim
- Country: Brazil
- Region: Northeast
- State: Paraíba
- Mesoregion: Sertao Paraibana

Population (2020)
  - Total: 3,588
- Time zone: UTC−3 (BRT)

São José do Bonfim is a municipality in the state of Paraíba in the Northeast Region of Brazil.

== See also ==
- List of municipalities in Paraíba
