= Quixabá, Paraíba =

Coordinates: 7°01′51″S 37°08′56″W

- Municipality
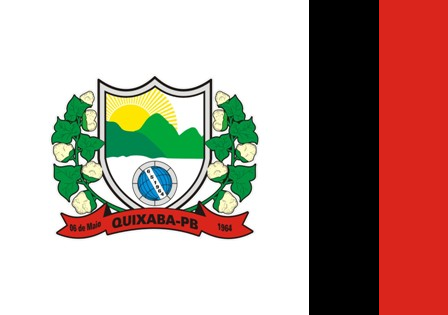
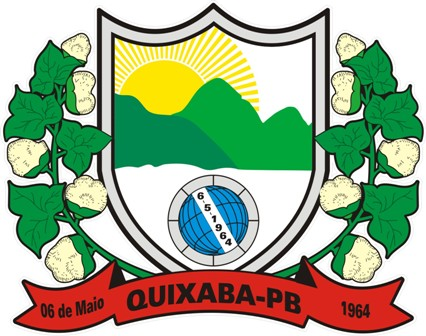
- Flag Coat of arms
- Interactive map of Quixabá, Paraíba
- Country: Brazil
- Region: Northeast
- State: Paraíba
- Mesoregion: Sertao Paraibana

Population (2020)
  - Total: 1,983
- Time zone: UTC−3 (BRT)

Quixabá, Paraíba is a municipality in the state of Paraíba in the Northeast Region of Brazil.

== See also ==
- List of municipalities in Paraíba
