= São Bentinho =

Coordinates: 17°28′S 41°53′W

- Municipality
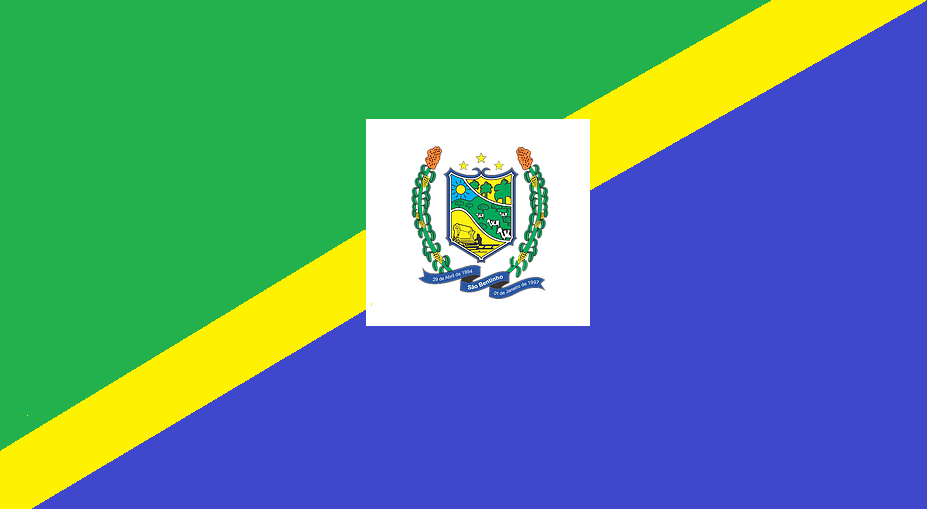
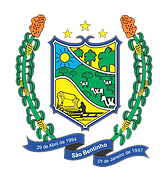
- Flag Coat of arms
- Interactive map of São Bentinho
- Country: Brazil
- Region: Northeast
- State: Paraíba
- Mesoregion: Sertao Paraibana

Population (2020)
  - Total: 4,566
- Time zone: UTC−3 (BRT)

São Bentinho is a municipality in the state of Paraíba in the Northeast Region of Brazil.

== See also ==
- List of municipalities in Paraíba
