= Riacho dos Cavalos =

Coordinates: 6.44278°S 37.6508°W

- Municipality
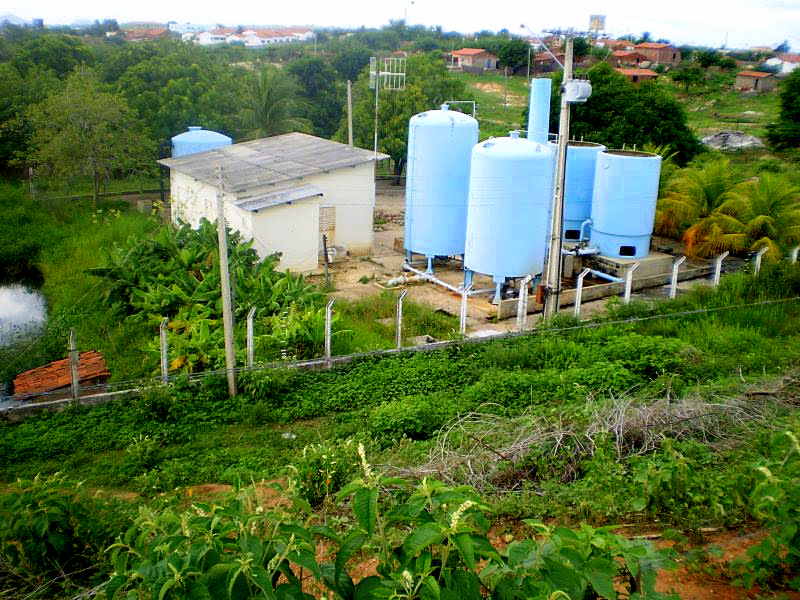

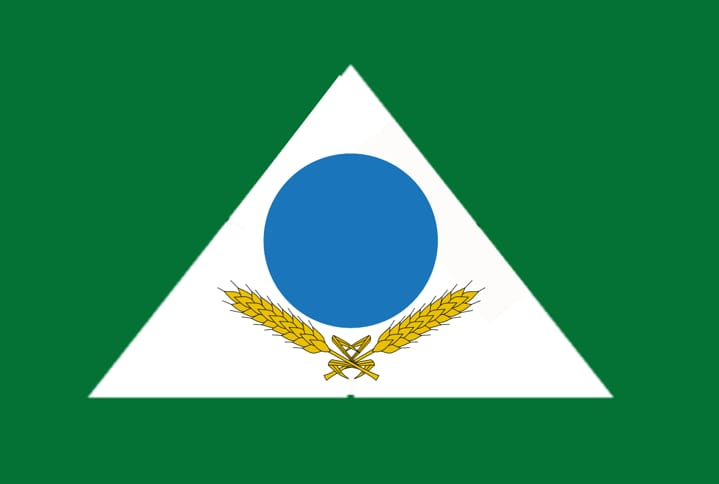
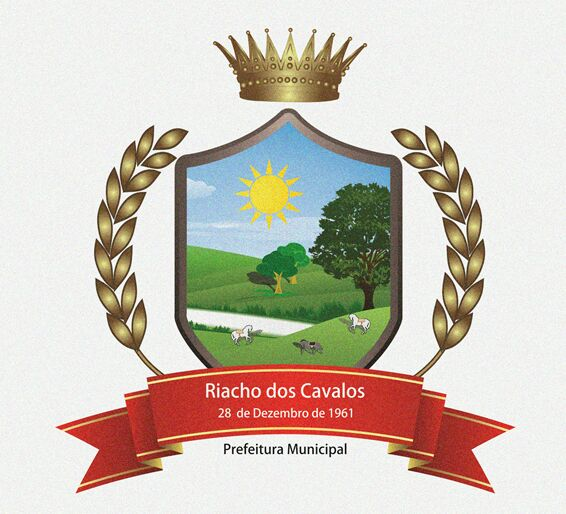
- Flag Coat of arms
- Interactive map of Riacho dos Cavalos
- Country: Brazil
- Region: Northeast
- State: Paraíba
- Mesoregion: Sertao Paraibana

Population (2020)
  - Total: 8,541
- Time zone: UTC−3 (BRT)

Riacho dos Cavalos is a municipality in the state of Paraíba in the Northeast Region of Brazil.

== See also ==
- List of municipalities in Paraíba
