= Gurinhém =

Coordinates: 7°08′S 35°27′W

- Municipality
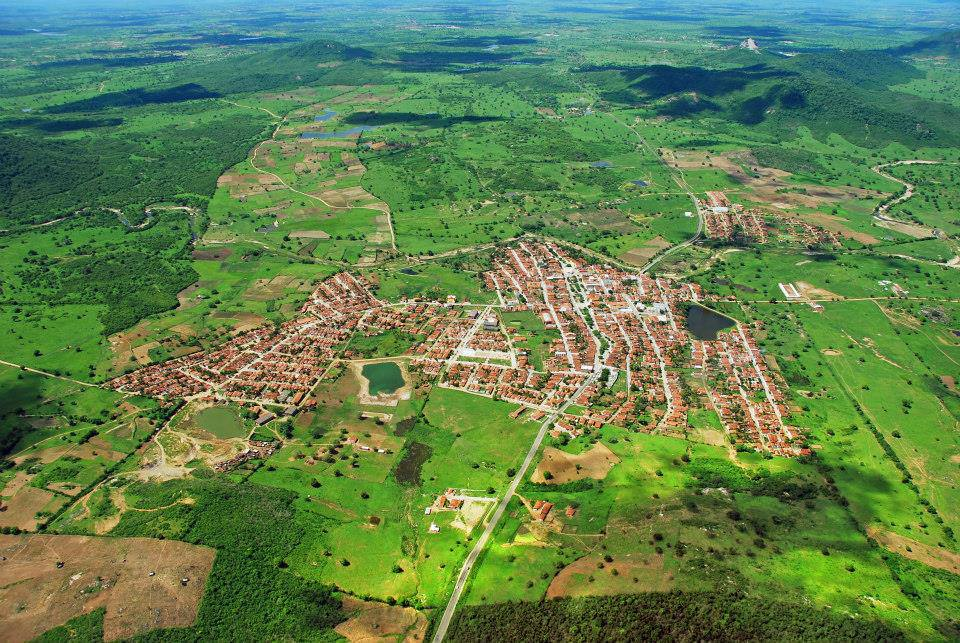
- View of Gurinhém

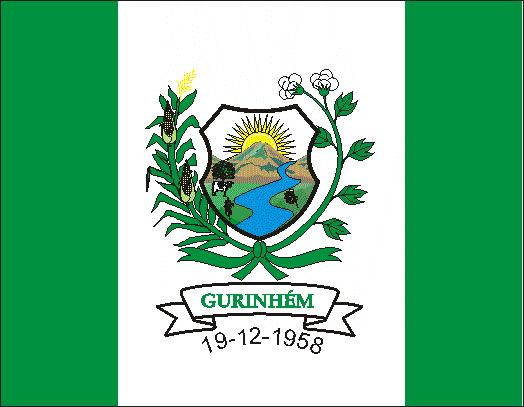
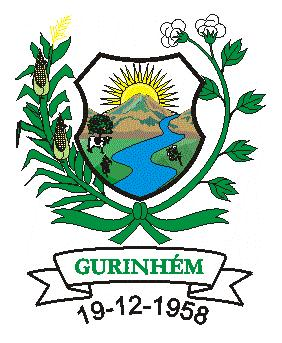
- Flag Coat of arms
- Interactive map of Gurinhém
- Country: Brazil
- Region: South
- State: Paraíba
- Mesoregion: Agreste Paraibano

Population (2020)
  - Total: 14,127
- Time zone: UTC−3 (BRT)

Gurinhém (Central northeastern portuguese pronunciation: [ɡuɾiˈj̃ẽj̃]) is a municipality in the state of Paraíba in the Northeast Region of Brazil.

== See also ==
- List of municipalities in Paraíba
