= Santana de Mangueira =

Coordinates: 7°33′S 38°20′W

- Municipality
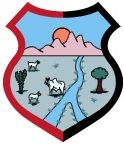
- Coat of arms
- Interactive map of Santana de Mangueira
- Country: Brazil
- Region: Northeast
- State: Paraíba
- Mesoregion: Sertao Paraibana

Population (2020)
  - Total: 5,129
- Time zone: UTC−3 (BRT)

Santana de Mangueira is a municipality in the state of Paraíba in the Northeast Region of Brazil.

== See also ==
- List of municipalities in Paraíba
