= Capim =

- Municipality
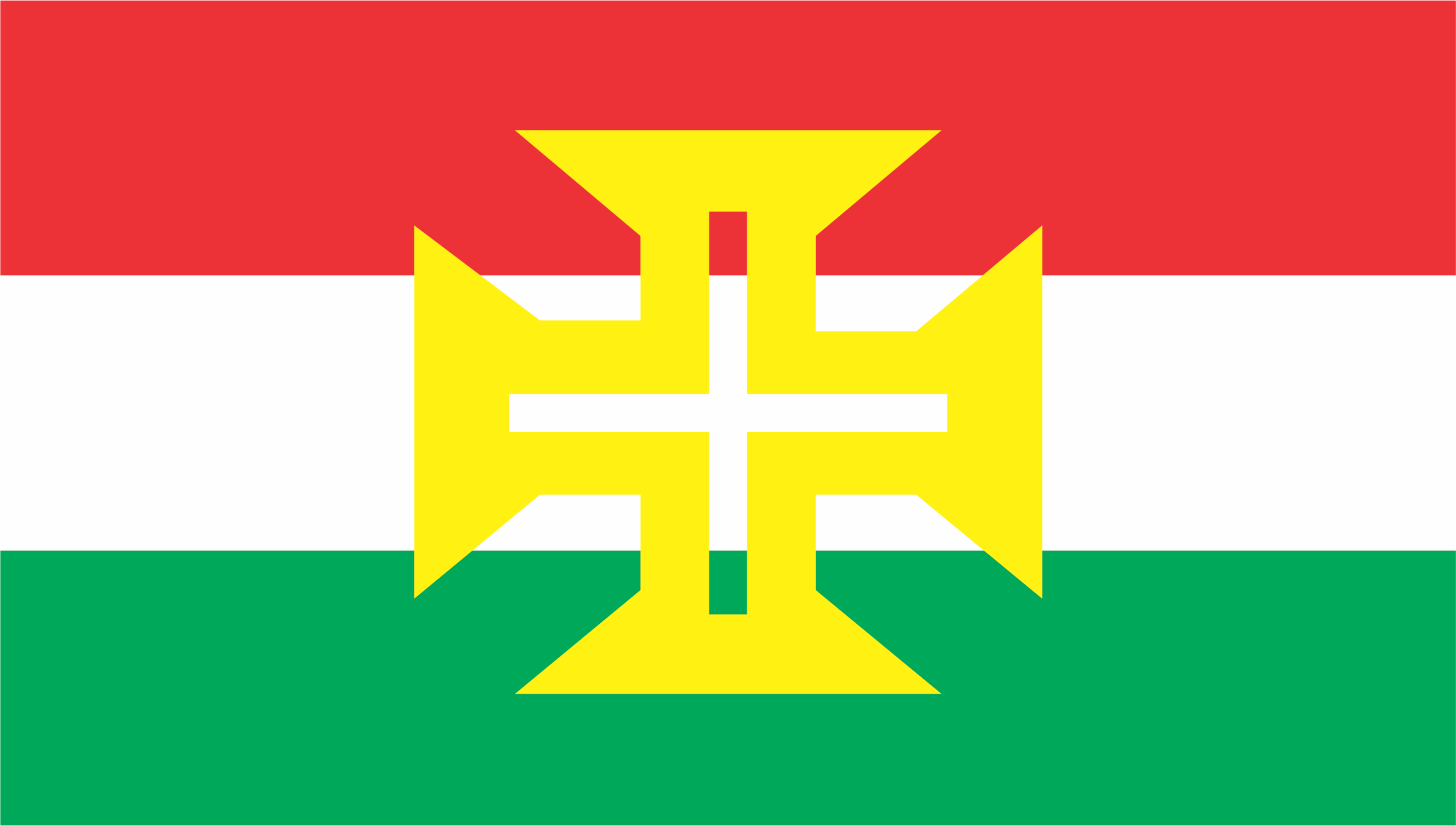
- Flag Coat of arms

- Location in Brazil
- Coordinates: 6°54′57″S 35°10′19″W
- Country: Brazil
- Region: South
- State: Paraíba
- Mesoregion: Mata Paraibana

Population (2020)
  - Total: 6,620
- Time zone: UTC−3 (BRT)

Capim is a municipality in the state of Paraíba in the Northeast Region of Brazil.

== See also ==
- List of municipalities in Paraíba
