= Olho d'Água =

Coordinates: 7°13′40″S 37°45′03″W

- Municipality
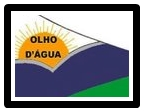
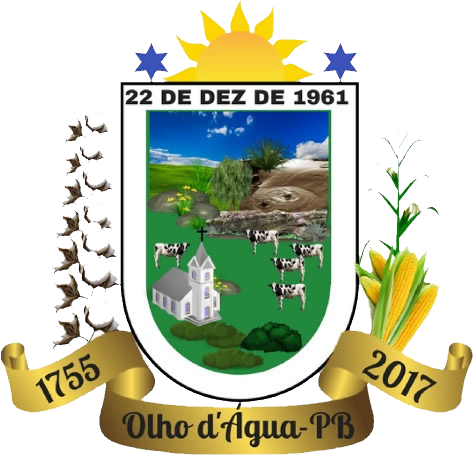
- Flag Coat of arms
- Interactive map of Olho d'Água
- Country: Brazil
- Region: Northeast
- State: Paraíba
- Mesoregion: Sertao Paraibana

Population (2020)
  - Total: 6,462
- Time zone: UTC−3 (BRT)

Olho d'Água is a municipality in the state of Paraíba in the Northeast Region of Brazil.

== Demographics ==
According to the 2020 IBGE statistics, 6,462 people live in this municipality.

== Attractions ==
In the Recanto Ecológico Rio da Prata wildlife park, the Olho D'Água river gets flooded every seven years, submerging the local hiking trails. This has become an attractive venue for divers.

== See also ==
- List of municipalities in Paraíba
