= Assunção, Paraíba =

Coordinates: 7°04′26″S 36°43′51″W

- Municipality
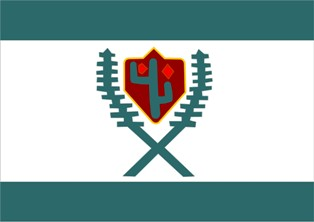
- Flag
- Interactive map of Assunção, Paraíba
- Country: Brazil
- Region: South
- State: Paraíba
- Mesoregion: Boborema

Population (2020)
  - Total: 4,029
- Time zone: UTC−3 (BRT)

Assunção (Central northeastern portuguese pronunciation: [ɐsũˈsɐ̃w]) is a municipality in the state of Paraíba in the Northeast Region of Brazil.

== See also ==
- List of municipalities in Paraíba
