= Ibiara =

Coordinates: 7°30′S 38°25′W

- Municipality
- Flag
- Interactive map of Ibiara
- Country: Brazil
- Region: Northeast
- State: Paraíba
- Mesoregion: Sertao Paraibana

Population (2020)
  - Total: 5,903
- Time zone: UTC−3 (BRT)

Ibiara is a municipality in the state of Paraíba in the Northeast Region of Brazil.

== See also ==
- List of municipalities in Paraíba
