= Borborema, Paraíba =

Coordinates: 6°48′03″S 35°37′33″W

- Municipality
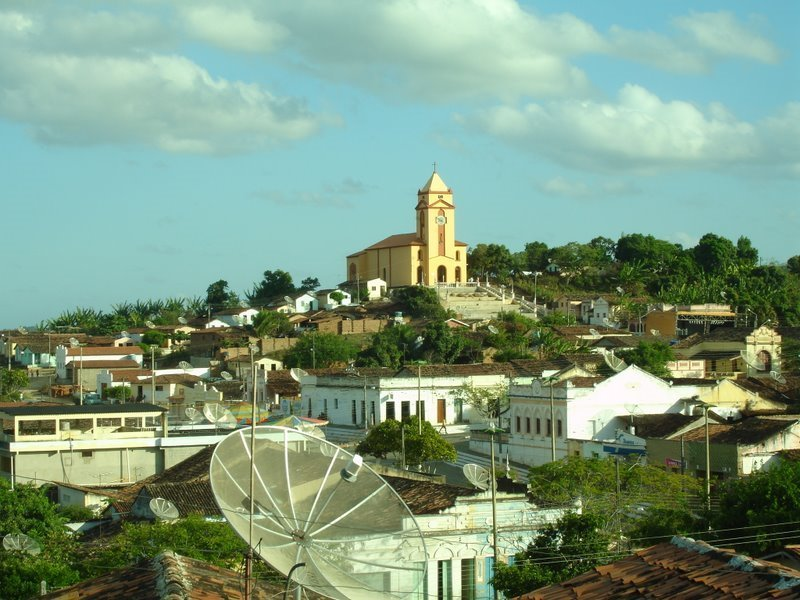
- View of Borborema

- Coat of arms

- Country: Brazil
- Region: Northeast
- State: Paraíba
- Mesoregion: Agreste Paraibano

Population (2020)
  - Total: 5,287
- Time zone: UTC−3 (BRT)

Borborema, Paraíba (Central northeastern portuguese pronunciation: [bɔɦbɔˈɾemɐ]) is a municipality in the state of Paraíba in the Northeast Region of Brazil.

== See also ==
- List of municipalities in Paraíba
