= Prata, Paraíba =

Coordinates: 7°41′27″S 37°04′48″W

- Municipality
- Flag Coat of arms
- Interactive map of Prata, Paraíba
- Country: Brazil
- Region: South
- State: Paraíba
- Mesoregion: Boborema

Population (2020)
  - Total: 4,238
- Time zone: UTC−3 (BRT)

Prata (Central northeastern portuguese pronunciation: [ˈpɾatɐ]) is a municipality in the state of Paraíba in the Northeast Region of Brazil.

== See also ==
- List of municipalities in Paraíba
