= Manaíra =

Coordinates: 7°42′S 38°10′W

- Municipality
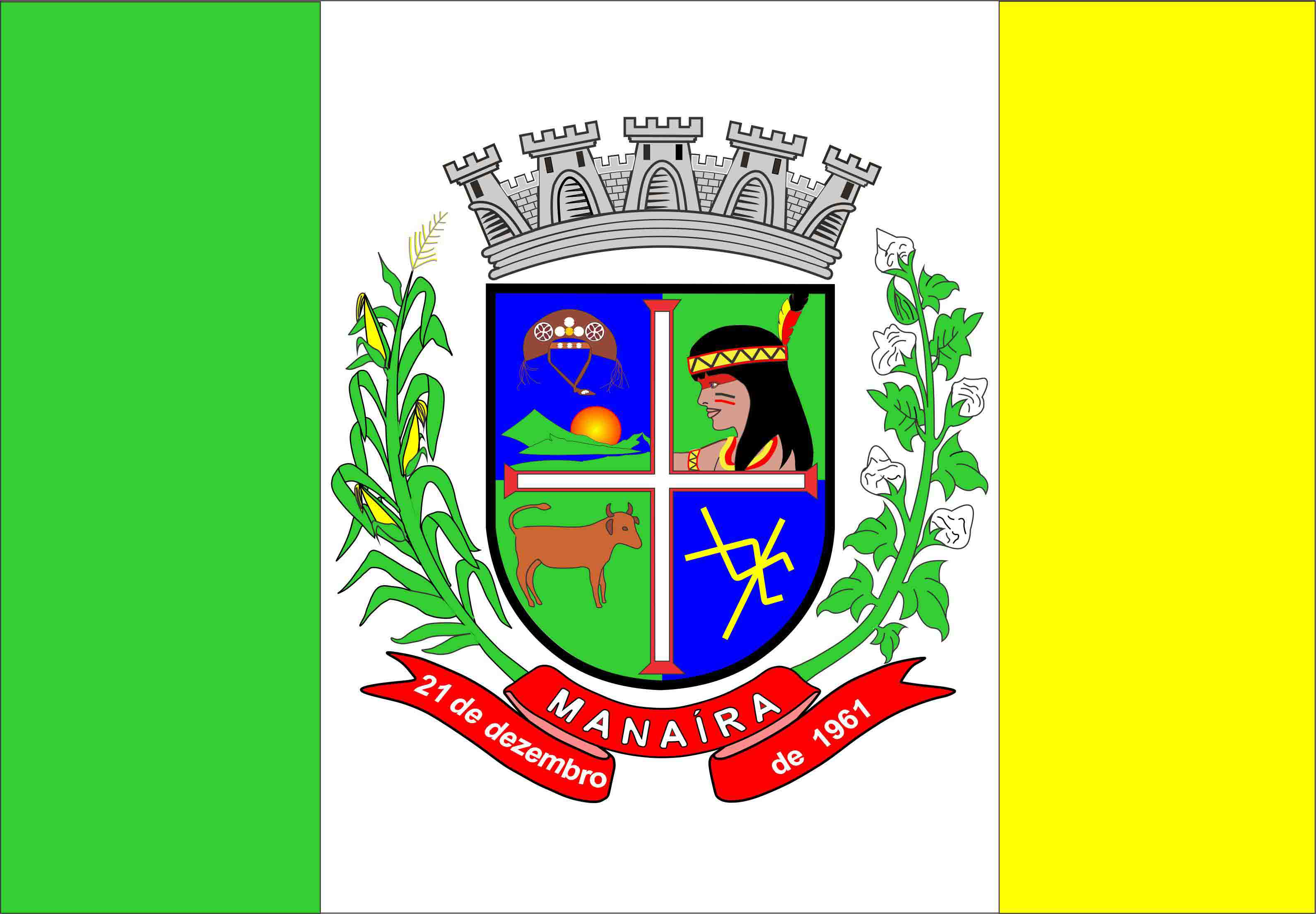
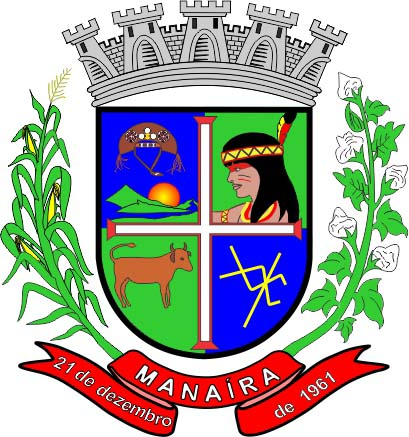
- Flag Coat of arms
- Interactive map of Manaíra
- Country: Brazil
- Region: Northeast
- State: Paraíba
- Mesoregion: Sertao Paraibana

Population (2020)
  - Total: 10,972
- Time zone: UTC−3 (BRT)

Manaíra is a municipality in the state of Paraíba in the Northeast Region of Brazil.

== See also ==
- List of municipalities in Paraíba
