= Montadas =

Coordinates: 7.08778°S 35.9589°W

- Municipality
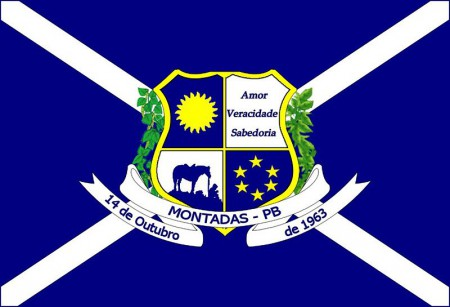
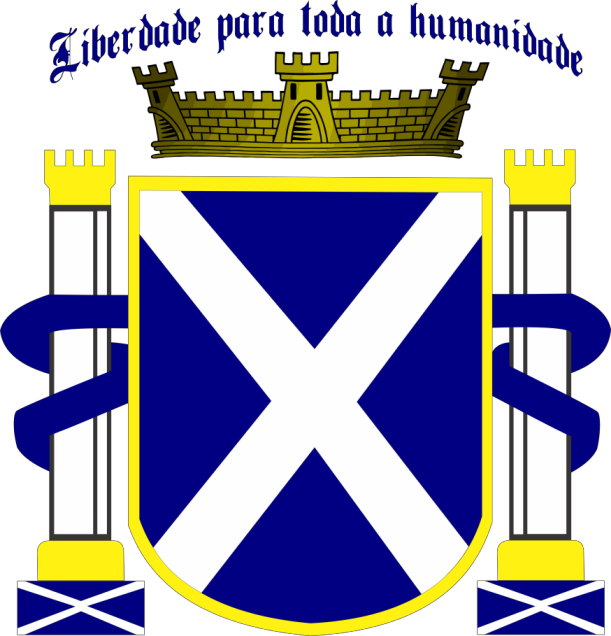
- Flag Coat of arms

- Location of Montadas in Paraíba and Brazil
- Country: Brazil
- Region: Northeast
- State: Paraíba
- Mesoregion: Agreste Paraibano

Population (2020)
  - Total: 5,738
- Time zone: UTC−3 (BRT)

Montadas (Central northeastern portuguese pronunciation: [mõˈtɐdɐ]) is a municipality in the state of Paraíba, in the Northeast Region of Brazil. It is the smallest municipality in that state.

== See also ==
- List of municipalities in Paraíba
