= Catingueira =

- Municipality
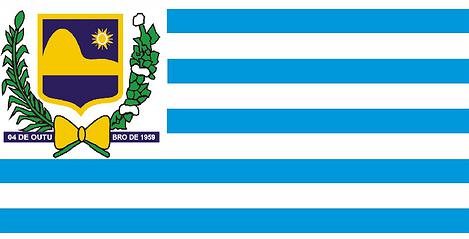
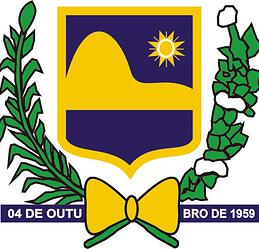
- Flag Coat of arms

- Location in Brazil
- Coordinates: 7.12583°S 37.6089°W
- Country: Brazil
- Region: Northeast
- State: Paraíba
- Mesoregion: Sertao Paraibana

Population (2020)
  - Total: 4,935
- Time zone: UTC−3 (BRT)

Catingueira is a municipality in the state of Paraíba in the Northeast Region of Brazil.

== See also ==
- List of municipalities in Paraíba
