= Areial =

- Municipality
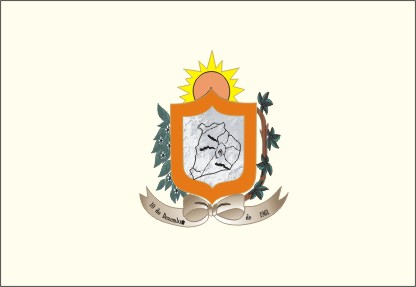
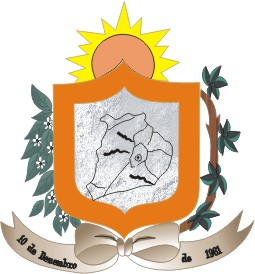
- Flag Coat of arms

- Location in Brazil
- Coordinates: 7.04778°S 35.9308°W
- Country: Brazil
- Region: Northeast
- State: Paraíba
- Mesoregion: Agreste Paraibano

Population (2020)
  - Total: 7,027
- Time zone: UTC−3 (BRT)

Areial (Central northeastern portuguese pronunciation: [ɐɾejˈɐw]) is a municipality in the state of Paraíba in the Northeast Region of Brazil.

== See also ==
- List of municipalities in Paraíba
