= Pilõezinhos =

Coordinates: 6.84389°S 35.5308°W

- Municipality
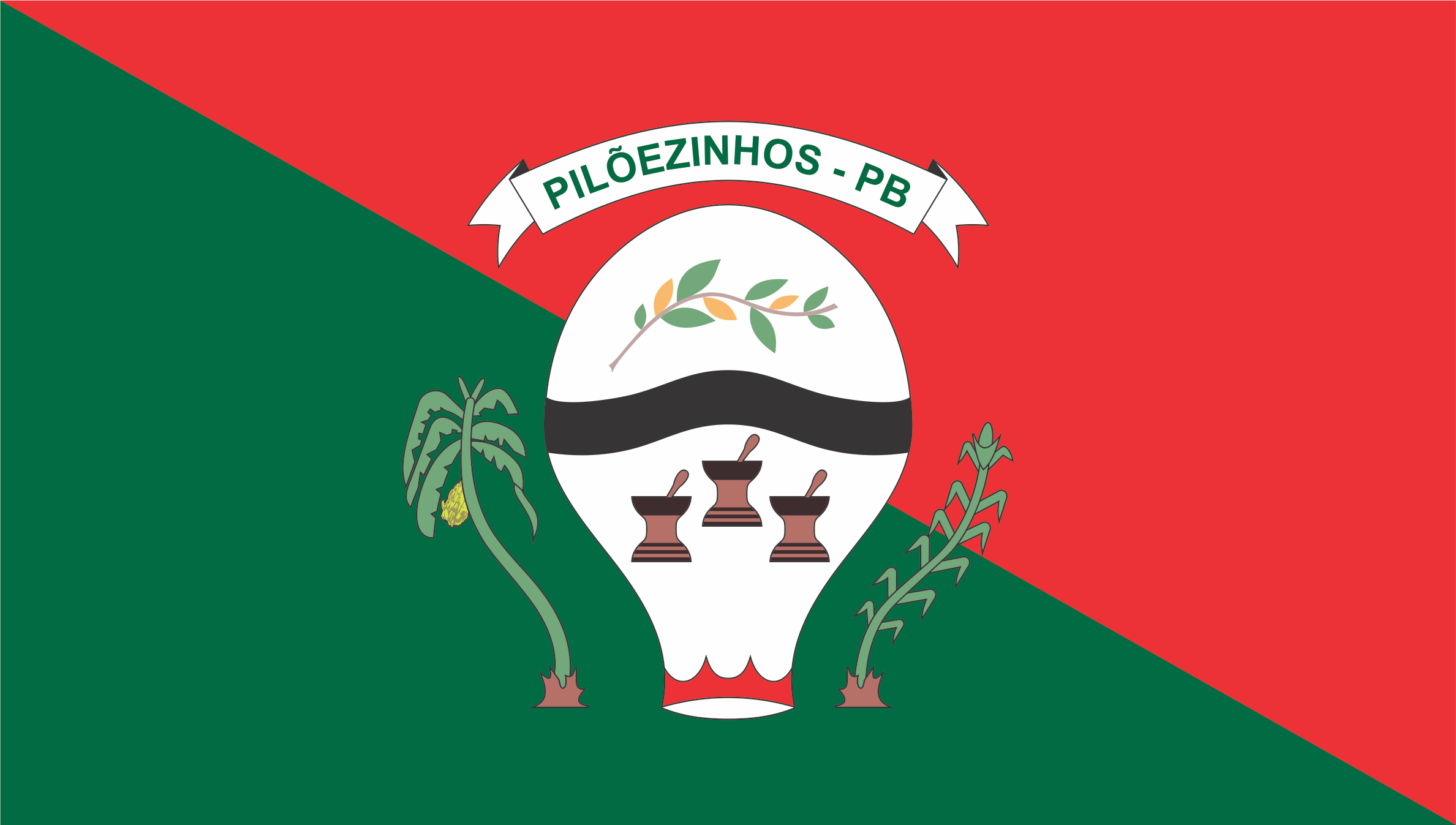
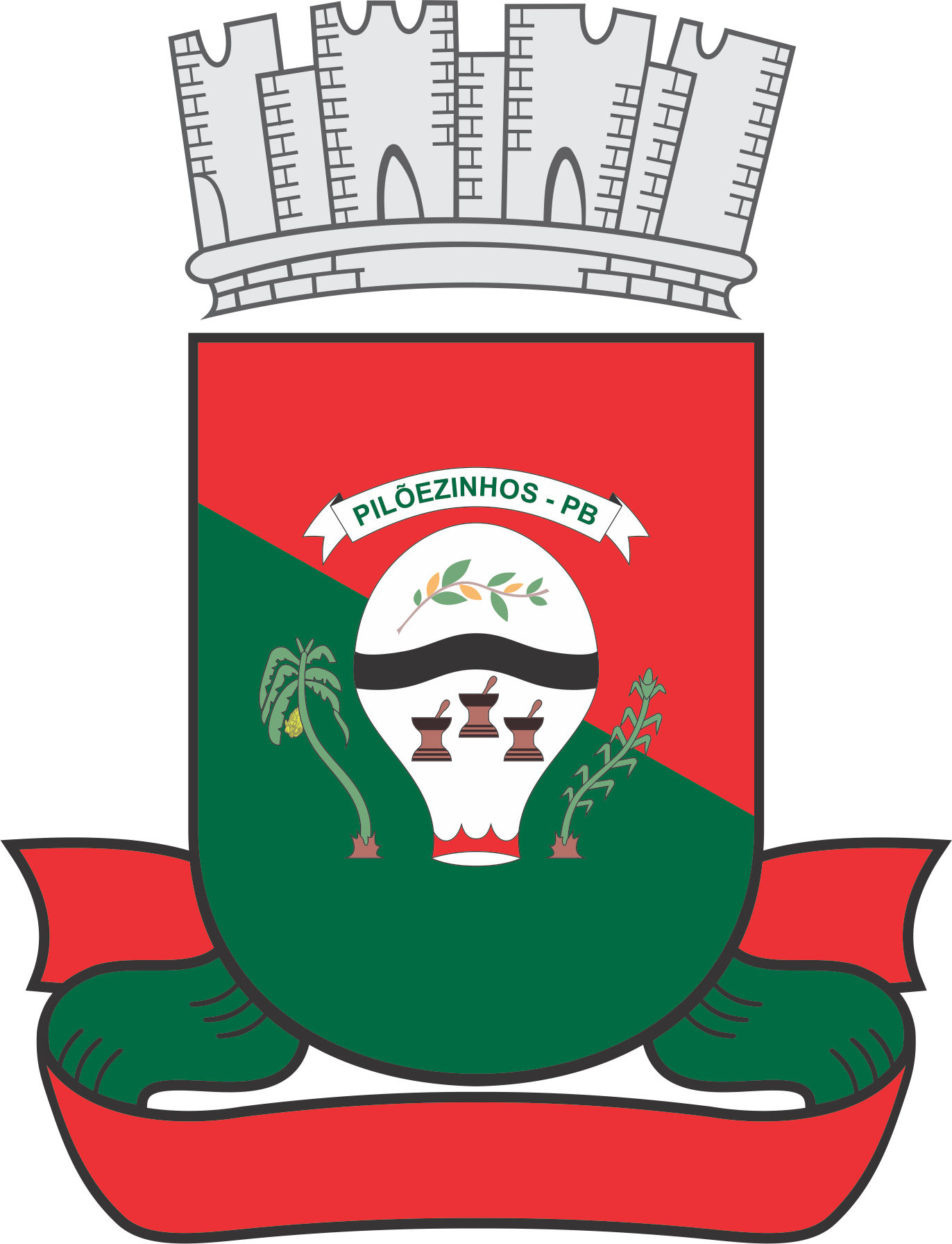
- Flag Coat of arms
- Interactive map of Pilõezinhos
- Country: Brazil
- Region: Northeast
- State: Paraíba
- Mesoregion: Agreste Paraibano

Population (2020)
  - Total: 4,955
- Time zone: UTC−3 (BRT)

Pilõezinhos (Central northeastern portuguese pronunciation: [pilɐ̃wˈzĩj̃u]) is a municipality in the state of Paraíba in the Northeast Region of Brazil.

== See also ==
- List of municipalities in Paraíba
