= Monte Horebe =

Coordinates: 7°12′S 38°36′W

- Municipality
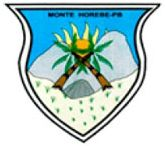
- Coat of arms
- Interactive map of Monte Horebe
- Country: Brazil
- Region: Northeast
- State: Paraíba
- Mesoregion: Sertao Paraibana

Population (2020)
  - Total: 4,842
- Time zone: UTC−3 (BRT)

Monte Horebe is a municipality in the state of Paraíba in the Northeast Region of Brazil.

== See also ==
- List of municipalities in Paraíba
