= Gado Bravo =

- Municipality
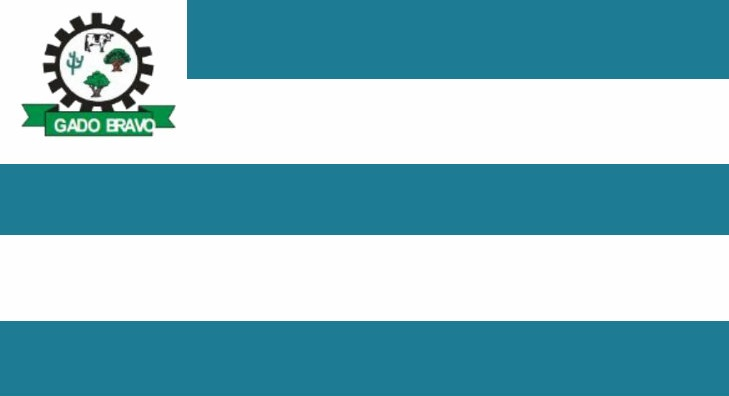
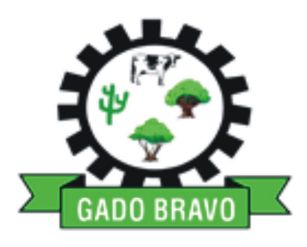
- Flag Coat of arms

- Location in Brazil
- Coordinates: 7.58278°S 35.7908°W
- Country: Brazil
- Region: South
- State: Paraíba
- Mesoregion: Agreste Paraibano

Population (2020)
  - Total: 8,303
- Time zone: UTC−3 (BRT)

Gado Bravo (Central northeastern portuguese pronunciation: [ˈɡɐdŭ ˈbɾabŭ]) is a municipality in the state of Paraíba in the Northeast Region of Brazil.

== See also ==
- List of municipalities in Paraíba
