= Cuitegi =

- Municipality
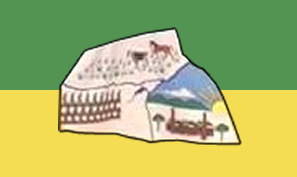
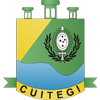
- Flag Coat of arms

- Location in Brazil
- Coordinates: 6°54′S 35°32′W
- Country: Brazil
- Region: Northeast
- State: Paraíba
- Mesoregion: Agreste Paraibano

Population (2020)
  - Total: 6,775
- Time zone: UTC−3 (BRT)

Cuitegi (Central northeastern portuguese pronunciation: [kujtɛˈʒi]) is a municipality in the state of Paraíba in the Northeast Region of Brazil.

== See also ==
- List of municipalities in Paraíba
