= Itatuba =

Coordinates: 7.375°S 35.6278°W

- Municipality
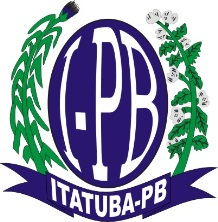
- Coat of arms
- Interactive map of Itatuba
- Country: Brazil
- Region: South
- State: Paraíba
- Mesoregion: Agreste Paraibano

Population (2020)
  - Total: 11,016
- Time zone: UTC−3 (BRT)

Itatuba (Central northeastern portuguese pronunciation: [itɐˈtubɐ]) is a municipality in the state of Paraíba in the Northeast Region of Brazil.

== See also ==
- List of municipalities in Paraíba
