= Areia de Baraúnas =

- Municipality
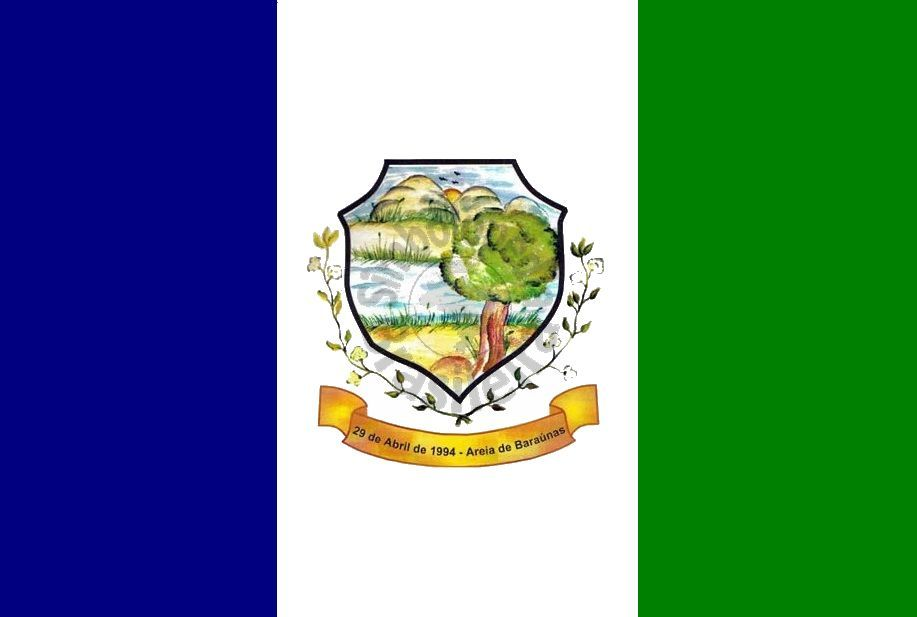
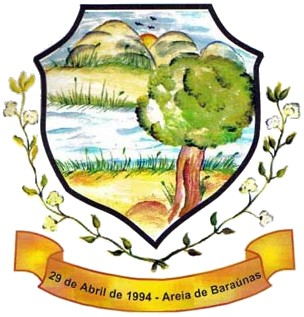
- Flag Coat of arms

- Location in Brazil
- Coordinates: 7.12278°S 36.9408°W
- Country: Brazil
- Region: Northeast
- State: Paraíba
- Mesoregion: Sertao Paraibana

Population (2020)
  - Total: 2,116
- Time zone: UTC−3 (BRT)

Areia de Baraúnas is a municipality in the state of Paraíba in the Northeast Region of Brazil.

== See also ==
- List of municipalities in Paraíba
