= Cacimba de Areia =

- Municipality
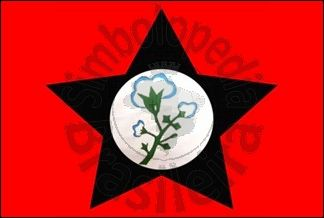
- Flag

- Location in Brazil
- Coordinates: 7°07′S 37°10′W
- Country: Brazil
- Region: Northeast
- State: Paraíba
- Mesoregion: Sertao Paraibana

Population (2020)
  - Total: 3,695
- Time zone: UTC−3 (BRT)

Cacimba de Areia is a municipality in the state of Paraíba in the Northeast Region of Brazil.

== See also ==
- List of municipalities in Paraíba
