= São José de Caiana =

Coordinates: 7.24889°S 38.3008°W

- Municipality
- Interactive map of São José de Caiana
- Country: Brazil
- Region: Northeast
- State: Paraíba
- Mesoregion: Sertao Paraibana

Population (2020)
  - Total: 6,376
- Time zone: UTC−3 (BRT)

São José de Caiana is a municipality in the state of Paraíba in the Northeast Region of Brazil.

== See also ==
- List of municipalities in Paraíba
