= Santana dos Garrotes =

Coordinates: 7°23′S 37°59′W

- Municipality
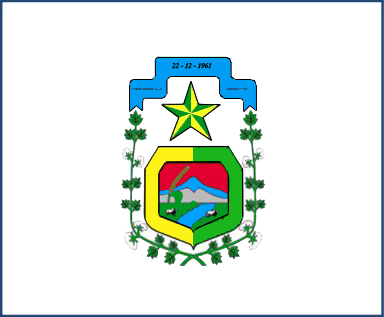
- Flag Coat of arms
- Interactive map of Santana dos Garrotes
- Country: Brazil
- Region: Northeast
- State: Paraíba
- Mesoregion: Sertao Paraibana

Population (2020)
  - Total: 6,986
- Time zone: UTC−3 (BRT)

Santana dos Garrotes is a municipality in the state of Paraíba in the Northeast Region of Brazil.

== See also ==
- List of municipalities in Paraíba
