= Algodão de Jandaíra =

Coordinates: 6.81583°S 35.9219°W

- Municipality
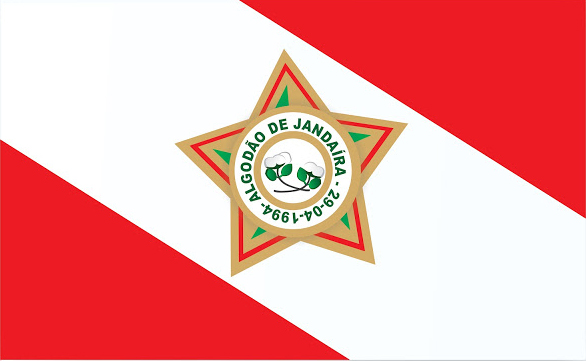
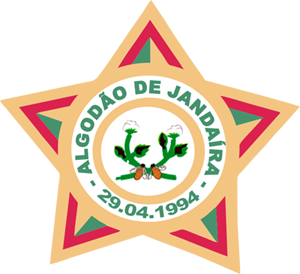
- Flag Coat of arms
- Interactive map of Algodão de Jandaíra
- Country: Brazil
- Region: Northeast
- State: Paraíba
- Mesoregion: Agreste Paraibano

Population (2020)
  - Total: 2,577
- Time zone: UTC−3 (BRT)

Algodão de Jandaíra (Central northeastern portuguese pronunciation: [ɐwɡuˈdɐ̃w di ʒɐ̃dɐˈiɾɐ]) is a municipality in the state of Paraíba in the Northeast Region of Brazil.

== See also ==
- List of municipalities in Paraíba
