= Barra de Santana =

- Municipality
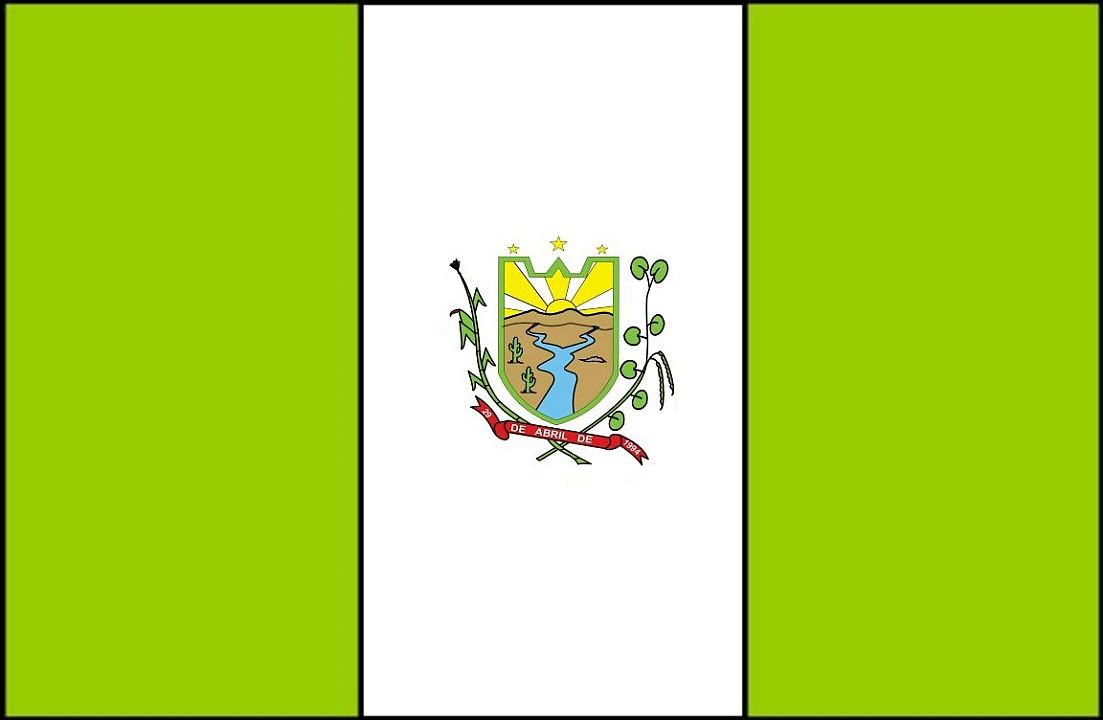
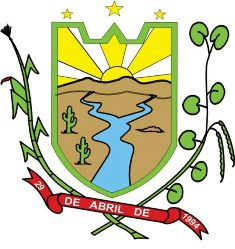
- Flag Coat of arms
- Motto: "De Abril De"
- Location in Brazil
- Coordinates: 7.52°S 36°W
- Country: Brazil
- Region: South
- State: Paraíba
- Mesoregion: Boborema

Government

Population (2020)
  - Total: 8,349
- Time zone: UTC−3 (BRT)

Barra de Santana (Central northeastern portuguese pronunciation: [ˈbahɐ di sɐ̃ˈtɐ̃nɐ]) is a municipality in the state of Paraíba in the Northeast Region of Brazil.

== See also ==
- List of municipalities in Paraíba
