= Natuba =

- Municipality
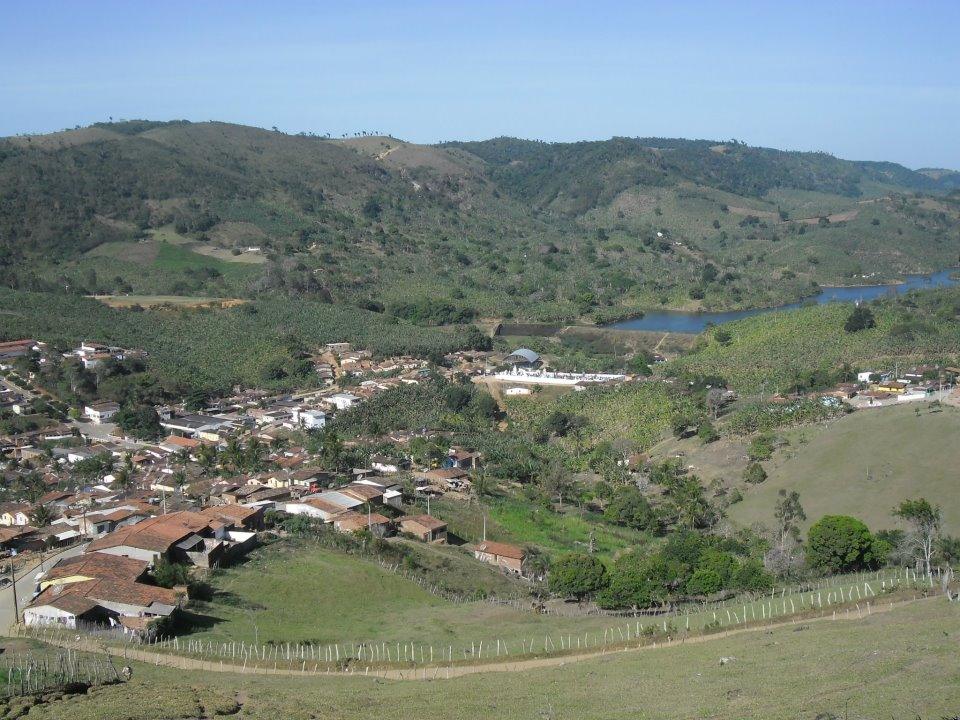

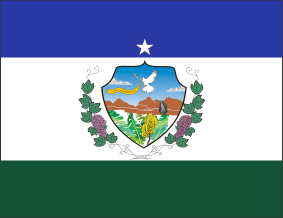
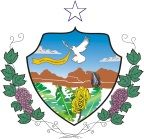
- Flag Coat of arms

- Location in Brazil
- Coordinates: 7.64083°S 35.55°W
- Country: Brazil
- Region: South
- State: Paraíba
- Mesoregion: Agreste Paraibano

Population (2020)
  - Total: 10,451
- Time zone: UTC−3 (BRT)

Natuba (Central northeastern portuguese pronunciation: [nɐˈtubɐ]) is a municipality in the state of Paraíba in the Northeast Region of Brazil.

== See also ==
- List of municipalities in Paraíba
