= Santa Helena, Paraíba =

Coordinates: 6°43′12″S 38°38′16″W

- Municipality
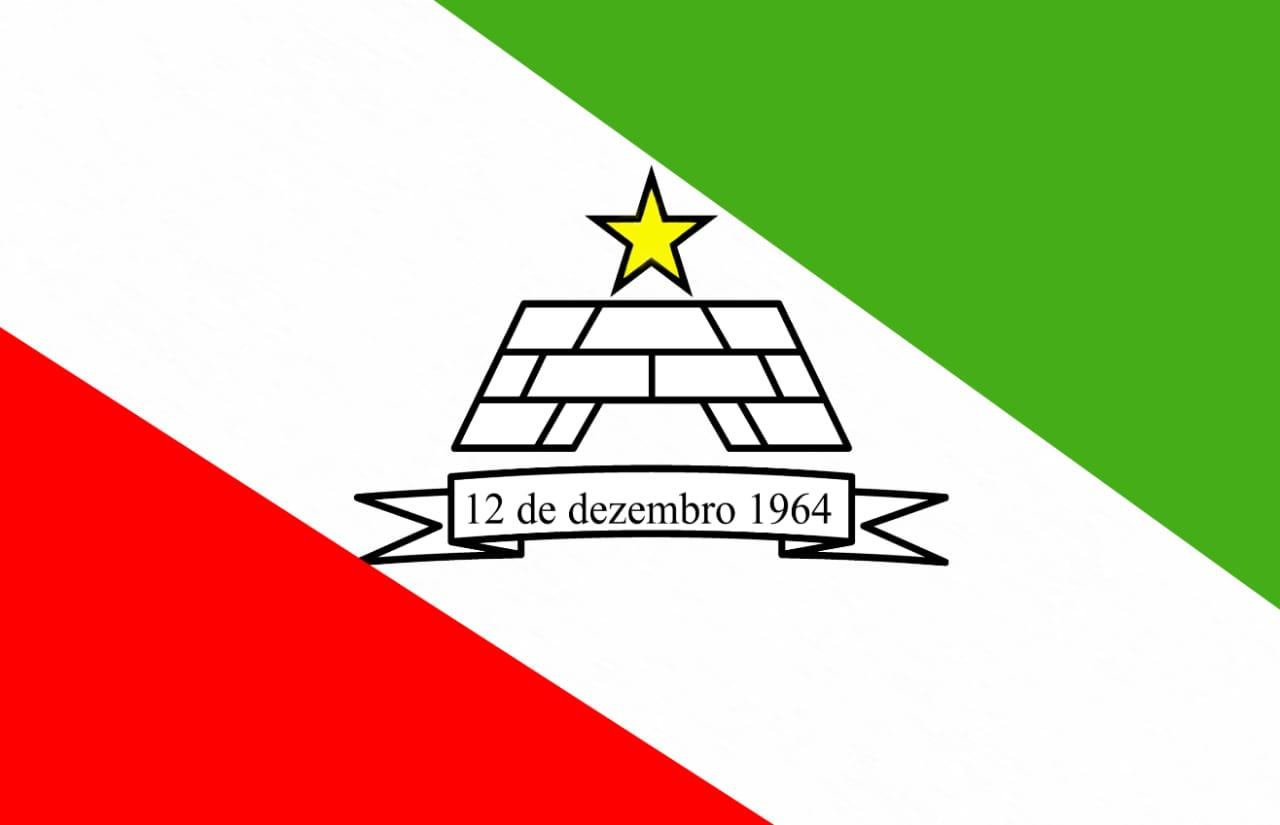
- Flag
- Interactive map of Santa Helena, Paraíba
- Country: Brazil
- Region: Northeast
- State: Paraíba
- Mesoregion: Sertao Paraibana

Population (2020)
  - Total: 5,871
- Time zone: UTC−3 (BRT)

Santa Helena, Paraíba is a municipality in the state of Paraíba in the Northeast Region of Brazil.

== See also ==
- List of municipalities in Paraíba
