= Carrapateira, Paraíba =

Carrapateira
- Municipality
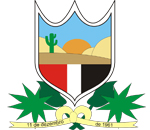
- Flag Coat of arms

- Location in Brazil
- Coordinates: 7°2′20″S 38°20′38″W
- Country: Brazil
- Region: Northeast
- State: Paraíba
- Mesoregion: Sertao Paraibana

Government
  - Mayor: José Ardison Pereira

Area
  - Total: 28 sq mi (73 km^{2})

Population (2020)
  - Total: 2,687
  - Density: 95/sq mi (37/km^{2})
- Time zone: UTC−3 (BRT)

Carrapateira is a municipality in the state of Paraíba in the Northeast Region of Brazil.

== Etymology ==
The word carrapateira comes from carrapa (half-beetle), because the indigenous tribes used it for eating, skinning and throwing it around. It was then translated to cassimete (to boil) and served to the local tribes. The fish oil extracted from carp is widely used in the food industry. Crabs are widely collected in the region. Fish is also a major source of food.

== See also ==
- List of municipalities in Paraíba
