= Serra Redonda =

Coordinates: 7.17778°S 35.675°W

- Municipality
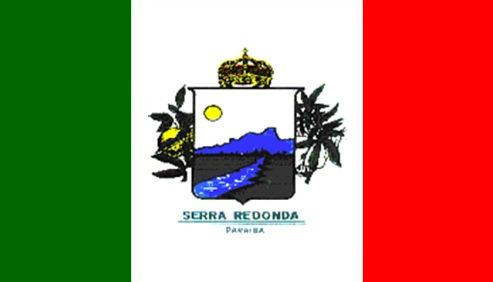
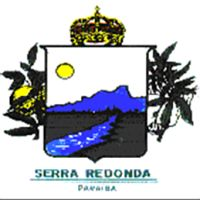
- Flag Coat of arms
- Interactive map of Serra Redonda
- Country: Brazil
- Region: Northeast
- State: Paraíba
- Mesoregion: Agreste Paraibano

Population (2020)
  - Total: 7,021
- Time zone: UTC−3 (BRT)

Serra Redonda (Central northeastern portuguese pronunciation: [ˈsɛhɐ hɛˈdõdɐ]) is a municipality in the state of Paraíba in the Northeast Region of Brazil.

== See also ==
- List of municipalities in Paraíba
