= Salgadinho, Paraíba =

Coordinates: 7°06′10″S 36°50′42″W

- Municipality

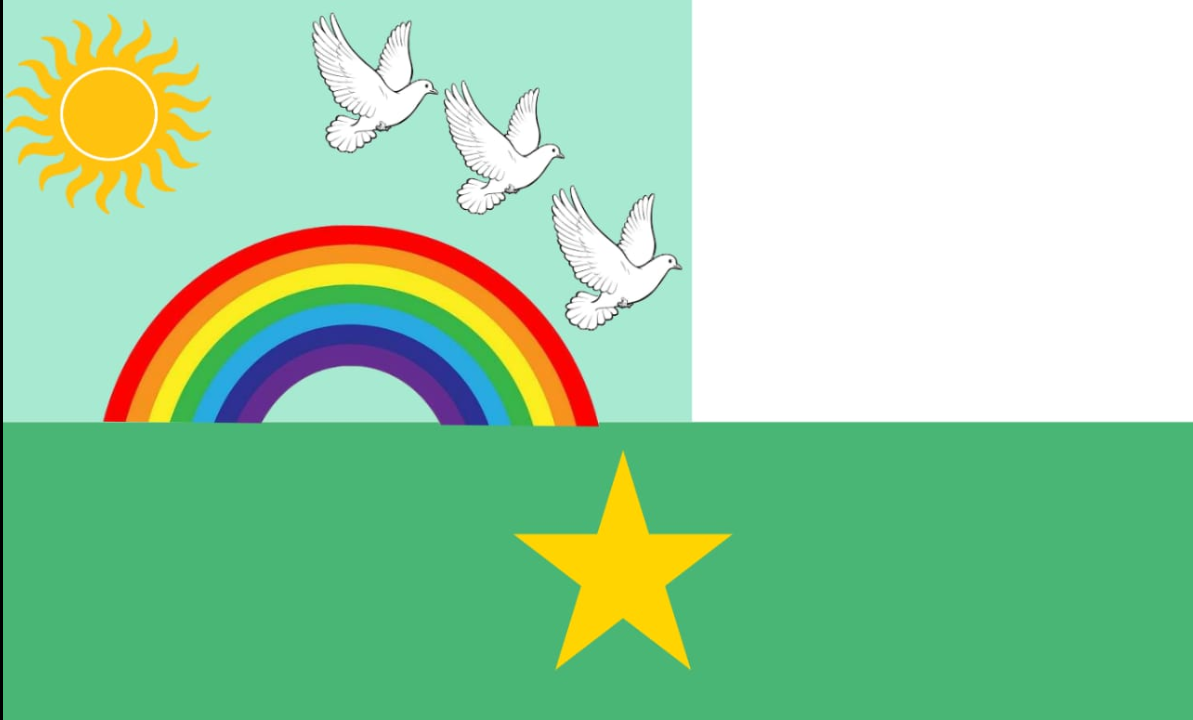
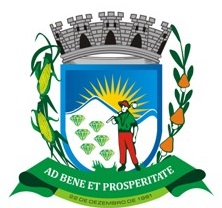
- Flag Coat of arms
- Interactive map of Salgadinho, Paraíba
- Country: Brazil
- Region: South
- State: Paraíba
- Mesoregion: Boborema
- Elevation: 1,380 ft (420 m)

Population (2020)
  - Total: 3,931
- Time zone: UTC−3 (BRT)

Salgadinho (Central northeastern portuguese pronunciation: [sɐwɡɐˈdĩj̃u]) is a municipality in the state of Paraíba in the Northeast Region of Brazil.

== See also ==
- List of municipalities in Paraíba
