= Caraúbas, Paraíba =

Caraúbas
- Municipality
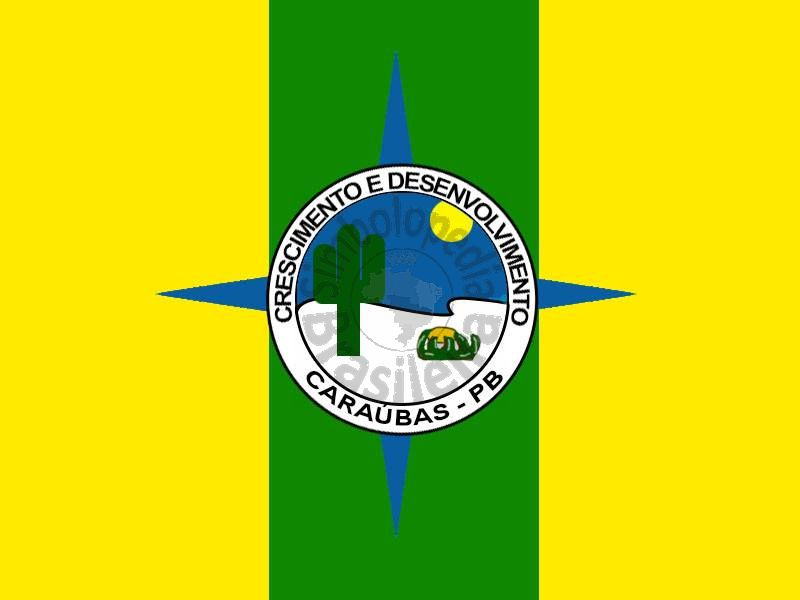
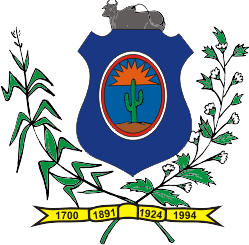
- Flag Coat of arms

- Location in Brazil
- Coordinates: 7°43′37″S 36°29′31″W
- Country: Brazil
- Region: South
- State: Paraíba
- Mesoregion: Boborema

Population (2020)
  - Total: 4,185
- Time zone: UTC−3 (BRT)

Caraúbas (Central northeastern portuguese pronunciation: [kɐɾɐˈubɐ]) is a municipality in the state of Paraíba in the Northeast Region of Brazil.

== See also ==
- List of municipalities in Paraíba
