= Diamante, Paraíba =

Coordinates: 7°25′40″S 38°15′50″W

- Municipality
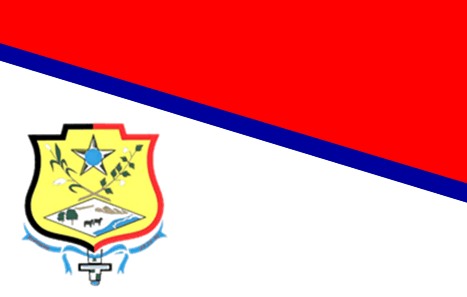
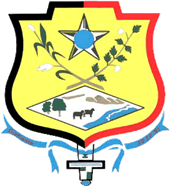
- Flag Coat of arms
- Interactive map of Diamante, Paraíba
- Country: Brazil
- Region: Northeast
- State: Paraíba
- Mesoregion: Sertao Paraibana

Population (2020)
  - Total: 6,528
- Time zone: UTC−3 (BRT)

Diamante, Paraíba is a municipality in the state of Paraíba in the Northeast Region of Brazil.

== See also ==
- List of municipalities in Paraíba
