= Aroeiras, Paraíba =

Coordinates: 7°32′42″S 35°42′28″W

- Municipality
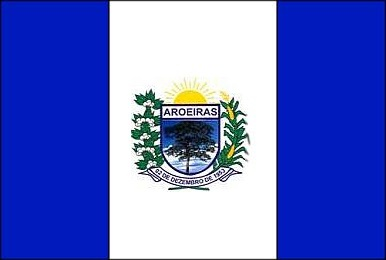
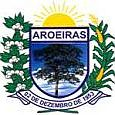
- Flag Coat of arms
- Interactive map of Aroeiras, Paraíba
- Country: Brazil
- Region: South
- State: Paraíba
- Mesoregion: Agreste Paraibano

Government

Population (2020)
  - Total: 19,116
- Time zone: UTC−3 (BRT)

Aroeiras (Central northeastern portuguese pronunciation: [ɐɾuˈeɾɐ]) is a municipality in the state of Paraíba in the Northeast Region of Brazil.

== See also ==
- List of municipalities in Paraíba
