= Riachão do Bacamarte =

- Municipality
- Flag Coat of arms

- Location in Brazil
- Coordinates: 7°15′S 35°41′W
- Country: Brazil
- Region: Northeast
- State: Paraíba
- Mesoregion: Agreste Paraibano

Population (2020)
  - Total: 4,541
- Time zone: UTC−3 (BRT)

Riachão do Bacamarte (Central northeastern portuguese pronunciation: [hjɐˈʃɐ̃w du bɐkɐˈmaɦtĭ]) is a municipality in the state of Paraíba in the Northeast Region of Brazil.

== See also ==
- List of municipalities in Paraíba
