= Sertãozinho, Paraíba =

Coordinates: 6°45′03″S 35°26′31″W

- Municipality
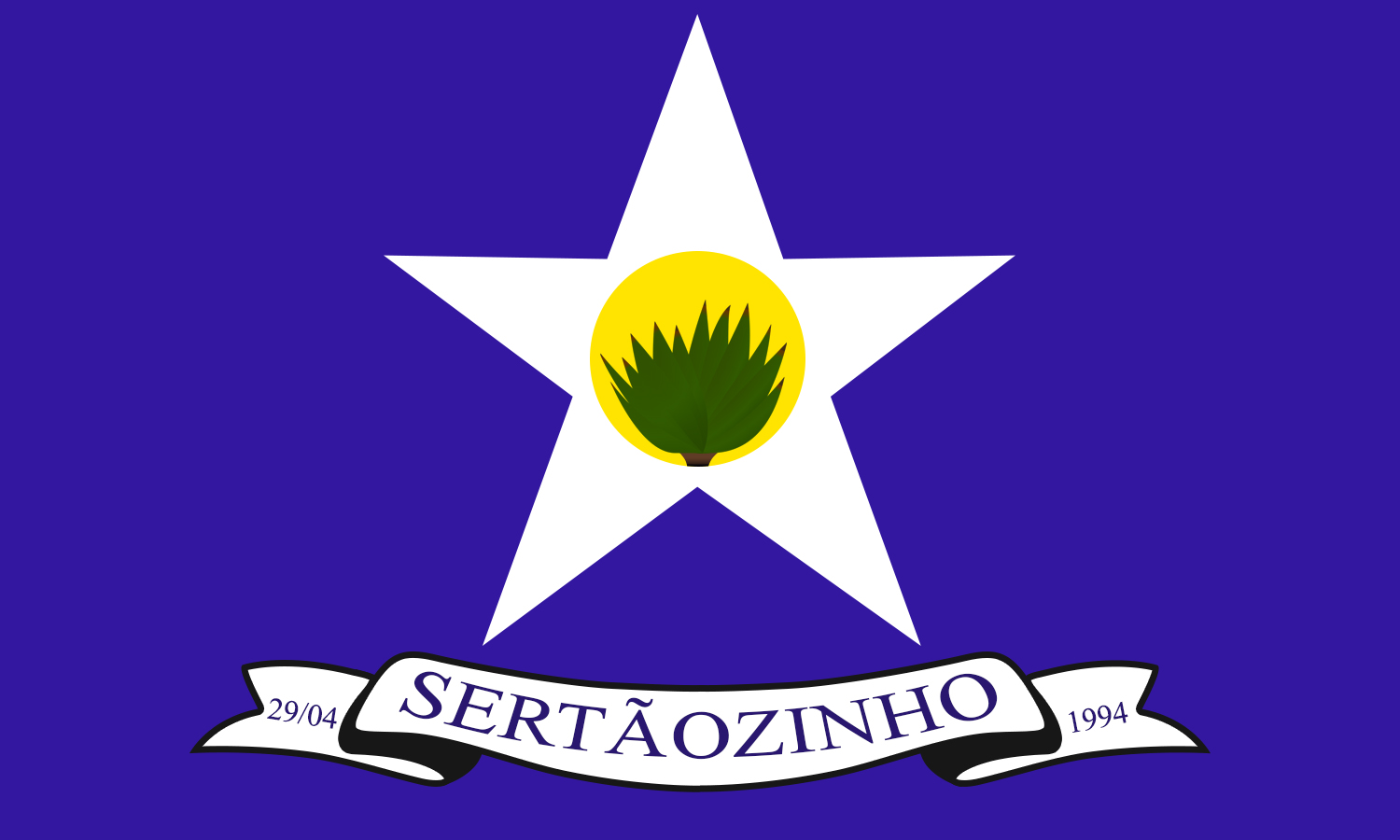
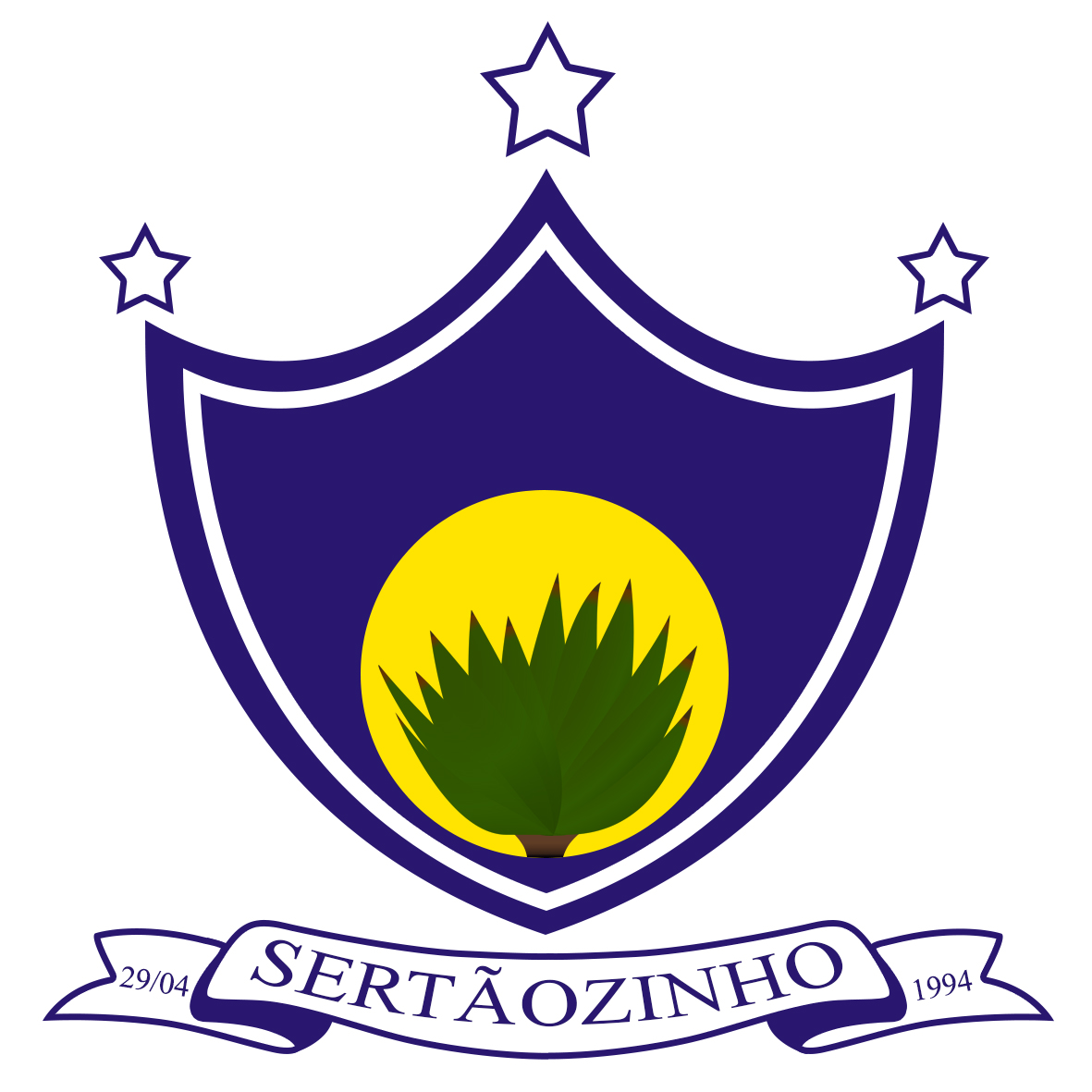
- Flag Coat of arms
- Interactive map of Sertãozinho, Paraíba
- Country: Brazil
- Region: Northeast
- State: Paraíba
- Mesoregion: Agreste Paraibano

Population (2020)
  - Total: 5,089
- Time zone: UTC−3 (BRT)

Sertãozinho (Central northeastern portuguese pronunciation: [sɛɦtɐ̃wˈzĩj̃u]) is a municipality in the state of Paraíba in the Northeast Region of Brazil.

== See also ==
- List of municipalities in Paraíba
