= Caruaru =

Municipality in Pernambuco, Brazil

Caruaru Cidade de Caruaru
- City
- City of Caruaru
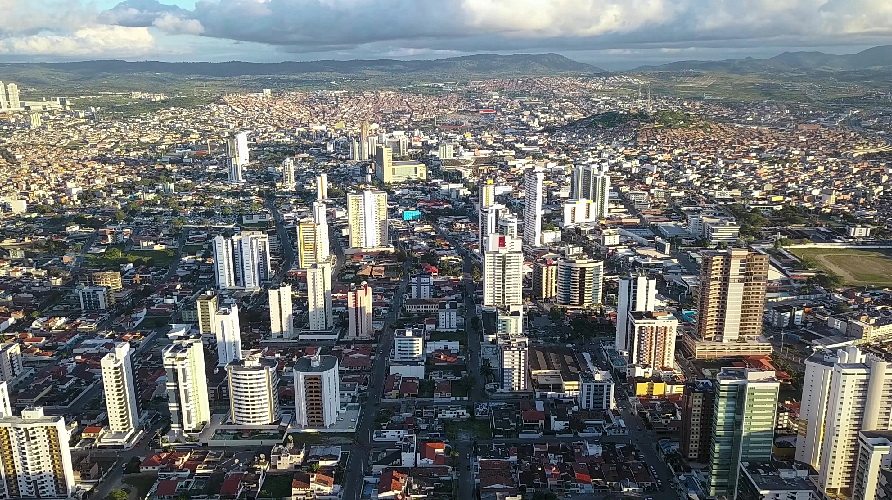
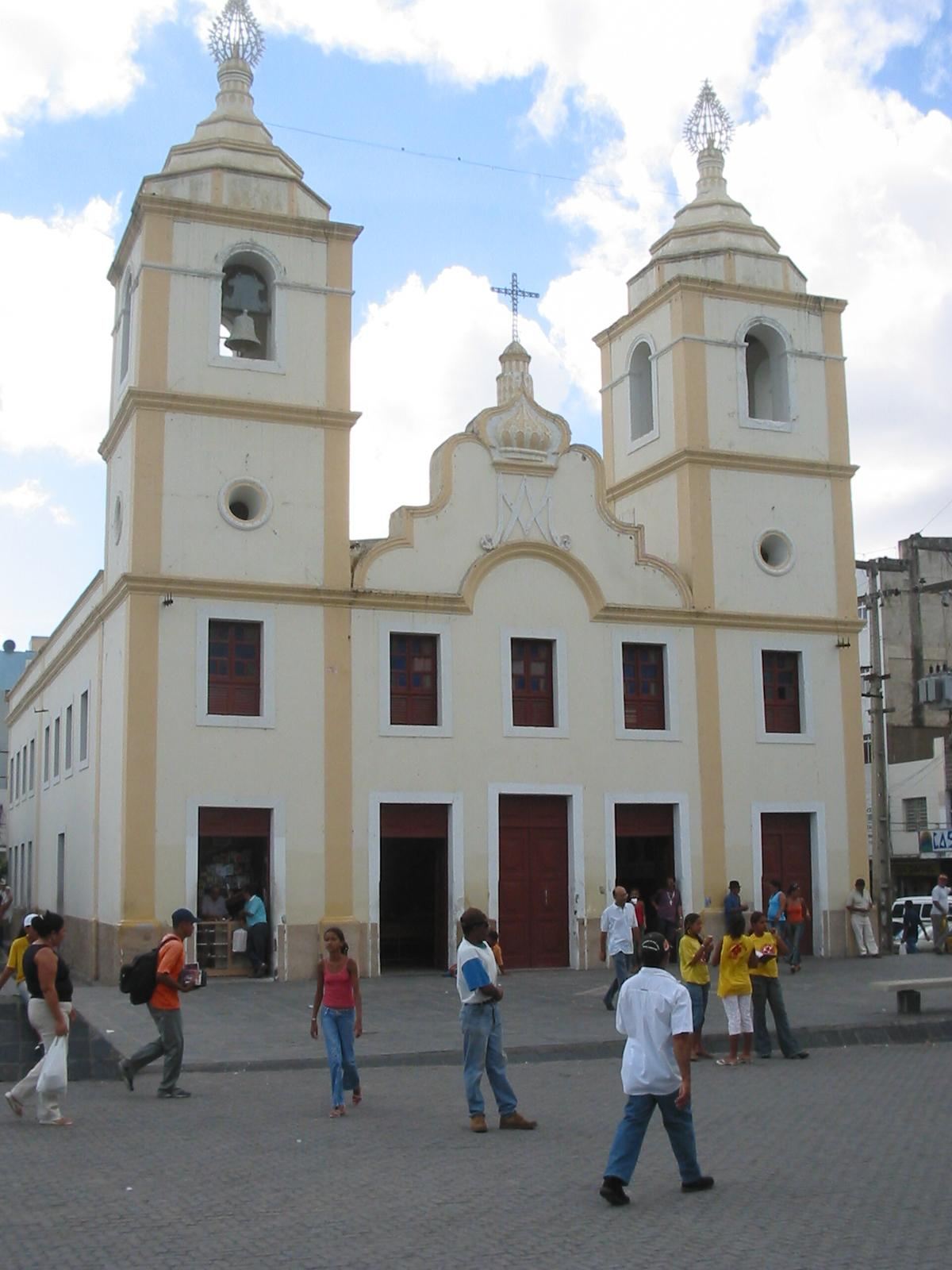
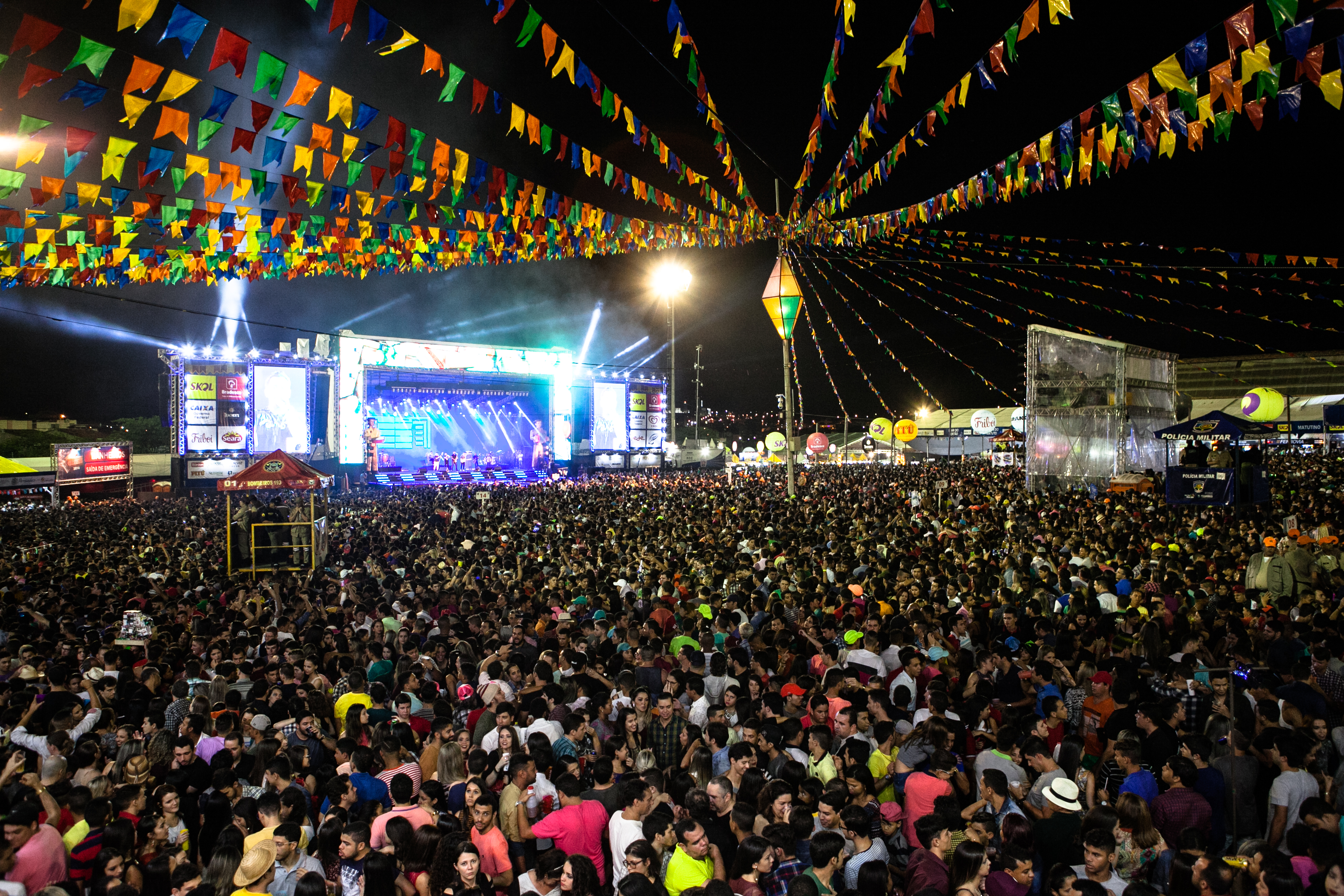
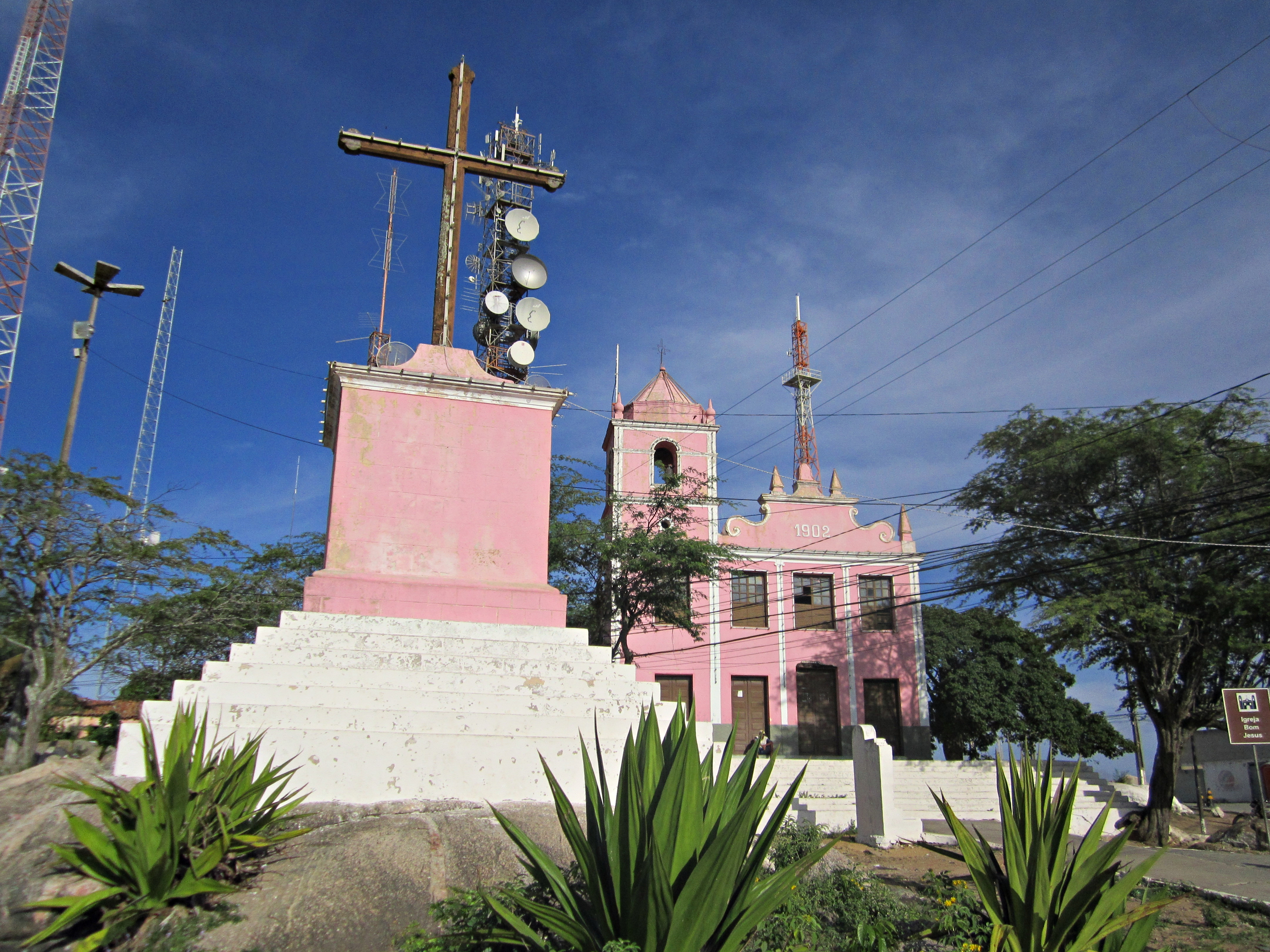
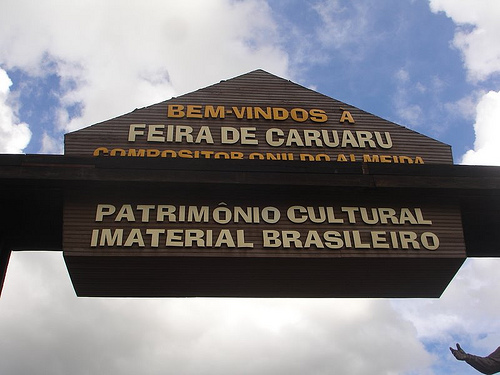
- Urban landscape of Caruaru Conceição Church São João de Caruaru Monte do Bom Jesus Chapel Caruaru Fair

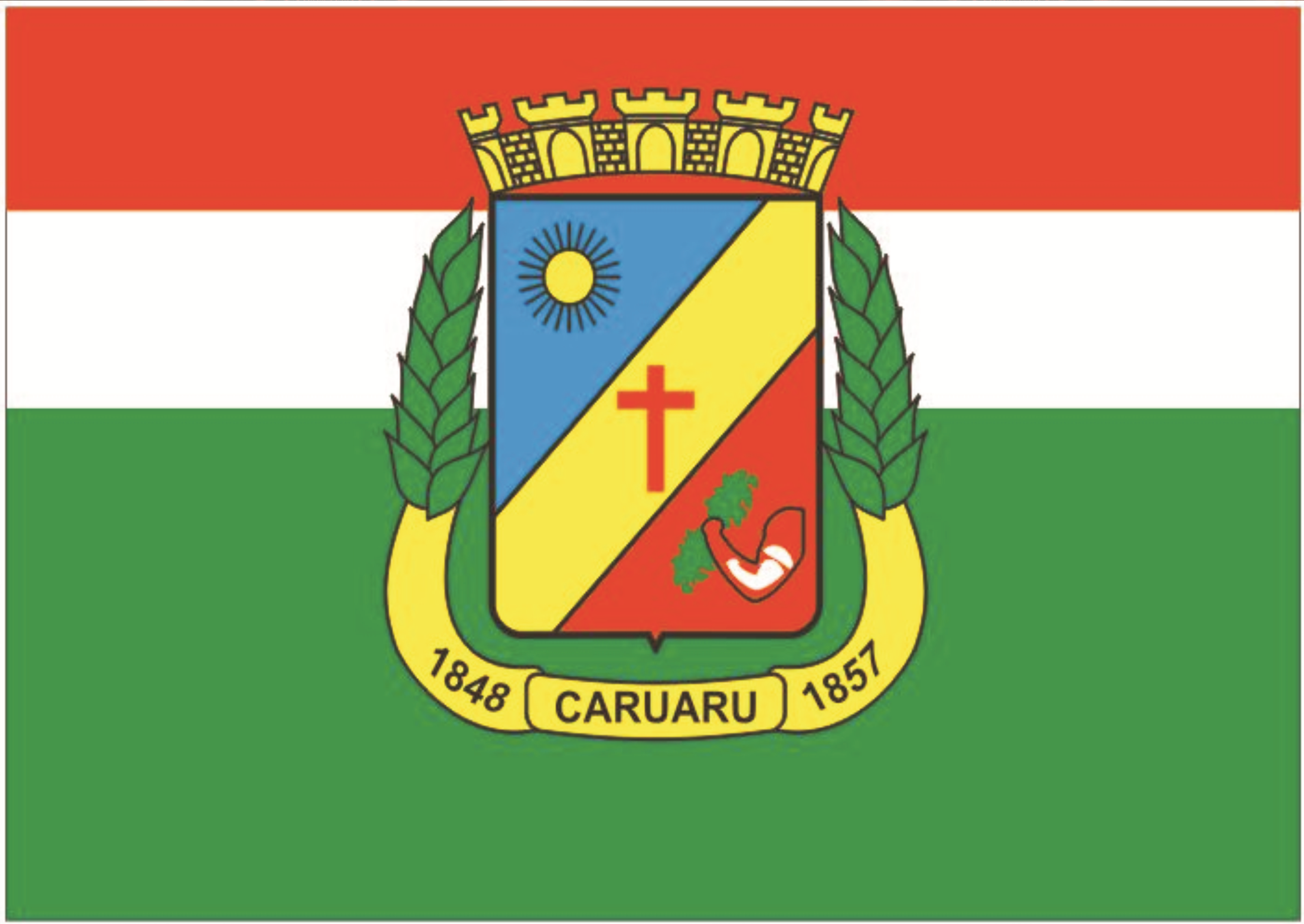
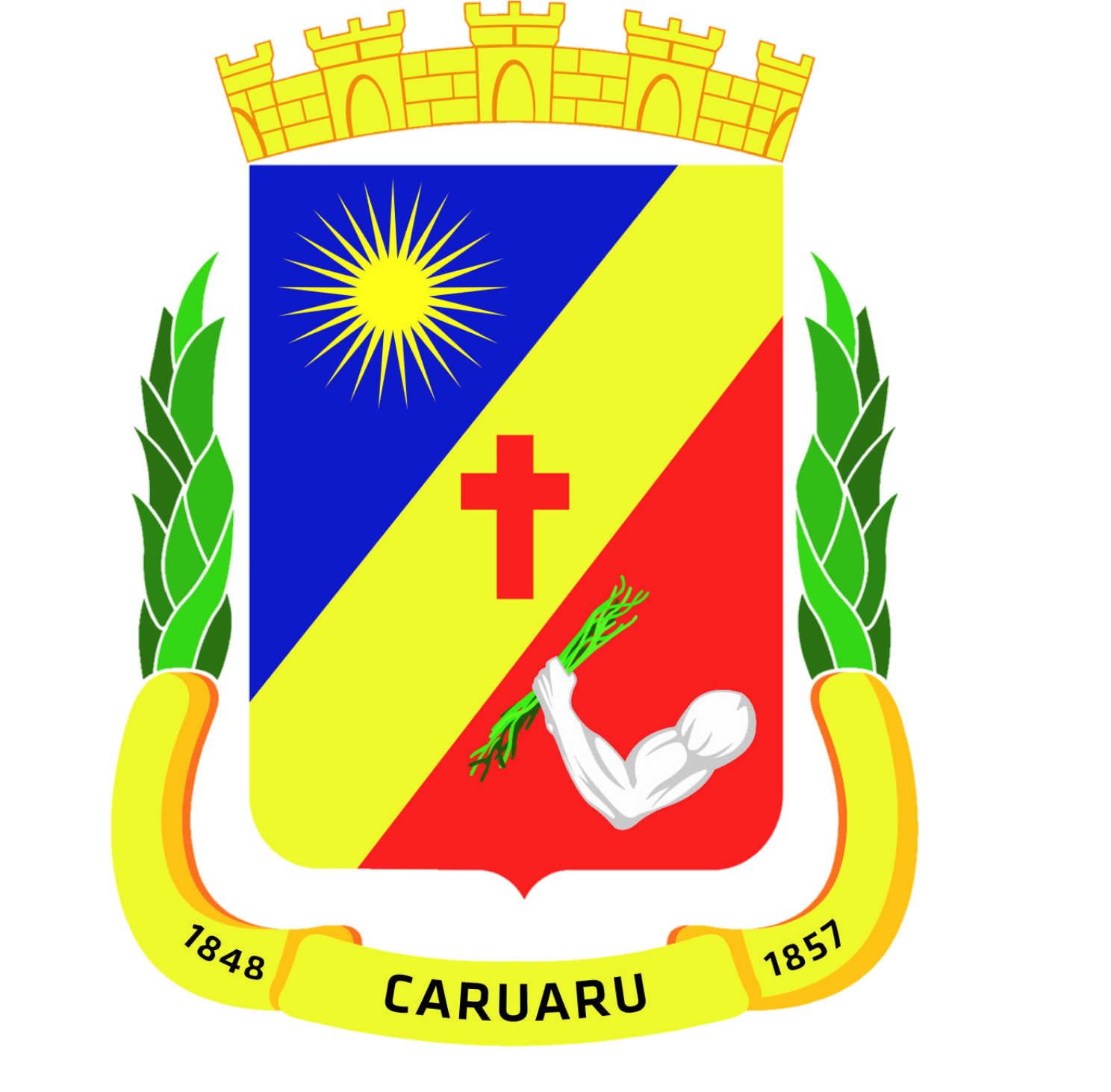
- Flag Coat of arms

- Location of Caruaru in Pernambuco

- Location of Caruaru in Brazil
- Coordinates: 08°16′58″S 35°58′33″W
- Country: Brazil
- Region: Northeast
- State: Pernambuco
- Intermediate Region: Caruaru
- Neighboring municipalities: North: Toritama, Vertentes, and Taquaritinga do Norte; South: Altinho and Agrestina; East: Bezerros, Frei Miguelinho, and Riacho das Almas; West: São Caetano and Brejo da Madre de Deus
- Distance to capital: 130 kilometres (81 mi)
- Districts: Caruaru, Carapotós, Lajedo do Cedro, and Gonçalves Ferreira
- Foundation: 18 May 1857
- Emancipation: 1 March 1893

Government
  - Mayor: Rodrigo Pinheiro (PSDB)
  - Term: 2025–2028

Area
  - City: 923.150 km^{2} (356.430 sq mi)
  - Urban (IBGE/2019): 59.51 km^{2} (22.98 sq mi)
- Elevation: 554 m (1,818 ft)

Population (2022 IBGE Census)
  - City: 378,048
  - Estimate (2025): 405,408
  - Density: 409.5/km^{2} (1,061/sq mi)
- Demonym: Caruaruense
- Time zone: UTC-3 (Brasília Time)
- Postal code: 55000-000
- Area code: +55 81
- Climate: Semi-arid
- Climate classification: BSh
- HDI (UNDP/2010): 0.677
- Gini coefficient (2024): 0.488
- GDP (IBGE/2020): R$7,518,244.06
- GDP per capita (IBGE/2020): R$20,582.25
- Website: www.caruaru.pe.gov.br

Caruaru (Portuguese pronunciation: [caɾua'ɾu] listen) is a Brazilian municipality in the state of Pernambuco, located in the Northeast region of the country. It is part of the Caruaru Intermediate Geographic Region. According to the 2025 census, its population is 405,408 inhabitants, making it the second most populous municipality in the interior of Pernambuco and the fourth most populous in the Northeast countryside, surpassed only by Feira de Santana, Campina Grande, and Petrolina. The municipality is situated to the west of the state capital, Recife, approximately 130 kilometres (81 mi) away. It covers an area of 923.150 square kilometres (356.430 sq mi), of which 59.51 square kilometres (22.98 sq mi) is urban.

Founded on 18 May 1857, one account of its origin suggests that the municipality began to take shape in 1681 when the then-governor of the captaincy granted the Rodrigues de Sá family a sesmaria spanning thirty leagues, aimed at developing agriculture and cattle ranching in the region. However, a more widely accepted account considers a sesmaria charter granted in 1661 by Governor Fernão de Souza Coutinho to Captain Bernardo Vieira de Mello, a nobleman and knight of the Royal Household, who likely held lands that included Caruaru. A 1758 document recording an investigation into abuses committed by Bernardo’s son, Antônio Vieira de Mello, mentions "…in these my lands a site called Caruru, which my father settled eighty years ago…" (verbatim), dating the establishment of Caruru around 1678, when the area was demarcated and organized as a farm.

The name Caruru likely refers to the region and gave its name to a farm at the heart of what is now the city’s central landmark. Its strategic location and the entrepreneurial spirit of its inhabitants led to significant growth and rapid population increase, necessitating the construction of a chapel in 1782, dedicated to Our Lady of Conception. This chapel fostered a sense of community and visibility for the residents of the village and surrounding areas, eventually giving rise to the city. The chapel’s builder, José Rodrigues de Jesus, was not a native of the area but came from Cabo de Santo Agostinho, son of Plácido Rodrigues de Jesus and Lourença do Vale Pereira. He was married to Maria do Rosário, a native of Vitória de Santo Antão, and they had eleven children. Although it is claimed that the Rodrigues de Sá family is related to the Rodrigues de Jesus, no documentary evidence supports this.

According to the IBGE, Caruaru is a regional capital classified as category B, playing a significant centralizing role in the Agreste and countryside of Pernambuco. It is a major hub for medical-hospital services, academic institutions, culture, and tourism in the Agreste. The municipality is also renowned for its grand June Festivals. It hosts the Feira de Caruaru, recognized as the world’s largest open-air market and designated an intangible cultural heritage of Brazil by the National Institute of Historic and Artistic Heritage (IPHAN). Its clay craftsmanship gained worldwide recognition through the work of Vitalino Pereira dos Santos, known as Mestre Vitalino, who represented Pernambuco at the 1955 Brazilian Primitive and Modern Art Exhibition in Neuchâtel, Switzerland. His works are displayed at the Louvre Museum in Paris and at his former residence in the Alto do Moura neighborhood of Caruaru. Mestre Vitalino’s followers have made Caruaru the largest center of figurative art in the Americas, according to UNESCO.

== Etymology ==
Several hypotheses explain the origin of the toponym Caruaru. One widely accepted theory suggests it derives from the dialect of the Cariri people, who inhabited the region during the 16th-century exploration. In their language, "caru" can mean "food" or "abundance," and "aru aru" can mean "plenty." Thus, Caruaru could translate to "land of abundance." The IBGE’s "Brazilian Territorial Documentation" notes various meanings linked to pathological conditions but adds another definition: the name may come from a plant commonly known as caruru (a type of amaranth) that once covered a well on the banks of the Ipojuca River, leading to the area being called Sítio do Caruru. Over time, an additional vowel transformed it into Caruaru. The Houaiss Dictionary lists two meanings: 1) synonymous with curuaí (from Tupi curuá’i), the plant Orbignya sabulosa, a type of palm common in the region; 2) synonymous with jacuraru (from Tupi yakurua’u), a common lizard known as tegu, also prevalent in the area.

== History ==
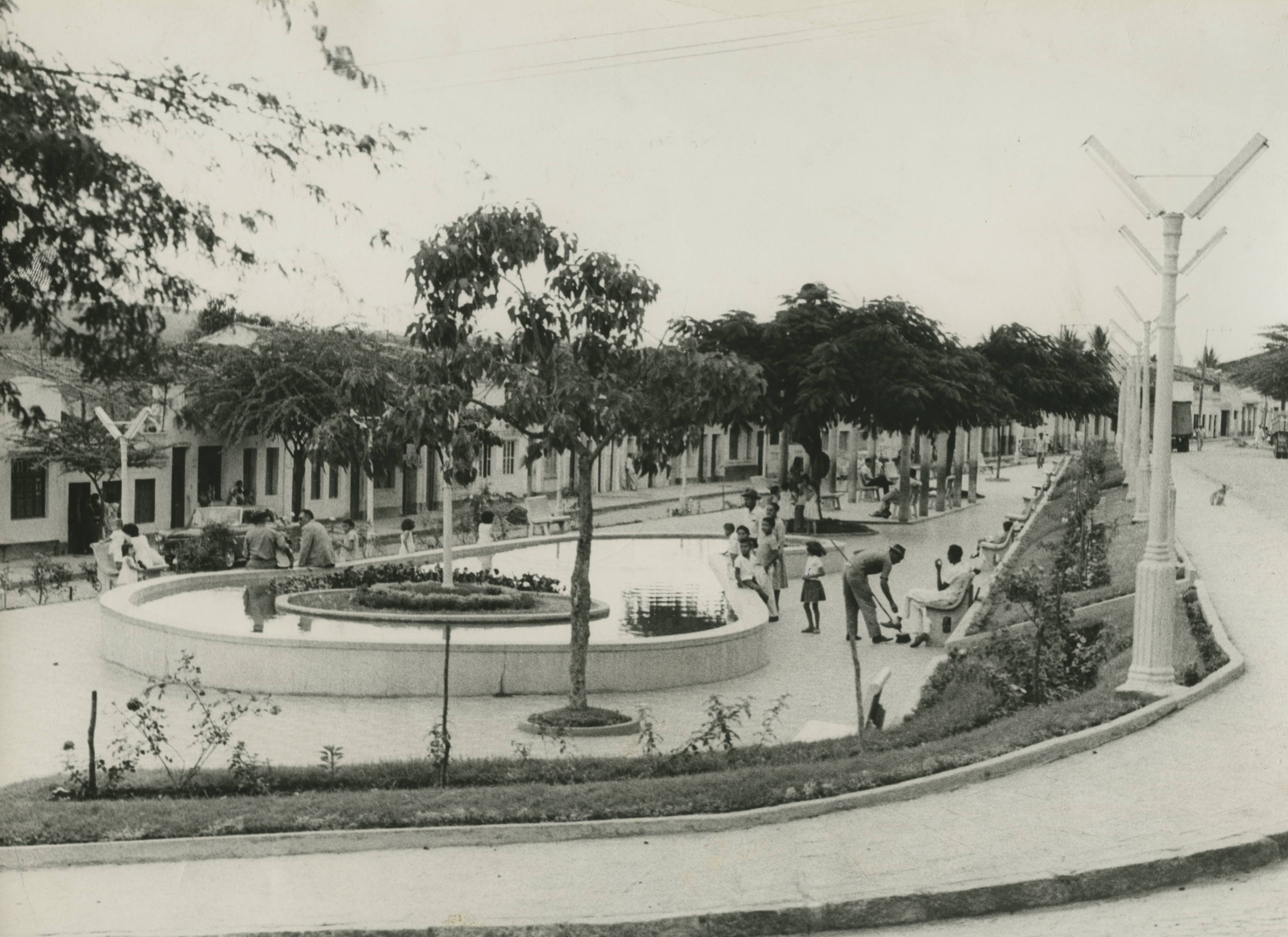
Caruaru, June 1966. National Archives

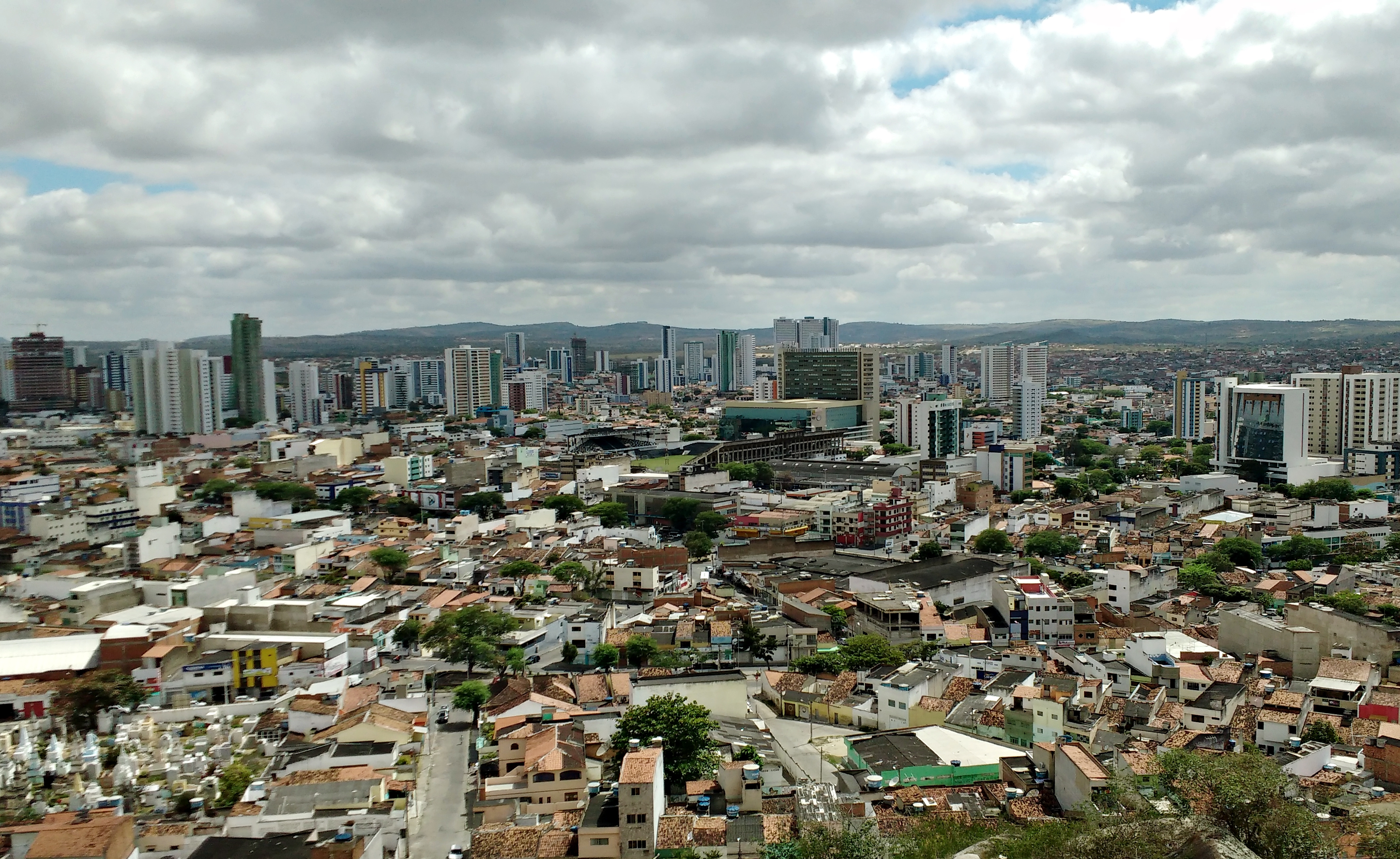
Partial view of Caruaru from Monte Bom Jesus in September 2016

Due to its advantageous geographic position in the heart of the Agreste, a mandatory passage for cattle transport from the Sertão to the coast, numerous agro-pastoral properties were soon established. The lands where Caruaru now stands were owned by the Vidal de Souza and Almeida Pereira families. Land sale records and parish documents confirm that the Vidal de Souza family held large tracts along the Ipojuca River, including the Caruru area. José Rodrigues’ wife was a granddaughter of pioneer João Alvares Vidal, mentioned in 1758 as a cattle ranch owner whose farm was attacked by Antônio Vieira de Mello’s henchmen. No documentation clarifies how the Caruru farm passed to José Rodrigues, whether by purchase or inheritance. Baptism records and inventory transcriptions show that José Rodrigues de Jesus was already married by 1774, the year of the earliest recorded birth of one of his children, indicating he was married well before the 1782 inauguration of the Conceição Chapel. With permission from the Olinda Bishopric in 1781, he built the Nossa Senhora da Conceição Chapel, which spurred the creation of a weekly market and became a focal point for new settlers, increasing the population in the central area. Documents from 1794 confirm the existence of a village with a "considerable number of houses," already known by its current name.

In 1834, Caruaru was listed as the 7th district of Bonito, as noted in a letter dated 8 November of that year from Bonito’s municipal chamber to the Pernambuco Government Council. Provincial Law No. 133 of 6 May 1844 (some records cite 2 May) created the São Caetano da Raposa district, annexed to the municipality of Caruaru. In 1846, Capuchin missionary Friar Euzébio de Sales from Penha began constructing the main church, now the cathedral. Rebuilt twice, the last time in 1883, the church received a bell that year, still in place today, the largest votive offering in the region. It was a promise by Francisco Gomes de Miranda Leão, who transported the offering on animal backs from Tapera to Caruaru, where it was enthusiastically received by the population. On 16 August 1848, Provincial Law No. 212 elevated Caruaru to the status of village, with territory detached from Bonito. This law transferred the parish seat from São Caetano da Raposa to Nossa Senhora das Dores in Caruaru, along with the Bonito judicial district seat. Article 3 of the same law divided the judicial district into two municipalities: the first comprising the parishes of Caruaru, Bezerros, and Altinho, and the second including Bonito and Panelas.

The municipal chamber was established on 16 September 1849, as reported in a letter to the province president, by Francisco Xavier de Lima, president of Bonito’s council. The first vicar of the parish was Father Antonio Jorge Guerra, who established it on 28 September of the same year. On 18 May 1857, Provincial Law No. 416 elevated Caruaru’s village to city and municipal seat status. On 20 May 1867, Provincial Law No. 720 created the Caruaru judicial district, classified as 1st instance by Decree No. 3,978 of 12 October of the same year; the first judge was Antonio Buarque de Lima. On 13 November 1872, Decree No. 5,139 reclassified it as 2nd instance.

Caruaru became a municipality on 1 March 1893, under Article 2 of the general provisions of State Law No. 52 (Municipal Organic Law) of 3 August 1892. The first elected mayor was Major João Salvador dos Santos. A report attached to a 26 May 1893 letter from the mayor to the Government Secretary stated that the municipality was divided into three administrative districts: Caruaru (municipal seat), Carapotós, and São Caetano da Raposa.

Caruaru was established as the second municipality in the Pernambuco Agreste through project No. 20, proposed by provincial deputy Francisco de Paula Batista (1811–1881), debated on 3 April 1857 and enacted without further debate on 18 May 1857 through Provincial Law No. 416, signed by the then vice-president of Pernambuco, Joaquim Pires Machado Portela. Over the decades, the city developed, and the former Caruru Village is now known by various titles such as "Capital of the Agreste," "Capital of Forró," and "Princess of the Agreste," reflecting its political and economic significance in Pernambuco.

The municipality’s development peaked from 1896 with the construction of the Great Western, a railway connecting the city to the Pernambuco capital. Through its tracks, agricultural products and goods from its traditional market were transported. Initiated in 2001 by the Pernambuco government, the expansion of the main highway accessing the municipality, BR-232, was pivotal for industrializing its economy and boosting the service sector, as it reduced travel time and increased safety, attracting more tourists during certain periods. The first section, from Recife to Caruaru, began in 2001 and was completed in 2003, followed by the Caruaru-São Caetano section.

== Geography ==
According to the Brazilian Institute of Geography and Statistics, the municipal territory spans 923.150 square kilometres (356.430 sq mi), with 80.561 square kilometres (31.105 sq mi) classified as urban area. It is located at 08°17'00" south latitude and 35°58'34" west longitude, approximately 130 kilometres (81 mi) from the state capital. Its neighboring municipalities are Brejo da Madre de Deus and São Caetano to the west; Taquaritinga do Norte, Toritama, Vertentes, and Frei Miguelinho to the north; Riacho das Almas and Bezerros to the east; and Altinho and Agrestina to the south.

The municipality lies within the Borborema Province geo-environmental unit, characterized by high massifs and hills with altitudes ranging from 600 to 1,000 meters. The relief is predominantly rugged, with deep and dissected valleys, and an average elevation of 554 meters above sea level. Located on the Borborema Plateau, its highest point is Monte Bom Jesus, at 630 meters above sea level.

The municipal territory is crossed by perennial rivers with low flow and limited groundwater potential. It is part of the Ipojuca River and Capibaribe River basins, with major watercourses including the Tabocas, Caiçara, Borba, da Onça, Olho d’água, Mandacaru do Norte, Caparatós, São Bento, Curtume, and Taquara streams. Its main water reservoirs are the Eng°. Gercino de Pontes (13,600,000 m^{3}), Taquara (1,100,000 m^{3}), Guilherme (786,000 m^{3}), Serra dos Cavalos (761,000 m^{3}), and Jaime Nejaim (100,000 m^{3}) dams.

=== Climate ===
According to the Köppen climate classification, Caruaru's climate is semi-arid (BSh), featuring hot, dry summers and mild, relatively rainy winters. This is due to orographic precipitation in the Borborema Plateau, between the municipalities of Gravatá and Pombos, which acts as a barrier, limiting heavier rainfall in Caruaru.

Winds are constant year-round, but the arrival of weather systems and the formation of high-level cyclonic vortices off the Northeast coast can cause strong winds, leading to damage such as roof tiles being blown off, fallen trees, and power outages. According to the Pernambuco Water and Climate Agency (Apac), which began measurements in March 2010, the lowest recorded temperature in Caruaru was 11.7 °C on 21 July 2016, and the highest was 35.9 °C in November 2015.

Climate data for Caruaru (1991–2020)
Month	Jan	Feb	Mar	Apr	May	Jun	Jul	Aug	Sep	Oct	Nov	Dec	Year
Mean daily maximum °C (°F)	30.6 (87.1)	30.3 (86.5)	30.2 (86.4)	29.2 (84.6)	27.6 (81.7)	25.5 (77.9)	24.6 (76.3)	25.1 (77.2)	27.1 (80.8)	29.2 (84.6)	30.4 (86.7)	30.9 (87.6)	28.4 (83.1)
Daily mean °C (°F)	23.7 (74.7)	23.7 (74.7)	23.8 (74.8)	23.5 (74.3)	22.5 (72.5)	21.2 (70.2)	20.3 (68.5)	20.3 (68.5)	21.3 (70.3)	22.5 (72.5)	23.4 (74.1)	23.7 (74.7)	22.5 (72.5)
Mean daily minimum °C (°F)	19.7 (67.5)	19.7 (67.5)	20.0 (68.0)	20.0 (68.0)	19.5 (67.1)	18.8 (65.8)	17.8 (64.0)	17.5 (63.5)	17.8 (64.0)	18.4 (65.1)	18.9 (66.0)	19.3 (66.7)	19.0 (66.2)
Average precipitation mm (inches)	40.8 (1.61)	50.1 (1.97)	68.4 (2.69)	80.1 (3.15)	86.1 (3.39)	97.9 (3.85)	90.4 (3.56)	59.0 (2.32)	24.8 (0.98)	10.9 (0.43)	10.5 (0.41)	14.6 (0.57)	633.7 (24.95)
Average precipitation days	5	5	7	9	11	14	16	12	6	2	3	3	93
Source: Atlas Climatológico do Estado de Pernambuco

=== Ecology and environment ===
Until early 2013, the municipal government lacked a dedicated environmental department, with environmental policies managed solely by the Infrastructure Secretariat. However, following the re-election of Mayor José Queiroz de Lima in 2013, a municipal reform created the Special Secretariat for the Environment, linked directly to the mayor’s office.

The predominant vegetation consists of plants typical of the caatinga biome, with remnants of Atlantic Forest in high-altitude wetlands. The municipality has only one conservation unit, the Professor João Vasconcelos Sobrinho Municipal Natural Park, commonly known as Serra dos Cavalos Park, located on the border with Altinho, covering 359 hectares of protected area.

The caatinga features hyperxerophytic species, with twisted-branched shrubs and deep-rooted plants. Common species include cacti, caroá, aroeira, angico, juazeiro, mandacaru, and dildo cactus. The Atlantic Forest, typical of the Caatinga moist-forest enclaves in the southern part of the municipality, comprises medium to large trees, forming a dense, closed forest. Rich in biodiversity, large trees create a microclimate with shade and high humidity. Common species include palm trees, bromeliads, begonias, orchids, vines, bryophytes, Brazilwood, jacaranda, peroba, jequitibá-rosa, cedar, andira, pineapple, and fig trees.

== Demography ==
Historical population
Year	Pop.	±%
1970	142,653	—
1980	172,532	+20.9%
1991	213,697	+23.9%
2000	253,634	+18.7%
2010	314,912	+24.2%
2022	378,048	+20.0%
2024 (est.)	402,290	+6.4%
Source: IBGE

According to the 2010 IBGE census, Caruaru had 314,912 inhabitants, with a majority being female, totaling 165,759 women (52.5% of the population), and 149,153 men (47.4%). Additionally, 279,589 residents (approximately 88.78%) lived in the urban area, while 35,323 (about 11.2%) resided in the rural area. The urbanization rate was 88.78%.

Of the total population in 2010, 78,066 residents (24.79%) were under 15 years old, 214,848 (68.22%) were aged 15 to 64, and 21,998 (6.99%) were over 65, with a life expectancy at birth of 73.0 years and a total fertility rate of 2.0 children per woman. Caruaru’s Human Development Index (HDI) is 0.677, considered medium by the United Nations Development Programme (UNDP), ranking eleventh in the state and above Pernambuco’s average of 0.673. Despite its state prominence, its HDI is below the national average, ranking 2503rd among Brazil’s 5,570 municipalities.

In 2010, based on IBGE census self-declarations, the population consisted of 158,762 whites (50.51%), 11,521 blacks (3.66%), 2,273 Asians (0.72%), 141,972 pardos (45.08%), and 384 indigenous people (0.12%). By region of birth, 305,186 were born in the Northeast (96.91%), 7,704 in the Southeast (2.45%), 376 in the South (0.12%), 376 in the Central-West (0.12%), and 297 in the North (0.09%). 294,979 residents were born in Pernambuco (93.67%), of which 217,350 were born in Caruaru (69.02%). Among the 19,933 residents born in other states, São Paulo had the highest representation with 6,628 people (2.10%), followed by Paraíba with 3,693 (1.17%), and Alagoas with 3,169 (1.01%).

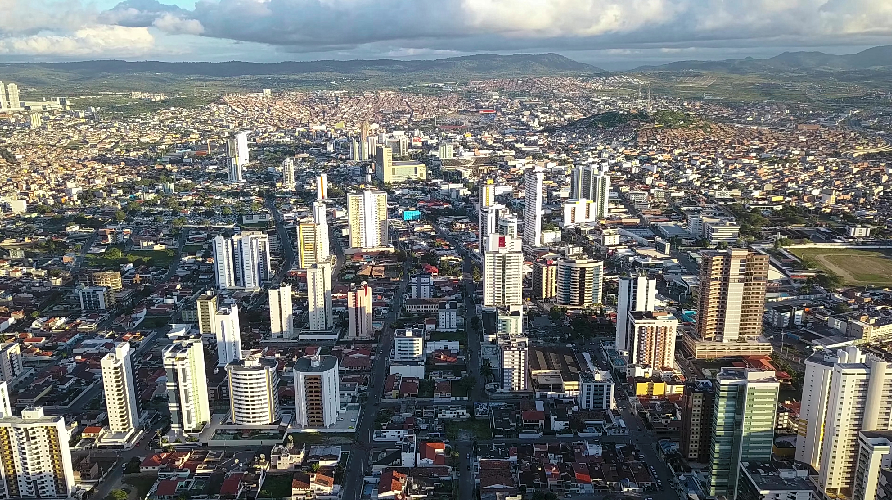
Aerial view of Caruaru

=== Poverty and inequality ===
From 2000 to 2010, the number of people with a per capita household income of up to half the minimum wage decreased by 41.6%. In 2010, 82.5% of the population lived above the poverty line, 10.5% were at the poverty line, and 6.9% were below it. The Gini coefficient, which measures social inequality, was 0.542, where 1.00 is the worst and 0.00 is the best. The richest 20% of the population accounted for 57.6% of the city’s total income, 16.1 times higher than the 3.84% share of the poorest 20%.

Despite having fewer than 300,000 inhabitants in its urban area, small slums exist in some areas. Although Monte Bom Jesus is considered a neighborhood in the urban structure, it has recently taken on slum-like characteristics due to rapid, unplanned demographic growth. Small slums are also recorded in other parts, such as the Bonanza community in the Rosanópolis neighborhood. No official municipal report details the number or characteristics of the population living in slums; only IBGE data is available. According to the 2010 IBGE census, the municipality has about 96,379 households, with 4,231 in slums, occupied by 13,418 residents.

=== Religion ===
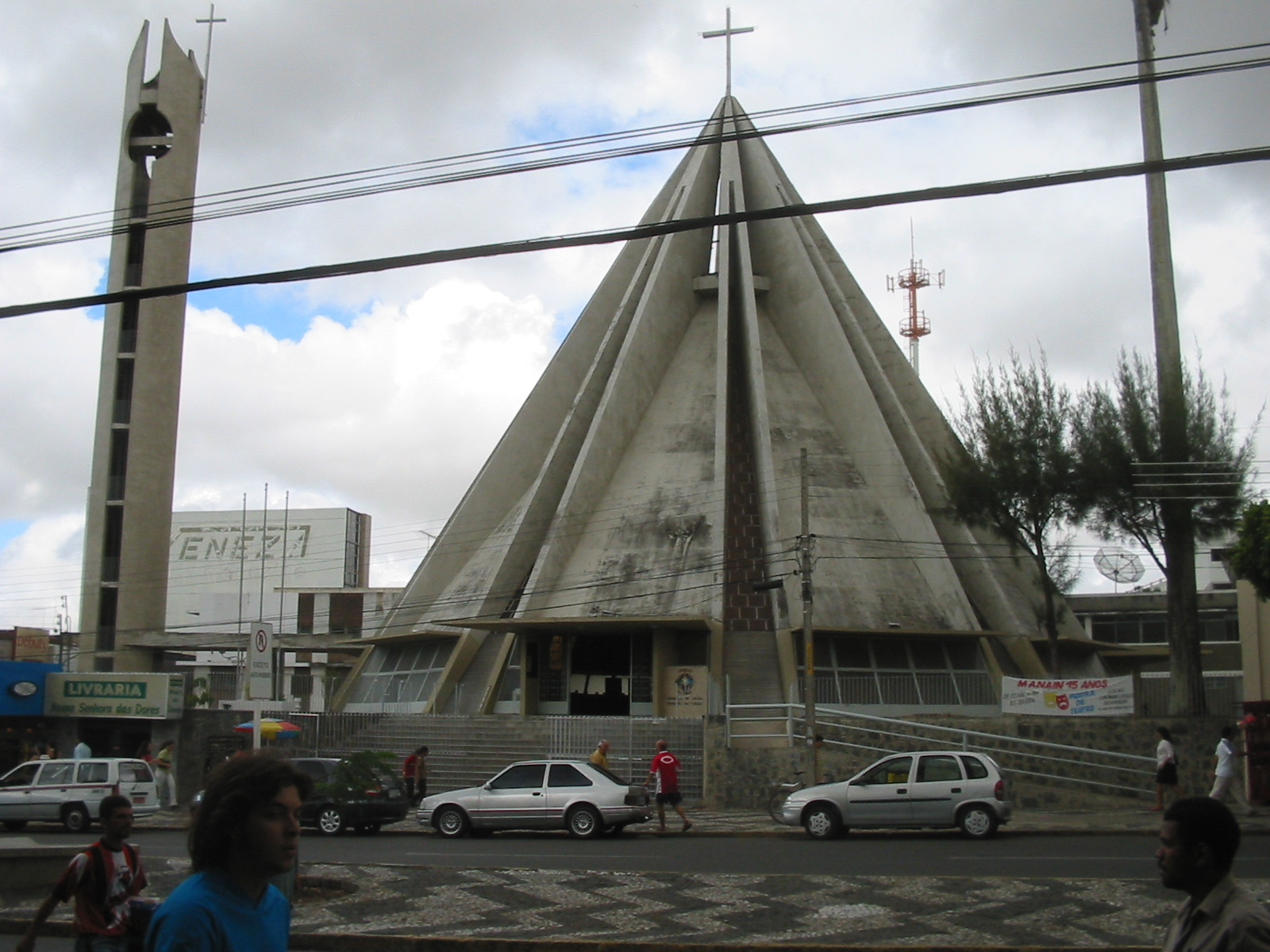
Our Lady of Sorrows Cathedral

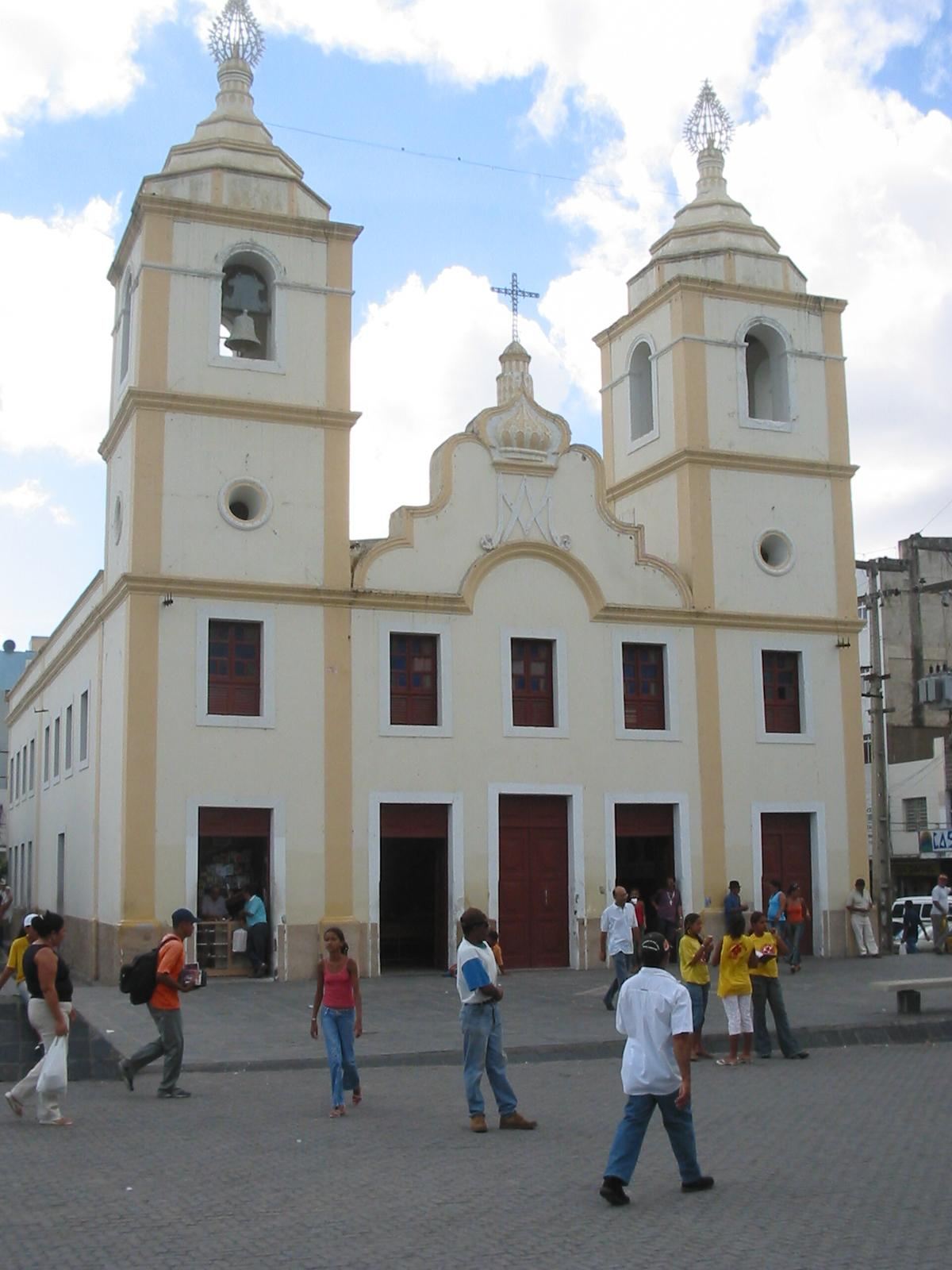
Our Lady of Conception Church

Christianity, particularly Catholicism, has been significant in Caruaru’s history since at least 1781, when the Our Lady of Conception Chapel was built, marking the institutional beginning of Catholicism in the city. The Diocese of Caruaru was established on 7 August 1948 by Pope Pius XII through the bull Quae Maiori Christifidelium. It is part of the Archdiocese of Olinda and Recife. The diocese’s episcopal see is the Our Lady of Sorrows Cathedral, with 29 parishes divided into three pastoral regions: central, northern, and southern. The current bishop, since 2019, is José Ruy Gonçalves Lopes. The patron saint of Caruaru is Our Lady of Sorrows, with an annual festival held in her honor.

The main religious educational institutions in the city are the Catholic schools Sagrado Coração and Diocesano. Sagrado Coração, founded on 8 September 1920 under the initiative of Canon Osvaldo Brasileiro with permission from the Olinda archdiocese, is managed by the Benedictine Missionary Sisters of Tutzing and was the first Catholic school built in Pernambuco’s countryside. The Diocesano, previously called Caruaru Gymnasium and School, was founded on 2 February 1927 by Father Júlio Cabral de Medeiros, José Florêncio de Souza Leão, and Luiz Pessoa da Silva, and is one of the most important schools in Pernambuco’s countryside.

The most influential evangelical denominations in the city are the Assemblies of God, House of Blessing, Adventists, and Baptists. Less prominent denominations include Jehovah’s Witnesses, representing just over 0.7% of the population, and members of The Church of Jesus Christ of Latter-day Saints, accounting for about 0.1%.

The 2010 IBGE census showed that most Caruaru residents declared themselves Catholic (64.6%), though Spiritism (2.0%) and various evangelical denominations (22.1%) are also common. Other religions include African religions such as Umbanda and Candomblé (0.3% combined), and Eastern religions such as Hinduism, Judaism, and Buddhism, with the latter having a minimally significant number of adherents (0.1%). Practitioners of esoteric traditions are few (0.04%). Those who declared no religion accounted for 8.0%, and atheists 0.3%.

== Politics and subdivisions ==
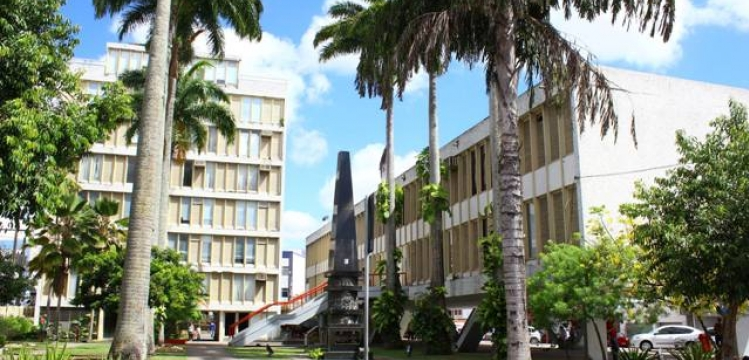
Caruaru City Hall with the Jobson Figueiredo obelisk

The municipality is governed by the executive power and the legislative power. In 2020, candidate Raquel Lyra of the Brazilian Social Democracy Party (PSDB) was re-elected in the first round with 114,466 votes, equivalent to 66.86% of valid votes (excluding blank and null votes). In second place was Delegado Lessa (PP), with 32,910 votes (19.22%). Raquel Lyra is the first woman to be elected mayor of Caruaru.

The municipal legislative power is exercised by the municipal chamber, composed of 23 councilors elected for four-year terms (per Article 29 of the Constitution) and is structured as follows: seven seats for PSDB, three for CID, two for PTB, two for PP, two for PMDB, one for PDT, one for PSD, one for DEM, one for the Republicans, one for PODE, one for PSL, and one for PROS. The council is responsible for drafting and voting on fundamental laws for administration and the executive, particularly the participatory budget (Budget Guidelines Law).

The municipality operates under an organic law, promulgated on 5 April 1990 and effective from the same date, and serves as the seat of the Caruaru Judicial District. According to the Pernambuco Regional Electoral Court, in 2020, the municipality had 225,164 voters, making it the fourth largest electoral college in Pernambuco and the largest in the Agreste.

The municipal territory is divided into four districts: Carapotós, Gonçalves Ferreira, Lajedo do Cedro, and the seat district. The seat district is the most populous, with 291,371 inhabitants, followed by Carapotós with 17,038. Carapotós was created by State Decree-Law No. 3 on 15 November 1896. Lajedo do Cedro was established by State Decree-Law No. 271 on 15 October 1953, and Gonçalves Ferreira by State Decree-Law No. 289 on 30 December 1953. In 2010, the IBGE recorded 24 neighborhoods, with Salgado being the most populous, with 51,503 residents.

Districts of Caruaru (IBGE/2010)
District	Population			Private households
District	Men	Women	Total	Private households
Carapotós	8,625	8,413	17,038	6,774
Gonçalves Ferreira	2,557	2,582	5,139	1,983
Lajedo do Cedro	707	657	1,364	606
Caruaru	137,264	154,107	291,371	105,258

== Sister cities ==
Caruaru's sister cities are:

- Vila Nova de Famalicão, Portugal

== Economy ==
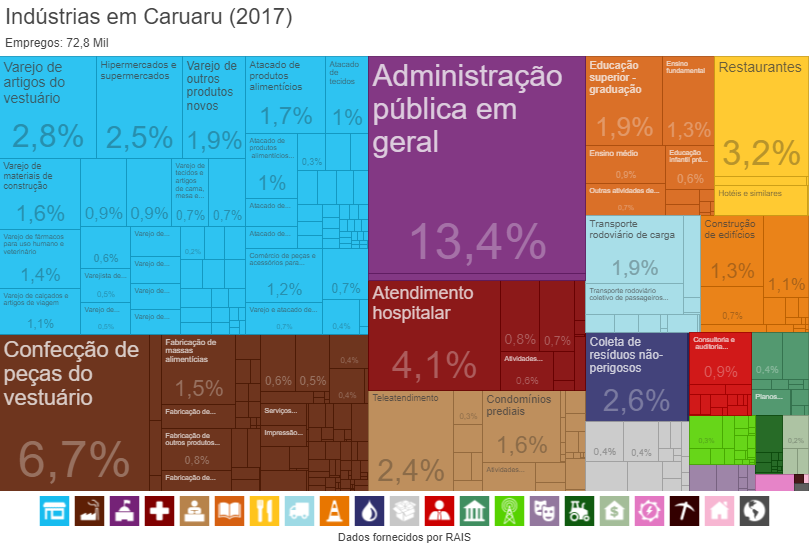
Economic activities in Caruaru by number of employees (2017)

Caruaru's gross domestic product is the 181st largest in Brazil and the 5th largest in Pernambuco. According to the 2011 Regional Accounts, the Brazilian Institute of Geography and Statistics calculated the gross GDP at R$3,407,458,000, with R$468,871,000 in taxes on products net of subsidies at current prices. The GDP per capita was R$10,662.30.

In 2010, 68.04% of the population over 18 was economically active, with an unemployment rate of 6.70%. In 2011, there were approximately 8,424 local units and 7,857 active companies and commercial establishments. A total of 74,665 workers were employed, with 65,001 as salaried employees. Salaries and other remunerations totaled R$763,186, with an average monthly wage of 1.7 minimum wages. According to the IBGE, 68.61% of households lived on less than one minimum wage per person monthly, 21.54% earned between one and three minimum wages per person, 2.95% received between three and five minimum wages, 2.02% had incomes above five minimum wages, and 4.88% had no income.

== Primary sector ==
The primary sector is the least significant in Caruaru's economy. Of the total wealth generated in the municipality, only R$19,699 come from agriculture and livestock activities, while in 2010, 5.86% of the municipality's economically active population was employed in this sector. According to the livestock census, in 2012, the municipality had approximately 23,250 cattle, 150 buffalo, 5,500 goats, 460 donkeys, 1,850 horses, 820 mules, and 4,200 sheep. It also had 344,810 poultry (roosters, hens, chickens, and chicks), 276,888 laying hens, producing 6,142 eggs. 2,950 cows were milked, yielding 2,360 liters of milk. 3,250 kilograms of honey were produced. There were also 2,950 pigs.

In terms of temporary agriculture, the main crops were cassava (700 tonnes and 100 hectares cultivated), tomato (250 tonnes produced and 8 hectares cultivated), sweet potato (130 tonnes and 20 hectares planted), sugarcane (23,333 kilograms per hectare and 3 hectares cultivated), maize (10 tonnes, with 950 hectares planted and 250 harvested), and beans (6 tonnes, with 620 hectares planted and 120 harvested). In terms of permanent agriculture, the following results were obtained: banana (360 tonnes and 120 hectares cultivated), avocado (12 tonnes and 4 hectares planted), orange (8 tonnes and 3 hectares planted), mango (30 tonnes and 8 hectares cultivated), papaya (9 tonnes and 3 hectares), coconut (15,000 fruits and 5 hectares), and cashew nut (4 tonnes and 30 hectares).

== Secondary sector ==
In 2011, industry was the second largest economic activity in Caruaru. Approximately R$497,573 of the gross domestic product came from the gross value added of the secondary sector, and in 2010, 0.11% of the municipality's workers were employed in the extractive industry, while 22.51% worked in the manufacturing industry. The city is renowned for its textile industry, hosting around 12,000 factories of this type, 30,000 points of sale, and generating 140,000 direct and indirect jobs.

Since the 1980s, Caruaru has been part of the clothing manufacturing hub of the Pernambuco Agreste, the largest of its kind in the Northeast, producing garments sold throughout Brazil and abroad. Since 2004, the city has had the Caruaru Industrial Park, located between Caruaru and Toritama, consisting of four color-coded modules. In addition to shops and kiosks, the park is home to the local campus of the University of Pernambuco (UPE). It temporarily housed the Caruaru campus of the Federal University of Pernambuco (UFPE) from 2006 to 2010, the year the Academic Center of the Agreste (CAA) was inaugurated, and the medical course of the same campus until 2020.

Caruaru is home to the second unit of Porto Digital in the state, known as the "Armazém da Criatividade" (Creativity Warehouse). The unit's construction was announced in May 2014 and inaugurated in October 2015. Located in the Nova Caruaru neighborhood, the hub features creation, prototyping, and editorial centers, including 3D printing, graphic design labs, and photography and video studios. The technological complex is part of Porto Digital's decentralization policy and encompasses six areas: entrepreneurship, experimentation, exhibition, education, coworking, and credit.

== Tertiary sector ==
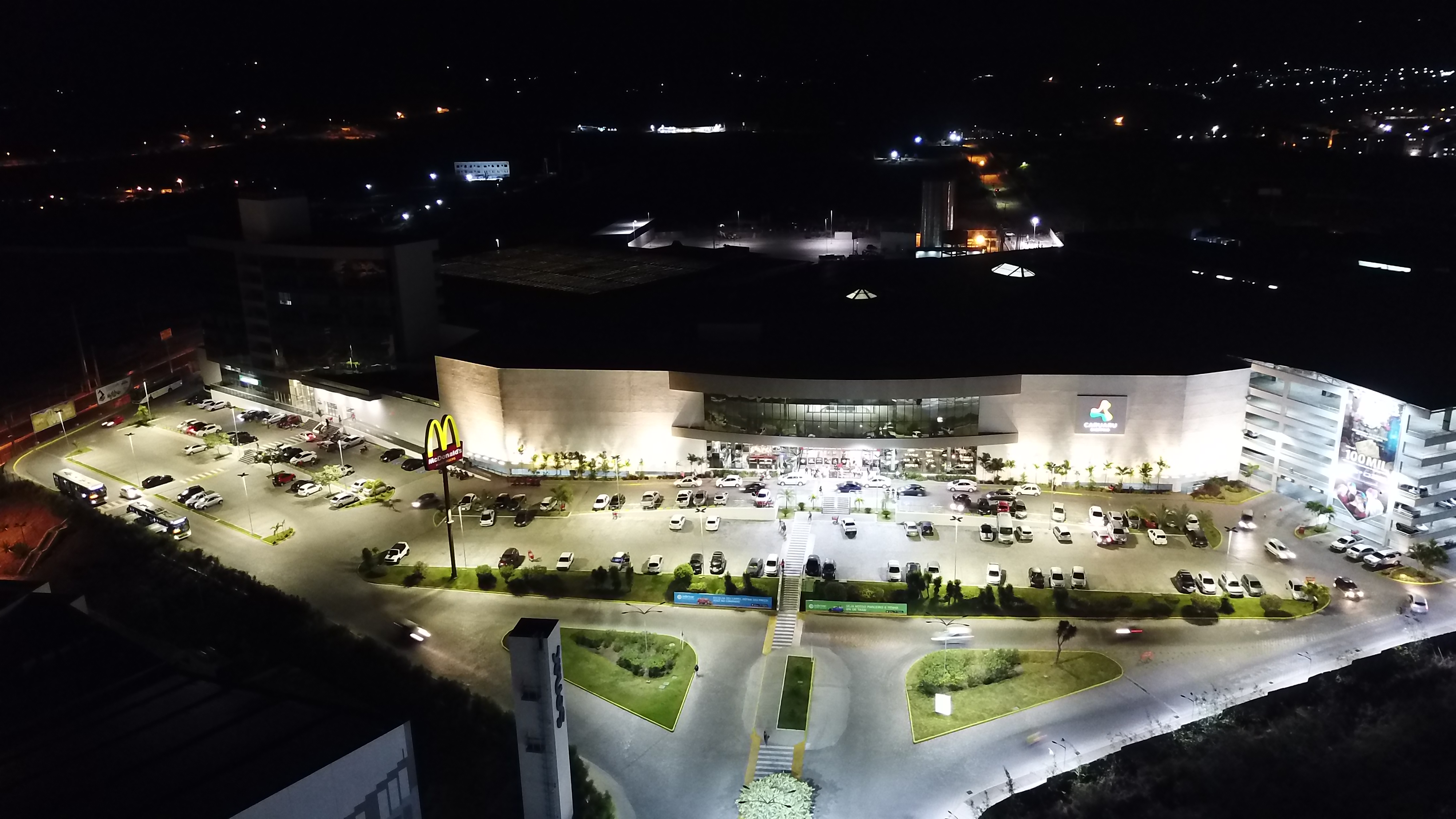
Caruaru Shopping, the first shopping center in the Pernambuco Agreste

In 2010, 5.98% of the employed population worked in construction, 0.89% in public utilities, 23.04% in commerce, and 35.74% in services. In 2011, R$2,421,315 of the municipal GDP came from the gross value added of the tertiary sector, making it the most significant contributor to Caruaru's economy, accounting for approximately 82.4% of the annual wealth produced. The city hosts the largest open-air market in Brazil, the Feira de Caruaru. The market offers a wide variety of products, including fruits, vegetables, cereals, medicinal herbs, meats, as well as manufactured goods such as clothing, footwear, handbags, cookware, furniture, animals, hardware, small items, radios, electronics, and imported goods. According to the Brazilian Institute of Geography and Statistics, approximately 21,918 people work in the city's commerce, and about 20,181 are employed in service activities.

The city has two shopping centers: Caruaru Shopping and Shopping Difusora. The former, previously known as Shopping Center Caruaru (1997–2009) and North Shopping (2009–2015), was inaugurated in 1997 and is the first shopping center in the Pernambuco Agreste. Its construction significantly impacted the city's infrastructure, leading to the verticalization of the Indianapolis neighborhood. The shopping center is near the Ipojuca Valley University Center, a private higher education institution owned by the Wyden Educacional group. Shopping Difusora, opened in 2009, was built on the site of a former radio station of the same name that operated there from 1951 to the 1990s. The construction of Shopping Difusora triggered a similar phenomenon along Agamenon Magalhães Avenue, with the establishment of shops, restaurants, and banks.

== Infrastructure ==
=== Healthcare ===
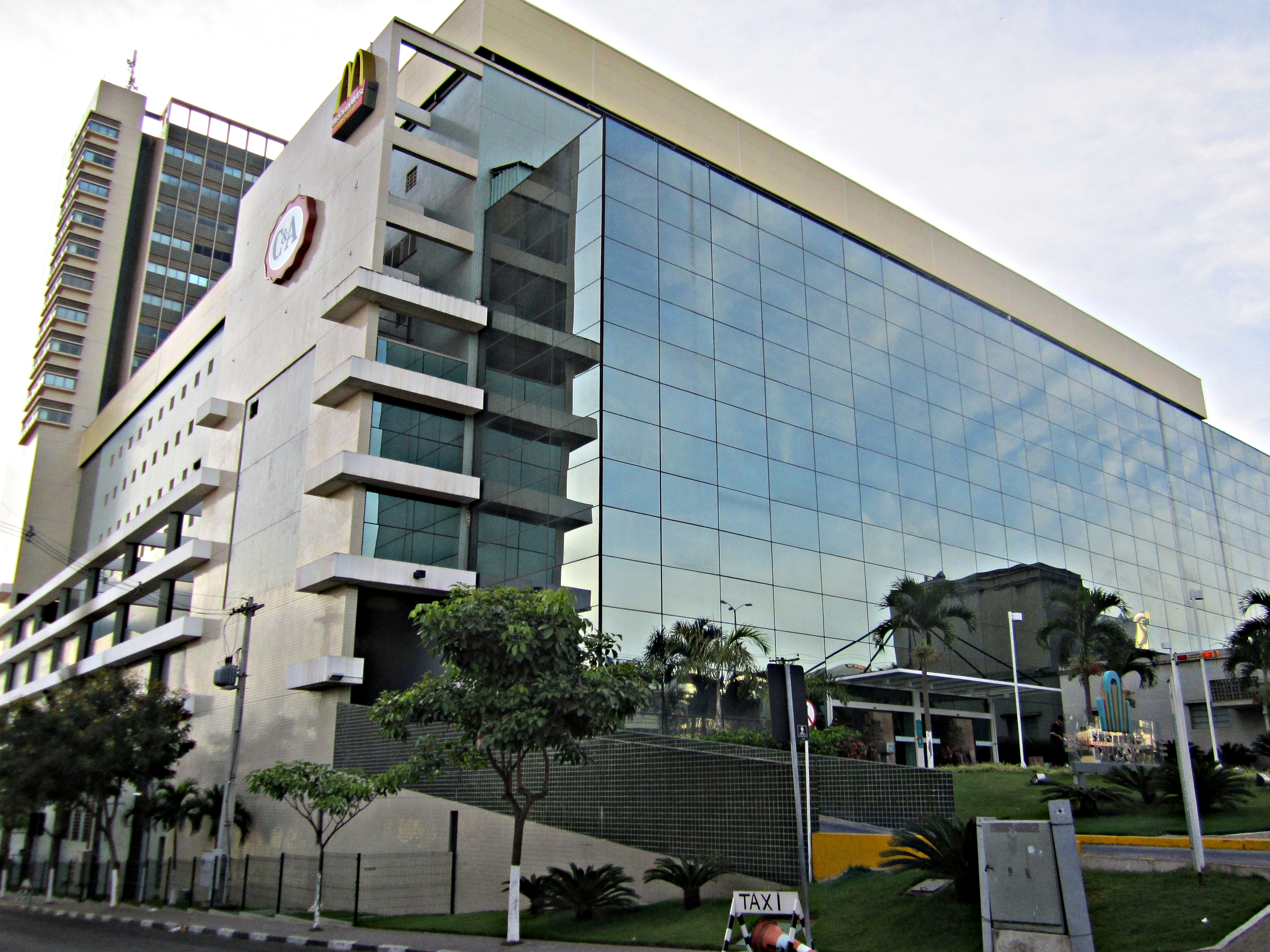
Shopping and business complex Difusora, the second largest shopping center in Caruaru, hosting several clinics

In 2009, the municipality had 176 healthcare facilities, including hospitals, emergency departments, health centers, and dental services, with 90 private and 86 public establishments. These facilities provided 627 hospital beds, with 207 in public establishments and 585 in private ones. In 2012, 98.5% of children under one year old were up to date with their vaccinations. In 2011, there were 5,458 live births, with an infant mortality rate of 16.1 deaths per 1,000 live births for children under five. In 2010, 7.92% of women aged 10 to 17 gave birth, with 0.18% of them aged 10 to 14, and the activity rate in this age group was 7.59%. In 2012, 67,796 children were weighed by the Family Health Program, with 1.2% found to be malnourished. In 2010, Caruaru's Human Development Index (HDI) for longevity was 0.799. According to the Ministry of Health, 665 cases of AIDS were recorded in Caruaru between 1990 and 2012, and between 2001 and 2011, there were 13,002 cases of dengue, 105 cases of leishmaniasis, and five cases of malaria.

In 2013, Caruaru's municipal health network included approximately 46 Family Health Units (USF), with 15 located in rural areas across all districts and 28 in urban areas. The city had six health centers, all in the main district, three regional hospitals, one polyclinic, two hospitals, a SAMU emergency service center, a 24-hour emergency care unit (UPA), and four private hospitals. The Caruaru Health Department, in collaboration with the SUS and other state and federal agencies, is responsible for planning and implementing the municipal public health policy.

=== Education ===
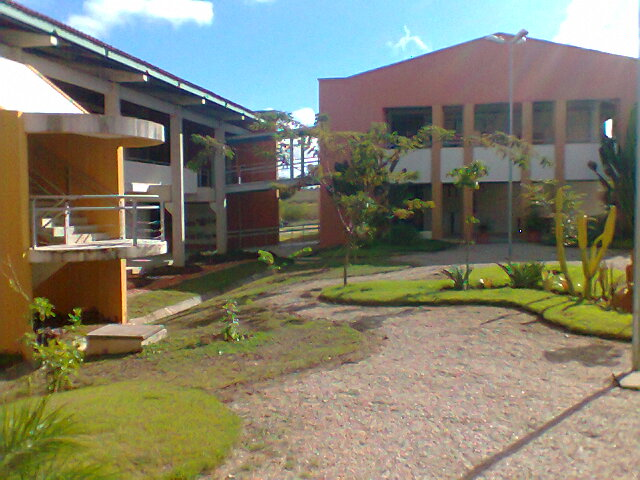
UFPE Academic Center of the Agreste

==== Indicators ====
In the field of education, the Basic Education Development Index (IDEB) average for Caruaru's public schools in 2011 was 3.7 (on a scale from 1 to 10), with fifth-grade students scoring 4.3 and ninth-grade students scoring 3.2, compared to a national public school average of 4.0. The Human Development Index (HDI) for education in 2010 was 0.569.

In 2010, 5.09% of children aged six to fourteen were not attending primary education. The completion rate for youths aged 15 to 17 was 38.0%, and the literacy rate for youths and adolescents aged 15 to 24 was 95.0%. The age-grade distortion in primary education, i.e., students older than the recommended age, was 21.3% for the early years and 32.7% for the later years, while in secondary education, the distortion reached 37.6%. Among residents aged 18 or older, 46.81% had completed primary education, 30.94% had completed secondary education, and the population had an average of 8.89 expected years of schooling.

==== Education network ====
In 2010, according to census sample data, 93,954 inhabitants attended daycares and/or schools. Of these, 2,645 were in daycares, 9,195 in early childhood education, 5,320 in literacy classes, 1,073 in adult literacy programs, 47,759 in primary education, 12,632 in secondary education, 3,973 in adult primary education, 3,221 in adult secondary education, 498 in postgraduate specialization, 7,515 in undergraduate programs, 114 in master's degree programs, and nine in doctoral degree programs. A total of 220,958 people did not attend schools, with 37,170 never having attended and 183,788 having attended at some point. In 2021, the municipality had 73,960 enrollments in educational institutions, with 198 schools offering primary education, including 8 state public schools, at least 106 municipal schools, and a minimum of 75 private schools. (Note: When cataloging schools offering primary education, IBGE distinguishes between those offering early and later years. Since some schools offer both levels and IBGE does not specify how many, only a minimum number of schools is provided.) Caruaru has two public libraries, the Aleixo Leite Filho Municipal Library and the Álvaro Lins Municipal Library.

Education in Caruaru in numbers (2021)
Level	Enrollments	Teachers	Schools (total)
Early childhood education	12,204	635	165
Primary education	49,990	2,108	198
Secondary education	11,766	714	38

==== Higher education ====
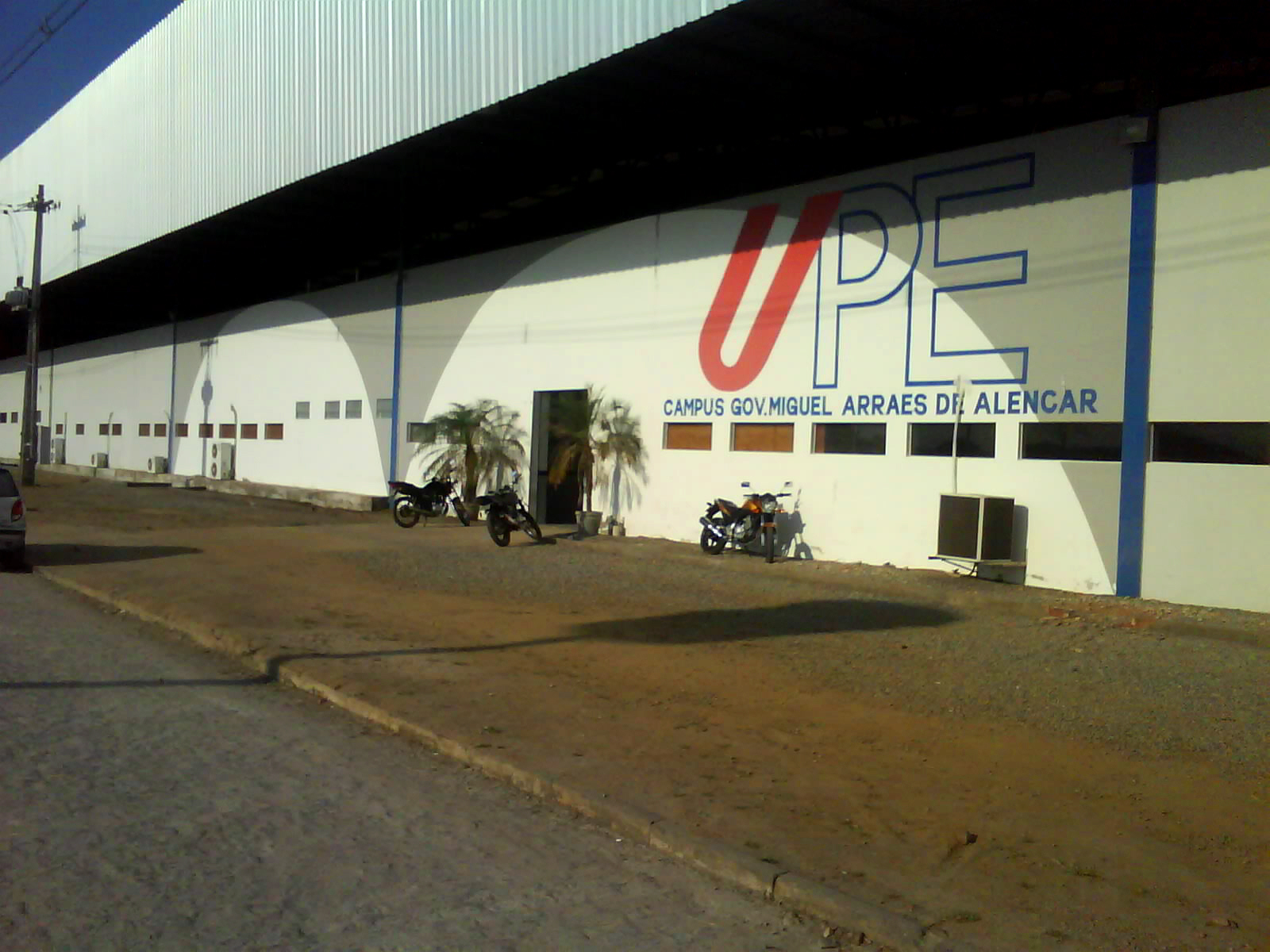
University of Pernambuco (UPE) - Faculty of Science and Technology of Caruaru (FACITEC)

Caruaru is home to campuses of three major state universities: the University of Pernambuco (UPE), offering degrees in Information Systems and Business Administration (with a focus on fashion marketing); the Federal University of Pernambuco (UFPE), providing undergraduate programs in areas such as Pedagogy, Business Administration, Design (with emphases in graphic, fashion, and product design), Civil Engineering, Economics, Medicine, Communication Studies (with emphases in digital media and cultural production), Production Engineering, and teaching degrees in Physics, Chemistry, and Mathematics; and the Federal Institute of Pernambuco (IFPE), offering a degree in Mechanical Engineering. Additionally, the city is home to several private institutions, including the Tabosa de Almeida University Center (ASCES-UNITA), the Faculty of Philosophy, Sciences, and Letters of Caruaru (FAFICA), the University Center of Vale do Ipojuca (UNIFAVIP DeVry), the Maurício de Nassau University (UNINASSAU), and others (Estácio, UNIP, Unit, Unopar, Anhanguera, Fael, Unicesumar). These higher education institutions make Caruaru a regional educational hub, attracting numerous students from neighboring cities and states, either relocating to the municipality or commuting daily.

=== Public safety and crime ===
As is common throughout much of Pernambuco, violence is a significant issue in Caruaru. In 2012, the rate of violent crime per 100,000 inhabitants was 39.60. By 2021, Caruaru's rate of violent crime had decreased to 32.09. In 2008, there were 27 recorded suicides, resulting in a rate of 9.2 suicides per 100,000 inhabitants, ranking 427th nationally and 11th in the state. In the same year, there were approximately 108 workplace accidents, with a rate of 36.7 per 100,000 inhabitants, placing Caruaru 313th nationally and 3rd in the state.

The Pacto pela Vida program, launched by the Pernambuco state government in 2007, addressed the state's high violent crime rate of 55.0 per 100,000 inhabitants at the time. By April 2013, the violent crime rate had fallen to 35.0, a reduction of 20.0 points. In Caruaru, the homicide rate per 100,000 inhabitants was 15.9 in 2007, dropping to 8.38 in the second quarter of 2013, and further to 6.12 in the third quarter of 2022.

Caruaru is home to the Juiz Plácido de Souza Penitentiary, located in the Vassoural neighborhood in the southern zone, part of Pernambuco's prison system, which includes 17 other penitentiaries across the state. With a capacity of 350 inmates, it housed 1,498 prisoners as of August 2013, exceeding its capacity by ten times. The penitentiary offers a rehabilitation program for 60% of its inmates, including literacy courses, vocational training, supplementary education, handicraft production, clothing manufacturing, and sports activities.

In March 2017, the British magazine The Economist ranked Caruaru as the third most violent city in Brazil and one of the most violent in the world. In the same year, the municipal program "Juntos pela Segurança" was launched, resulting in a 50% reduction in homicides and a 70% reduction in violent property crimes between 2017 and 2021. During this period, the violent crime rate in the municipality decreased from 57.06 to 33.79.

=== Housing, services, and communications ===
In 2010, according to IBGE, Caruaru had 96,304 permanent private households, including 86,795 houses, 8,728 apartments, 397 houses in gated communities or condominiums, and 384 tenement houses. Of these, 66,524 were owned, with 64,103 fully paid, 2,421 under acquisition, and 24,973 rented. Additionally, 548 households were provided by employers, and 3,984 were occupied in other ways. Another 275 residences were occupied differently. Most of the municipality has access to treated water, waste collection, sewage, electricity, landline telephone, and mobile phone services. In the same year, 85,522 households were supplied with drinking water from the general network, 95,964 had direct electricity access, 91,993 received waste collection services, and 92,289 had exclusive bathrooms.

The Pernambuco Sanitation Company (Compesa) is responsible for sewage collection and treatment, as well as water supply for Caruaru and all of Pernambuco. In late 2012, the municipalities of the Ipojuca River valley received a $200 million investment from a loan by the Inter-American Development Bank (IDB) to the Pernambuco government. Eighty percent of the funds were allocated to sanitation works, as sewage discharge is the main source of river pollution, with the remaining 20% for educational campaigns. In 2013, according to a study by Instituto Trata Brasil, Caruaru had one of the worst sewage collection and treatment rates in the state, collecting only 40% of wastewater and treating 20%. However, with the state investment, it is expected that the city will approach 100% coverage by 2019 upon completion of the Ipojuca environmental sanitation works, as the river is currently the third most polluted in Brazil. The Pernambuco Energy Company (Celpe) supplies electricity to Caruaru and all 184 municipalities of Pernambuco, as well as the municipality of Pedras de Fogo in Paraíba. Approximately 99.7% of Caruaru's households receive electricity services.

Several television channels operate in the VHF and UHF bands, with some affiliates based in the city, such as TV Jornal Interior (affiliated with SBT), founded in 2006. Caruaru also is home to TV Asa Branca, affiliated with Rede Globo in the Pernambuco Agreste, established on 1 August 1991, with its signal reaching much of the state's countryside. The city has several circulating newspapers, including traditional ones such as "Diário de Pernambuco," "Jornal Extra de Pernambuco," "Jornal do Commercio," "Tribuna de Pernambuco," and "Vanguarda." Caruaru also is home to traditional radio stations such as "Liberdade" AM and FM, "Jornal," and "Cultura do Nordeste."

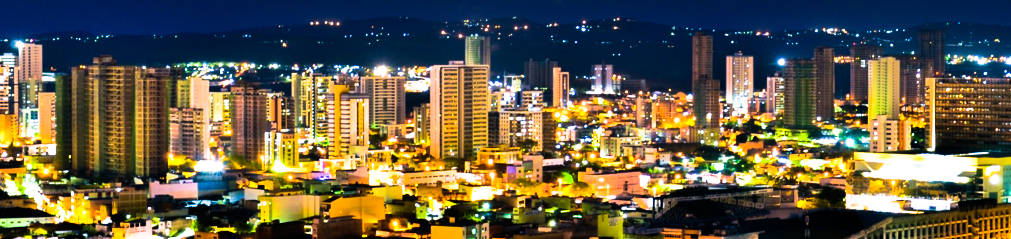
Night view of Caruaru

=== Transportation ===
==== Air ====
The nearest airport is the Recife/Guararapes–Gilberto Freyre International Airport, also known as Guararapes or Gilberto Freyre, located in the Imbiribeira neighborhood in southern Recife, approximately 138 km from downtown Caruaru, accessible primarily via the BR-232 highway. This airport, serving most municipalities in eastern Pernambuco, including the Pernambuco Forest and Agreste Pernambucano regions, has the best infrastructure, the longest runway, the largest physical space, and the most advanced technology in the North/Northeast of Brazil. It is considered the most efficient airport in Brazil and the second most efficient in South America, behind José Joaquín de Olmedo International Airport in Guayaquil, Ecuador.

Caruaru also has its own airport, Oscar Laranjeira. Inaugurated in 1944, it primarily operated executive flights for most of its history. On 25 February 2002, its first commercial flight was scheduled, but the plane got stuck in the runway asphalt, which collapsed. After renovations, the airport operated commercial flights between 2006–2007 and 2010–2011, but these were discontinued due to low demand. In July 2018, the airport was closed by the ANAC. However, on 11 November 2020, commercial operations resumed at Oscar Laranjeira with Azul Brazilian Airlines. The airport is managed by the state government, which has invested in its infrastructure.

==== Rail and metro ====
There were plans for the Transnordestina railway to pass through Caruaru, connecting the Suape Port in Ipojuca (southern coast of Pernambuco) to Eliseu Martins in the Piauí cerrado, with another line linking Salgueiro (central sertão) to the Port of Pecém in São Gonçalo do Amarante, Ceará. However, a new route map presented in 2009 excluded Caruaru, passing instead through part of the Mata Sul Pernambucana region. The city retains the railway line of the Great Western, built by the British in 1896, primarily to transport goods such as beans, leather, cotton, and cheese to Recife, and to support one of the region's largest cattle fairs.

==== Road ====
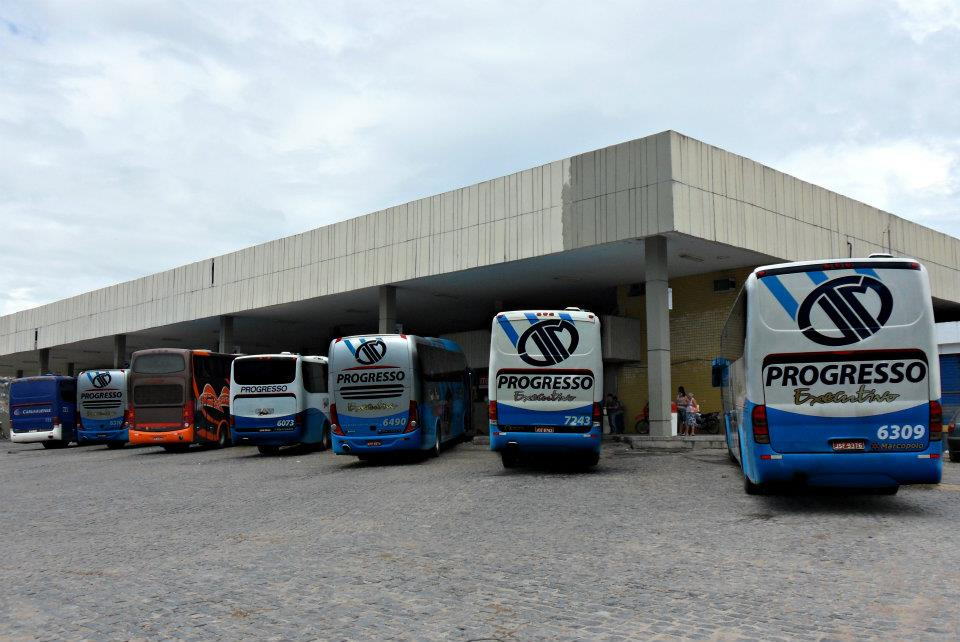
Buses parked at the city's bus terminal

The city's bus terminal, located in the Caiucá neighborhood, is partially adapted for people with disabilities. It features basic amenities, including male and female restrooms (the latter with a changing room), a 24-hour taxi service, seven public telephones at the entrance and near the restrooms, as well as snack bars and convenience stores. Major bus companies operating at the terminal include Borborema, Caruaruense, Coletivo Turismo, Viação Cruzeiro, Guanabara, Itapemirim, Progresso, Expresso São Luiz, and Gontijo.

Caruaru is well-connected by highways to neighboring cities, the state capital, and other Northeastern capitals. The main highways are BR-104 and BR-232. The former starts in Macau, Rio Grande do Norte, and ends in Maceió, Alagoas, with an 86-km dual carriageway section between Agrestina and Toritama. The latter begins in central Recife and ends in Parnamirim in the Pernambuco sertão, with a dual carriageway section from Recife to São Caetano. Additionally, the PE-095 connects to Limoeiro, and the PE-145 links to Brejo da Madre de Deus.

==== Urban ====
The Destra, the municipal authority for public safety, traffic, and transportation, is responsible for planning, regulating, controlling, and overseeing traffic, as well as managing public transportation services, citizen and municipal property safety, and permanent civil defense actions against natural, human-caused, and mixed disasters. Several bus companies, including Tabosa, Bahia, Coletivo, Caruaruense, and Capital do Agreste, transport thousands of passengers daily.

In early 2014, Caruaru's city council approved a BRT project to improve urban mobility, particularly in the city center. The project includes an exclusive bus corridor, similar to a metro system, with accessibility for the elderly and disabled, air-conditioned environments, and a less polluting system. This initiative aims to enhance urban mobility with a public transport corridor from the Rendeiras neighborhood to Alto do Moura, accompanied by a bike lane and 500 paved and sanitized streets.

In 2022, the municipal vehicle fleet consisted of 196,896 vehicles, including 80,617 cars, 5,521 trucks, 812 tractor-trucks, 11,858 pickups, 4,739 vans, 907 minibuses, 66,338 motorcycles, 16,989 scooters, 771 buses, and 8,344 other vehicle types.

== Culture ==
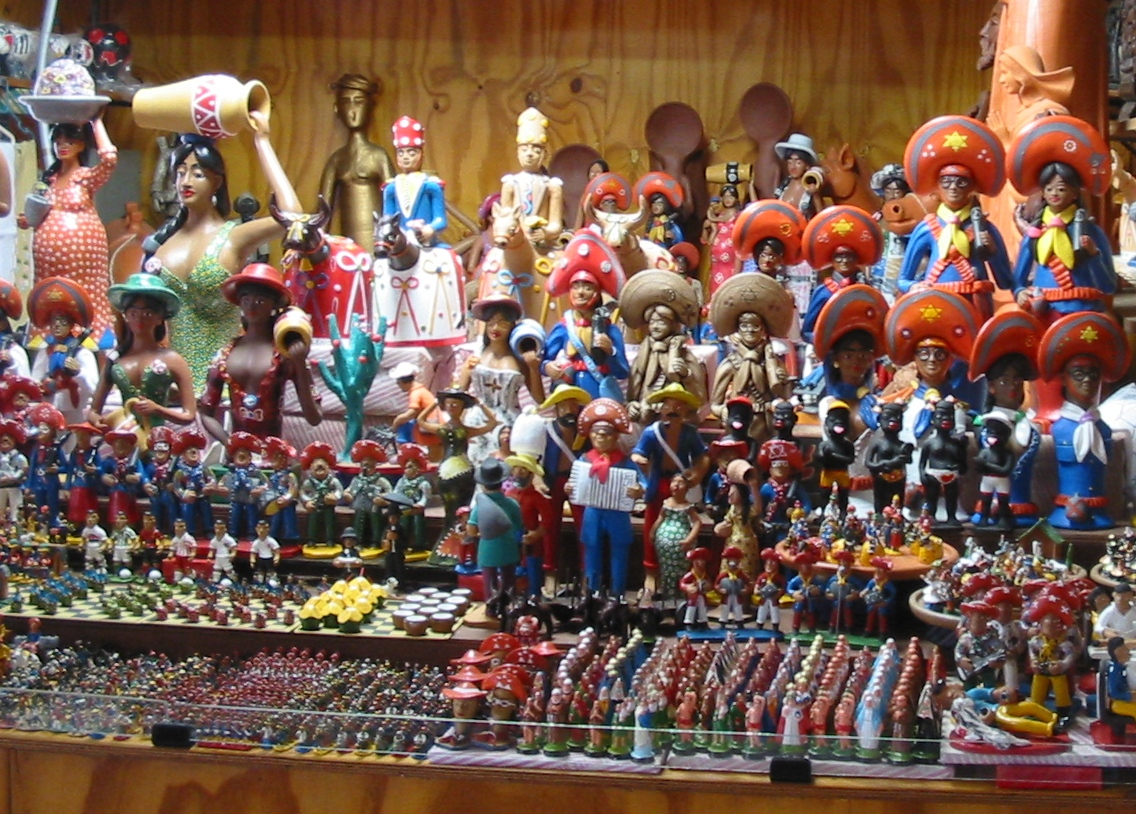
The followers of Pernambuco ceramist Mestre Vitalino have made Caruaru the largest center of figurative art in the Americas, according to UNESCO.

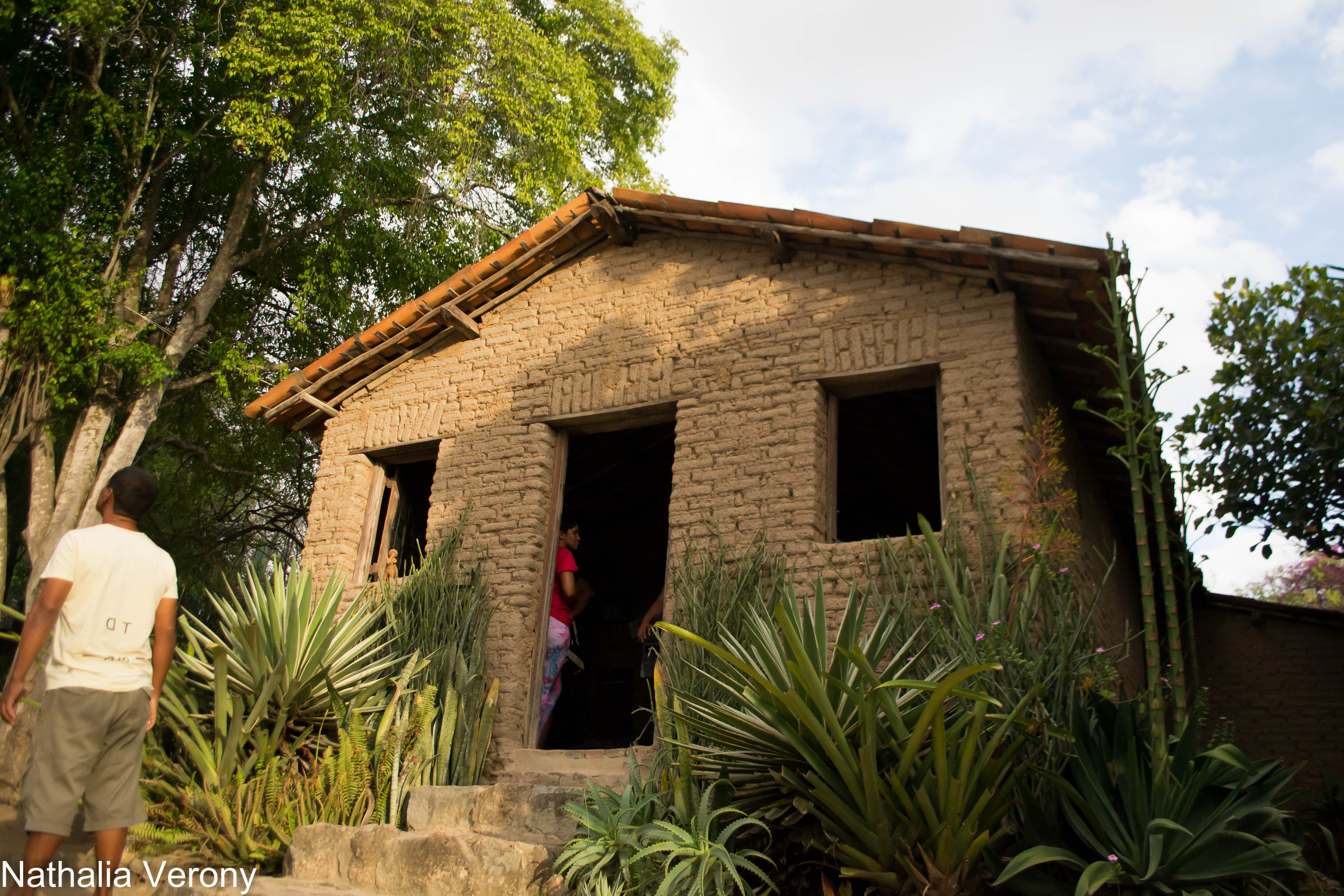
Mestre Vitalino's house-museum

The cultural sector of Caruaru is managed by the Caruaru Culture and Tourism Foundation, which is responsible for planning and implementing cultural policies across all dimensions and expressions. Its primary goal is to support, preserve, and promote the elements that form the city's cultural identity while encouraging tourism. The foundation also oversees the preservation of Caruaru's artistic and historical heritage.

== Notable figures ==
Caruaru is the birthplace of several prominent figures in music, cinema, journalism, and the arts from the state of Pernambuco.

- Petrúcio Amorim, a singer and composer born and raised in the Vassoural neighborhood.
- Prazeres Barbosa, an actress who was a patron of the performing arts for Ariano Suassuna and João Cabral de Melo Neto, and one of the most renowned and awarded actresses in Pernambuco, honored with a statue in her memory.
- Cláudio Assis, a filmmaker and producer of feature films and documentaries.
- Álvaro Lins, a lawyer, journalist, professor, and literary critic who assumed chair 17 of the Brazilian Academy of Letters on April 5, 1955, following the death of writer Edgar Roquette-Pinto.
- Vitalino Pereira dos Santos, known simply as Mestre Vitalino, was an artisan who popularized clay crafts depicting the daily lives of rural residents of Pernambuco. His works gained international recognition, representing Caruaru at the 1955 Brazilian Primitive and Modern Art exhibition in Neuchâtel, Switzerland.
- Banda de Pífanos de Caruaru, formed in 1924 by Manuel Clarindo Biano and Benedito Clarindo Biano.
- Belarmino Maria Austregésilo de Ataíde, a Brazilian journalist, professor, chronicler, essayist, and orator. He served as president of the Brazilian Academy of Letters for 35 years.
- Luiz Jacinto Silva, a Brazilian comedian.

== Performing arts and events ==
Theater in Caruaru emerged under religious influence, as priests were the first to promote this art form in the city during the transition from the 19th to the 20th century. At that time, the Church used theatrical plays to engage with the population. In the first half of the 20th century, cine-theaters were established, which were cinemas that also hosted theatrical performances. The main venues were the Cine Theatro Rio Branco (founded in 1922) and the Cine Theatro Santa Rosa (1947). With Caruaru's economic growth from the 1990s onward, most of these cinemas closed, and today, the only cinemas in the city are commercial ones located in shopping malls. However, the city currently has three theaters: Teatro João Lyra Filho, Teatro Rui Limeira Rosal, and Teatro Difusora.

Since 1981, Caruaru has hosted the FETEAG – Agreste Theater Festival, an event independently organized by the Teatro Experimental de Arte (TEA) group, with support from Funcultura, the Social Service of Commerce (Sesc), and the Culture Foundations of Recife and Caruaru. The festival, which began modestly, is now held in both Recife and Caruaru, having presented over a thousand performances and attracted a total audience of more than 200,000 people. It features both a student and a professional exhibition and is a highlight of Caruaru's artistic scene. In addition to FETEAG, the city hosts the Caruaru Film Festival, an annual event since 2013 aimed at promoting independent audiovisual production and developing the local market.

Although not a major strength of the city, Caruaru has several carnival blocks that parade through its central streets as a preview of the Recife and Olinda carnivals. The main carnival block is organized by Byron Lasserre, owner of Bar Confraria do Sucata, on João Condé Street in the city center. On 15 September, the city celebrates the feast of its patron saint, Our Lady of Sorrows, with masses, processions, and religious and artistic performances. The celebration takes place at the Matrix Church, dedicated to the saint.

== Attractions ==
=== Museums ===
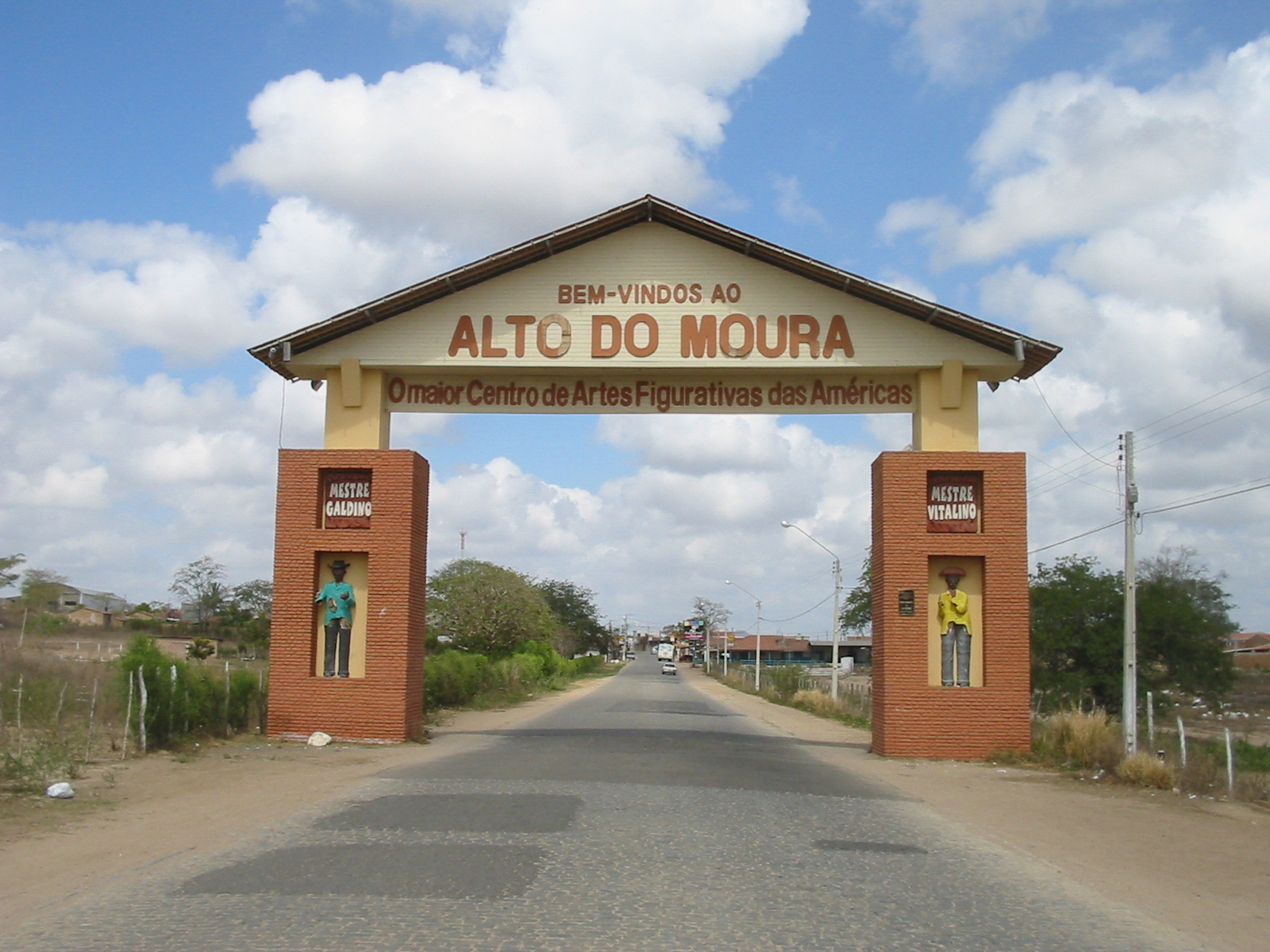
Entrance to Alto do Moura. The pillars feature statues honoring Masters Galdino (left) and Vitalino (right).

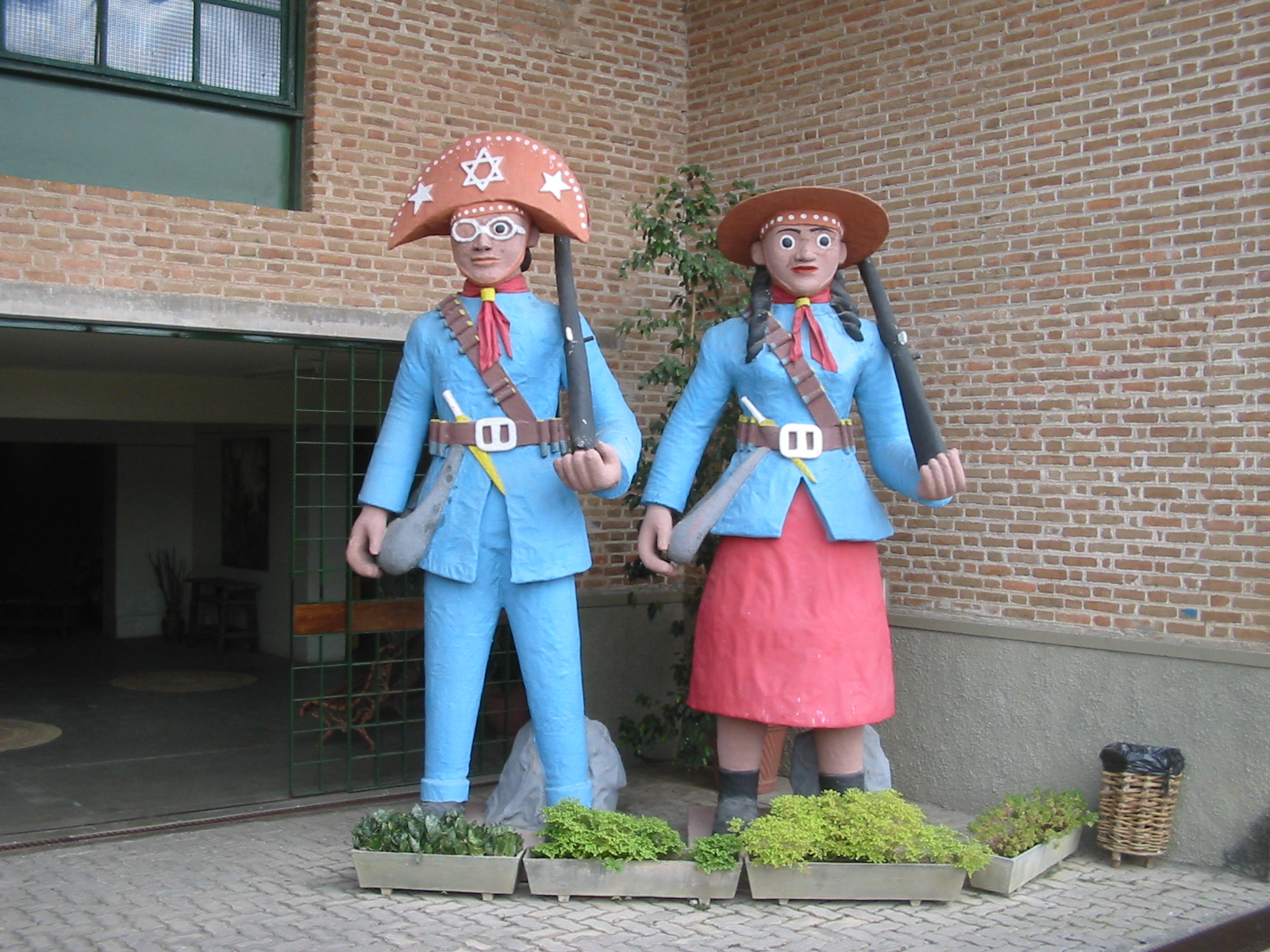
Clay figures at the entrance to the Luiz Gonzaga Museum

Alto do Moura is a neighborhood located 7 km from downtown Caruaru, known as the home of numerous internationally recognized artisans. It remains one of the most significant centers of figurative arts in the Americas. Visitors can explore museums, workshops, regional cuisine restaurants, and bars, as well as cultural attractions based on the regional event calendar. The neighborhood is also home to a distinguished resident, Manuel Eudócio, who was awarded the title of Living Heritage of Pernambuco by Fundarpe.

Caruaru boasts several museums that narrate the city's history and showcase the works of its most notable figures, who have established the region as a significant cultural hub. One of the most famous, the Museu do Barro Espaço Zé Caboclo, adjacent to the Tancredo Neves Cultural Space, offers a cultural showcase with thematic rooms dedicated to Luiz Gonzaga; Saint John and Caruaru artists; Elba Ramalho; Mestre Vitalino and his family; Alto do Moura artisans, featuring exhibitions of figurative, decorative, and utilitarian-decorative clay artifacts; Abelardo Rodrigues, a collection of clay art; and the Luísa Maciel Gallery, displaying paintings that highlight aspects of popular culture. The museum also includes a temporary exhibition room. Also attached to the city's cultural space is the Caroá Factory Museum, which highlights one of the industries that boosted Caruaru's economy. The museum features panels tracing its history from its founding in 1935 by José Vasconcelos to its full operation. The collection includes machinery used in fiber production, including a carding machine, a spinning machine, a thread strength tester, shuttles, bobbins, and leather storage containers for reels. The museum also displays old furniture from the presidential office, a time clock, a telephone, and a typewriter, as well as samples of the caroa plant and its fiber.

In the city center, the Caruaru City Memorial was originally built to serve as a flour market. However, when the city's market was relocated to Parque 18 de Maio, the building lost its original purpose. In 1992, it became the Fair Memorial, and in 2009, it was restored, restructured, and reopened with an expanded collection that now includes panels showcasing the political, social, cultural, religious, economic, and sporting history of the municipality. The Mestre Vitalino House-Museum, located in Alto do Moura, was the last residence of Caruaru's most famous artisan. Visitors can view replicas of his main works, household items belonging to his family, and photographs highlighting key milestones in his artistic life. The space is managed by one of his sons, Severino Vitalino, who, like his father, earns a living through clay craftsmanship. The museum also offers insights into the stages of craft production. Also in the same neighborhood, the Mestre Galdino Museum houses many of his original pieces and poems, along with photographs and texts detailing the personal life of this contemporary of Mestre Vitalino, known for his surrealist works.

=== Caruaru Fair ===
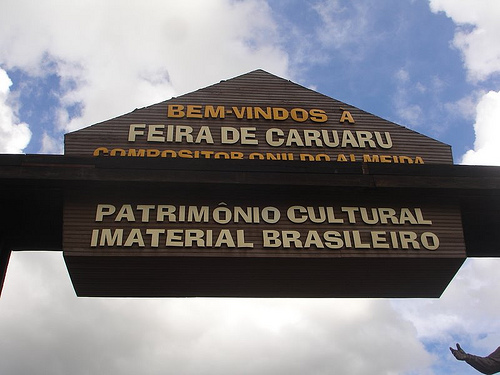
Entrance gate to the Caruaru Fair

Located in the Nossa Senhora das Dores neighborhood, in the economic heart of the city, the Caruaru Fair is one of the largest open-air markets of significant economic and cultural importance in Northeast Brazil. Operating for over 200 years, its origins are closely tied to the city's history. The site was a stopping point for cowboys driving cattle from the interior to the coast and for peddlers traveling in the opposite direction. The fair takes place on Wednesdays and Saturdays, with setup beginning the previous afternoon as merchants arrive with their goods. They use various forms of transportation, including donkeys, carts, old trucks, vans, bicycles, ox carts, and cars. Due to its diversity, the fair keeps the city bustling nearly every day of the week.

In 1992, the fair was relocated from Largo da Igreja da Conceição to Parque 18 de Maio, also in the city center. Thousands of colorful stalls stretch over two kilometers of city streets, offering a wide variety of products, particularly popular crafts such as straw, leather, and fabric hats, baskets, clay and ceramic objects, traditional toys, and bird cages. The fair includes sections for fruits, vegetables, grains, medicinal herbs, and meats, as well as clothing, shoes, bags, kitchen utensils, furniture, animals, hardware, radios, and imported electronics. A unique "swap" section allows bartering of items such as bicycles, radios, watches, clothes, wallets, and musical instruments. Musicians play the accordion and guitar, while vendors of cordel literature advertise through loudspeakers.

The fair also features musical groups and fife bands. Blending commerce, festivity, and popular art, anonymous artists showcase Northeastern culture. It is a meeting point for artists, poets, bohemians, and tourists from Brazil and abroad who join the local population and crowd the stalls, contributing significantly to the city's economy. Luiz Gonzaga's rendition of Onildo Almeida's song Feira de Caruaru is a well-known representation of the essence of the Caruaru Fair. In 2006, the fair was designated a Brazilian Intangible Cultural Heritage by the National Institute of Historic and Artistic Heritage.

=== São João ===
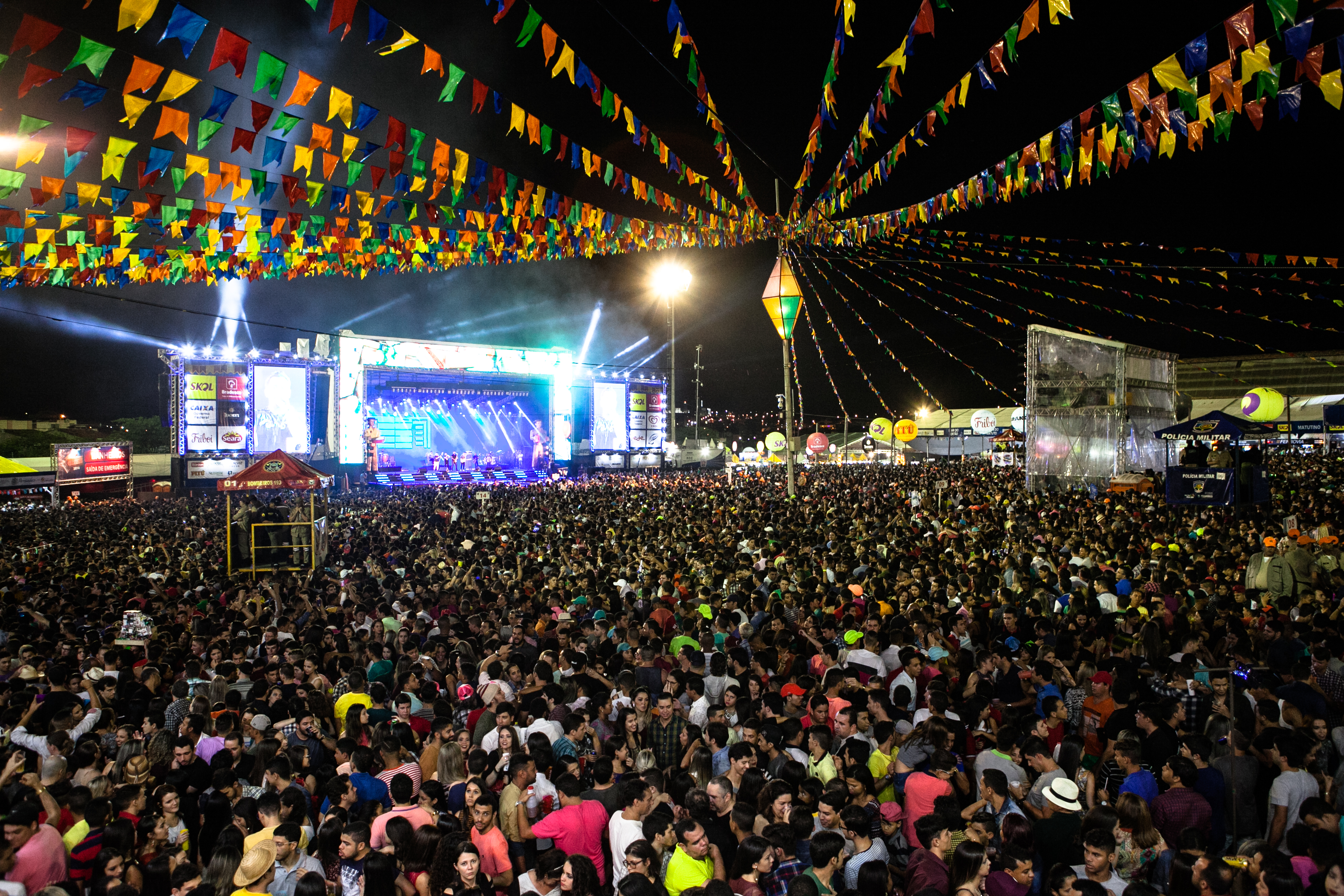
The São João de Caruaru is the world's largest open-air regional festival, according to Guinness.

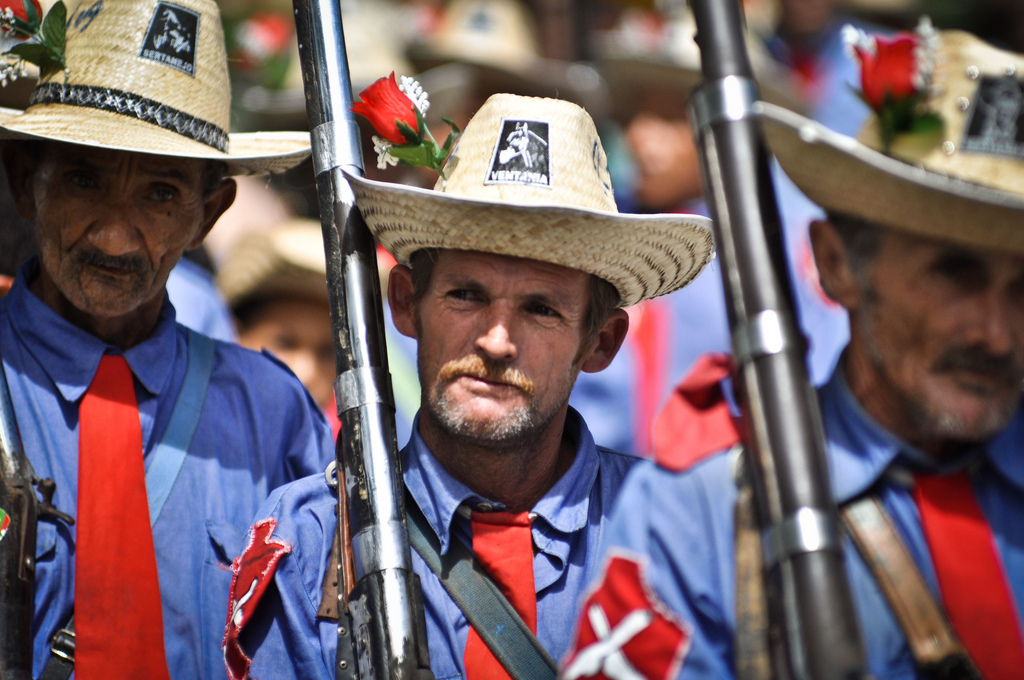
Bacamarteiros, a popular traditional festival in Caruaru

Caruaru hosts the world's largest Festa Junina, attracting over 1.5 million visitors. Due to its massive attendance, it holds the Guinness World Records title as the largest open-air regional country festival. This title should not be confused with the theme of the São João festival in Campina Grande, known as "The Greatest São João in the World," though the official title belongs to Caruaru.

Since the mid-19th century, Caruaru's São João festivals have drawn visitors from surrounding areas and even Recife. Initially organized on private rural estates, they featured bonfires, balloons, fireworks, quadrilha dances, and stalls offering curau, pamonha, corn, and lively entertainment. In the 1950s, a fair featuring a wide variety of fireworks typical of Northeast Brazil was a popular attraction for people of all ages. Fireworks are now a staple of the festivities. They were introduced to Brazil by Portuguese and Spanish immigrants who had learned about them from Chinese and Arab traders.

With a long tradition of São João celebrations, the festival has been held since 1994 at the Luiz Gonzaga Events Courtyard, a 41,500 m^{2} complex housing the Caruaru Culture Foundation, the Museu do Barro and Museu do Forró, an exhibition pavilion, the Municipal Tourism Secretariat, a stage for performances, and the Vila do Forró, a replica of a typical rural village with a small church, town hall, grocery store, bank, and post office, all built in masonry.

The festivities attract over 1.5 million tourists. Visitors can see performances by bacamarteiros and fife bands, as well as shows by artists such as Alceu Valença, Dominguinhos, Elba Ramalho, Gilberto Gil, Zé Ramalho, and Nando Cordel. They can also sample regional cuisine and dance to traditional Northeastern forró pé-de-serra music.

Food and drinks are also major attractions and are offered on designated days. Options include hot chocolate, quentão, popcorn, pamonha, couscous, corn cake, pé de moleque, rice pudding, canjica, cassava cake, xarém, and stew. On June 28, a massive bonfire made of eco-friendly wood is lit in front of the Convent Church.

Inspired by traditional quadrilhas, the Drilhas, carnival-like blocks similar to Bahia's electric trios, emerged in Caruaru's São João in 1989. To preserve the festival's traditions, these trios perform only in the afternoon on Agamenon Magalhães Avenue. The oldest and most traditional are the Gaydrilha, featuring men dressed as rural characters, and the Sapadrilha, with women dressed as men, both established in 1989. Other drilhas include Piradrilha, Diversãodrilha, Turisdrilha, Trokadrilha, Brinkadrilha, and Nova Drilha. In 2009, the São João de Caruaru honored the centennial of Mestre Vitalino, the city's famous ceramist, and was registered as Pernambuco's Intangible Heritage by the Legislative Assembly of Pernambuco.

== Sports ==
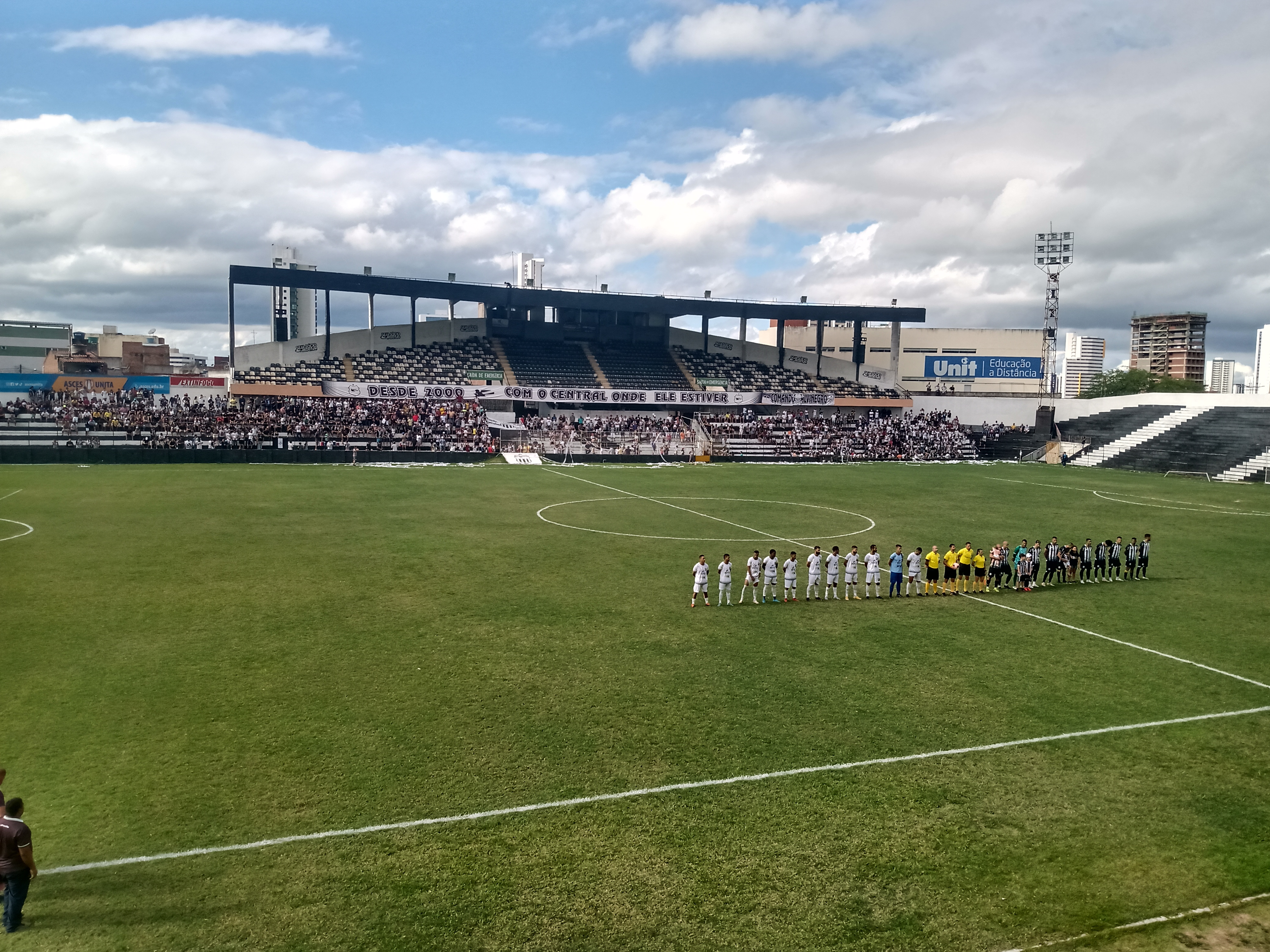
View of Lacerdão Stadium during a match between Central and Vitória das Tabocas in November 2022

Each year, TV Asa Branca and partners organize the Copa TV Asa Branca de Futsal. The SESC gymnasium, near the Sulanca Fair courtyard, hosts matches involving futsal teams from major cities in the Forest Zone, Agreste, and Sertão regions, such as Palmares, Catende, Bezerros, Santa Cruz do Capibaribe, Belo Jardim, Garanhuns, Lajedo, Arcoverde, and Serra Talhada.

Another major sports venue in Caruaru is the Ayrton Senna International Racetrack, which hosts an annual stage of the Fórmula Truck and various other competitions. It is Pernambuco's main racetrack, inaugurated on December 13, 1992, with a 3,180-meter track and widths ranging from nine to sixteen meters.

== Holidays ==
According to the Municipal Official Gazette, Caruaru observes five municipal holidays in 2025: Good Friday, on 18 April; the anniversary of the municipality's political emancipation, on 18 May; Saint John's Day, on 24 June; Saint Peter's Day, on 29 June; and the day of Our Lady of Sorrows, the municipal patron saint, on 15 September. In addition to these holidays, there are optional holidays during Carnival week, from 3 March to 5 March (the latter until 12 PM), and on Civil Servants' Day, 28 October.

== See also ==
- Caruaru Airport
- Diocese of Caruaru
- List of municipalities in Pernambuco
- Category:People from Caruaru
