= Cau =

Cau or CAU may refer to:

== Mythology ==
- Cau (bull), a legendary bull in Meitei mythology

== People ==
- Jean Cau (rower) (1874–1921), French Olympic rower
- Jean Cau (writer) (1925–1993), French writer and journalist
- Jean-Michel Cau, French footballer
- Mario Cau, Brazilian graphic novelist and illustrator

== Universities ==
- Carlos Albizu University, Florida, USA
- Central Agricultural University, India
- China Agricultural University, Beijing, China
- Kiel University, Germany
- Chung-Ang University, Seoul, South Korea
- Clark Atlanta University, Georgia, USA

== Transport ==
- CAU, the IATA code for Caruaru Airport, Pernambuco, Brazil
- CAU, the National Rail code for Causeland railway station, Cornwall, UK

== Sport ==
- CAU Rugby Valencia, a rugby club in eastern Spain
- Confederación Atlética del Uruguay, the Uruguayan Athletics Confederation
- Cricket Association of Uttarakhand, the governing body for cricket in Uttarakhand, India

== Other ==
- CUA, a codon for the amino acid histidine
- Cầu River in northern Vietnam
- CAU/LAM — "Controlled Access Unit/Lobe Attachment Module", a type of Token Ring connection
