= Wilson Surubim =

Brazilian footballer

Personal information
- Full name: Edwilson de Lima Florêncio
- Date of birth: 28 March 1980 (age 46)
- Place of birth: Toritama, PE, Brazil
- Height: 1.80 m (5 ft 11 in)
- Position: Midfielder

Team information
- Current team: Ypiranga

Senior career*
Years	Team	Apps	(Gls)
2001	Guarani	13	(1)
2003	Náutico	5	(0)
2004	Paysandu	2	(0)
2004	Sport	2	(0)
2005	Ypiranga-PE		
2006	Santa Cruz	19	(1)
2008	Confiança		
2009–2010	Ypiranga		
2009	→ Campinense (loan)		
2011	Central		
2011	Belo Jardim		
2011	Salgueiro	2	(0)
2012–	Ypiranga-PE		
- * Club domestic league appearances and goals as of 5 January 2009

Edwilson de Lima Florêncio (born 28 March 1980 in Toritama), also known as Wilson Surubim, is a Brazilian footballer who currently plays as a midfielder for Sociedade Esportiva Ypiranga Futebol Clube.

The Brazilian Football Confederation revealed that Wilson Surubim had tested positive for doping (Prednisolone) while playing for Confiança in the Campeonato Brasileiro Série C on 8 October 2008.
