= Eliseu Martins =

Coordinates: 8°13′S 43°42′W

- Municipality
- Country: Brazil
- Region: Nordeste
- State: Piauí
- Mesoregion: Sudoeste Piauiense

Population (2020)
  - Total: 4,930
- Time zone: UTC−3 (BRT)

Eliseu Martins is a municipality in the state of Piauí in the Northeast region of Brazil.

== See also ==
- List of municipalities in Piauí
