= Jean-Michel Cau =

French footballer (born 1980)

Personal information
- Full name: Jean-Michel Cau
- Date of birth: 27 October 1980 (age 46)
- Place of birth: Ajaccio, France
- Height: 1.90 m (6 ft 3 in)
- Position: Forward

Youth career
- –: Gazélec Ajaccio

Senior career*
Years	Team	Apps	(Gls)
199?–1999	Istres		
1999–2001	Gazélec Ajaccio	9	(0)
2001	Darlington	1	(0)
2001–2003	Porto Vecchio		
2003–2007	Gazélec Ajaccio		
- * Club domestic league appearances and goals

Jean-Michel Cau (born 27 October 1980) is a French former footballer who played as a forward. He played in the lower divisions of French football and played in the Football League for Darlington.

Cau was born in Ajaccio, Corsica, and began his career as a youngster with his hometown club, Gazélec Ajaccio. He moved to mainland France with Istres before returning to Gazélec in 1999, for whom he made nine appearances in the Championnat National over two seasons. In March 2001, he signed for English Football League club Darlington. He made just one appearance, as a substitute. He was introduced during the second half of a 1–1 draw with Leyton Orient in the Third Division on 30 March 2001, and according to the News of the World's match report, "his only contribution was to get booked for a 62nd-minute foul". He returned to Corsica with Porto Vecchio before rejoining Gazélec Ajaccio in 2003.
