= Caruaru Airport =

Airport in Pernambuco, Brazil

Oscar Laranjeira Airport Aeroporto Oscar Laranjeira
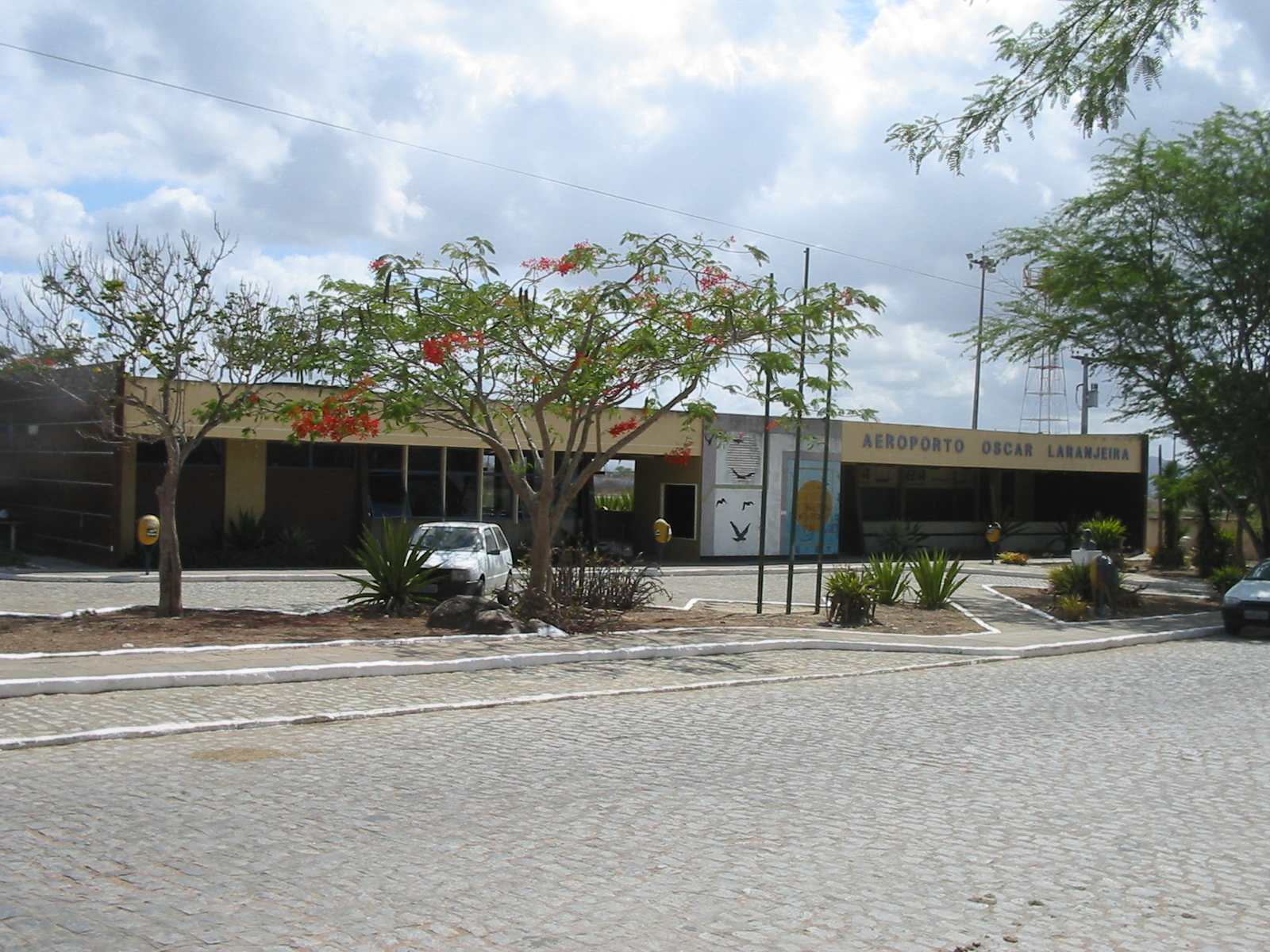
- IATA: CAU; ICAO: SNRU; LID: PE0004

Summary
- Airport type: Public
- Operator: Infracea (?–2022); Dix (2022–present)
- Serves: Caruaru
- Time zone: BRT (UTC−03:00)
- Elevation AMSL: 576 m (1,890 ft)
- Coordinates: 08°17′04″S 036°00′39″W

Map
- Location in Brazil

Runways
Direction	Length		Surface
Direction	m	ft	Surface
13/31	1,800	5,905	Asphalt
- Sources: ANAC, DECEA

Oscar Laranjeira Airport (IATA: CAU, ICAO: SNRU) is the airport serving Caruaru, Brazil.

It is operated by Dix Empreendimentos.

== History ==
The airport was commissioned in 1985 but remained closed from 2003 to 2006 due to repair works on the apron: twice, in 2000 and 2002, the apron collapsed under the weight of aircraft.

Previously operated by Infracea, on May 16, 2022 the concessionary Dix Empreendimentos started operating the facility.

== Airlines and destinations ==
Airlines	Destinations
Azul Conecta	Recife

== Access ==
The airport is located 5 km (3 mi) from downtown Caruaru.

== See also ==
- List of airports in Brazil
