= Toritama =

Municipality of Pernambuco, Brazil

- Municipality
- The Municipality of Toritama
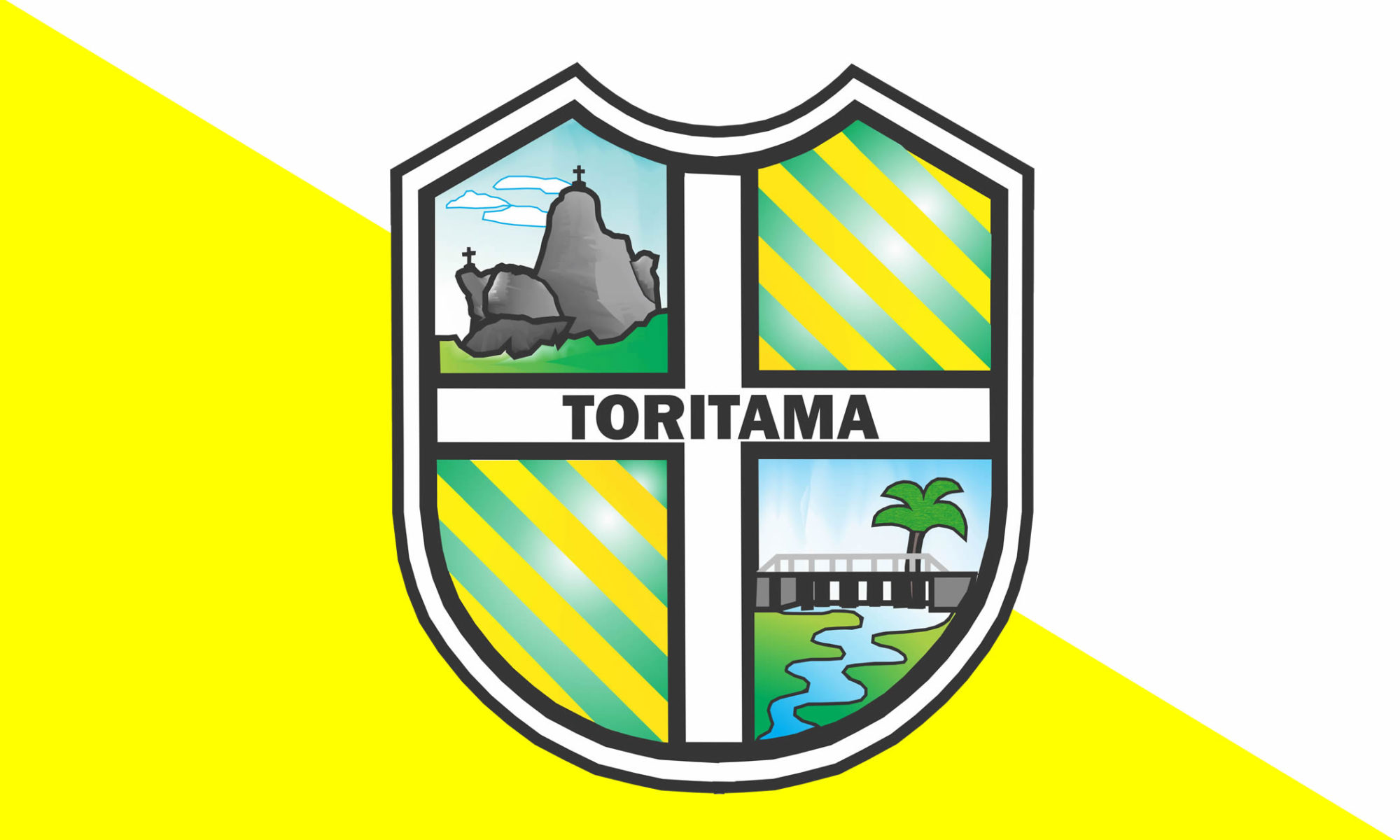
- Flag
- Nickname: "Capital do Jeans" (Capital of Jeans )
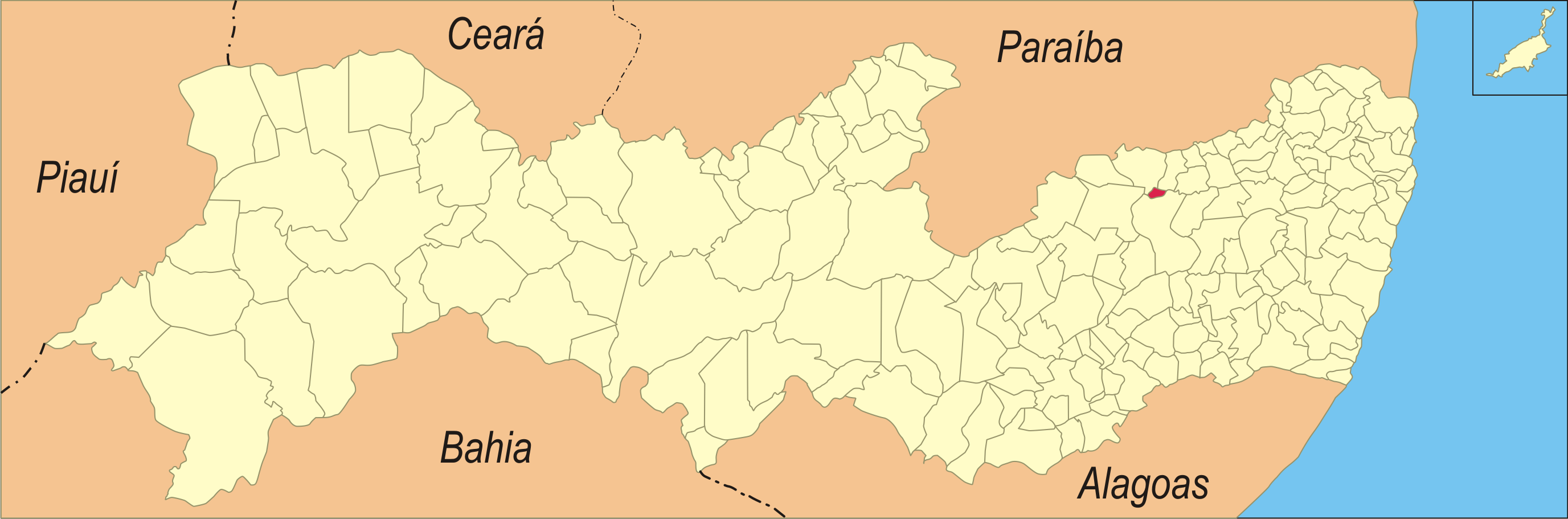
- Location of Toritama in the State of Pernambuco
- Coordinates: 07°58′56″S 36°03′03″W
- Country: Brazil
- Region: Northeast
- State: Pernambuco
- Founded: December 29, 1953

Government
  - Mayor: Edilson Tavares da Silva (PMDB)

Area
  - Total: 30.930 km^{2} (11.942 sq mi)
- Elevation: 349 m (1,145 ft)

Population (2022 Census)
  - Total: 41,137
  - Estimate (2025): 43,921
  - Density: 1,330.0/km^{2} (3,444.7/sq mi)
- Time zone: UTC−3 (BRT)
- HDI (2010): 0.618 – medium

Toritama (Central northeastern portuguese pronunciation: [toɾiˈtɐ̃mɐ]) is a municipality in the Brazilian state of Pernambuco, in the mesoregion of Agreste Pernambucano. It is located at an altitude of 349 m, and it is 153 km west of the capital Recife. In 2020 it has an estimated population of 46,164 and an area of 25.7 km^{2}, which makes it the smallest municipality of Pernambuco, if Fernando de Noronha is not taken into account. Toritama is best knowns for its production and sale of textiles, in particular jeans.

== History ==
In the middle of the 19th century, Toritama was a cattle farm on the left bank of the Capibaribe River. The name Toritama comes from the indigenous words tori ("stone") and tama ("region"), in allusion to the 30-m tall stones that give the impression of a tower on the right bank of the Capibaribe. The area became a municipality on December 29, 1953; before that it consisted of the districts of Vertentes and Taquaritinga do Norte. The municipality had as its first provisional administrators Joaquim Aurélio Correia de Araújo and Antônio Manoel da Silva. The first elected mayor was José Jota de Araújo, three and a half years after the municipality's creation.

== Tourism ==
Toritama has also made an effort to increase its tourism potential. Outside of the market square, 70 percent of the vehicles have license plates from another city in Brazil.

== Economy ==
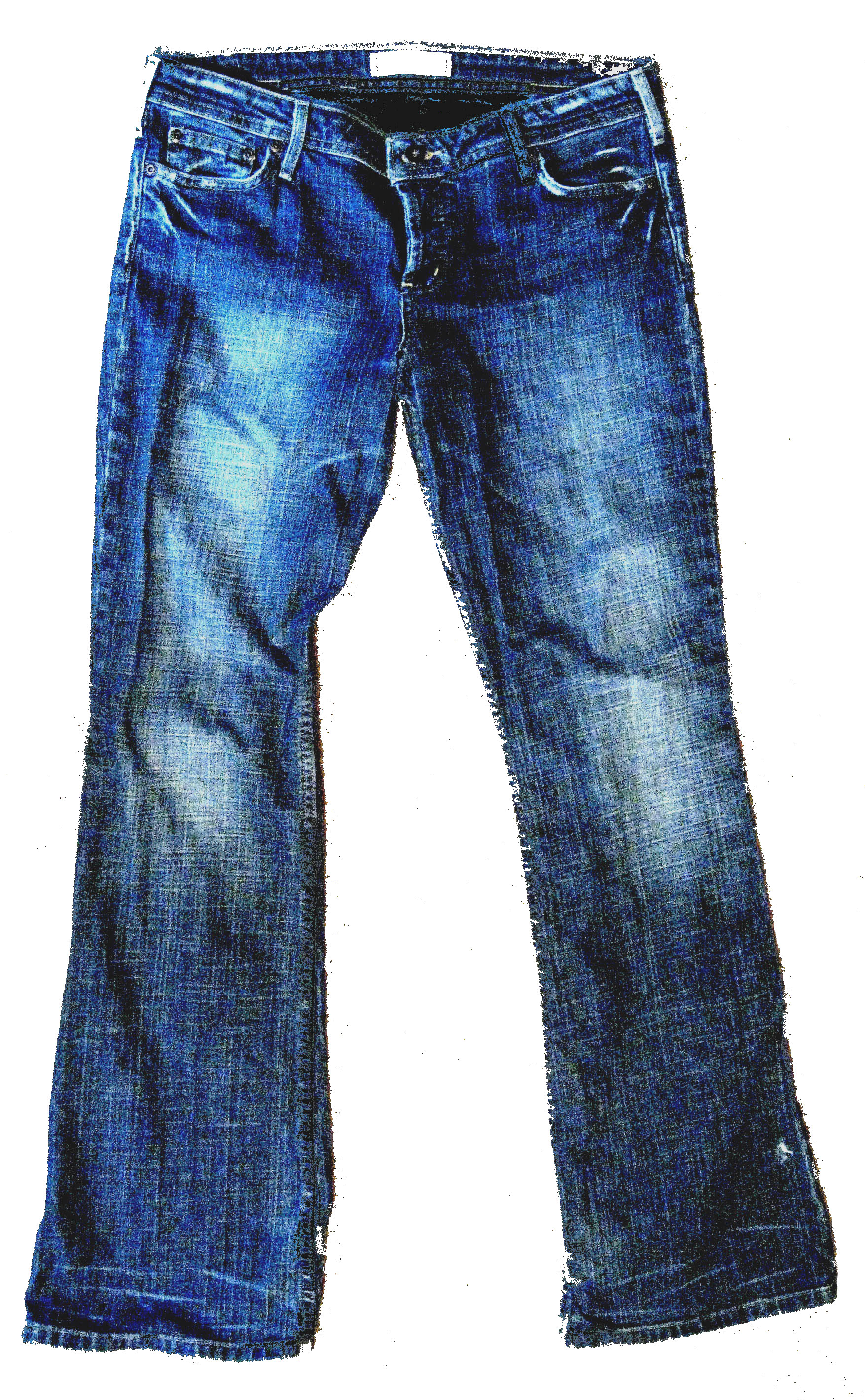
Toritama produces 15% of the Brazilian jeans

The city's location on a seasonal river which doesn't provide sufficient water for irrigation compelled the population to make a living in industrial activities. The municipality became a significant center of footwear manufacture in the 1970s. However, thereafter the industry declined due to strong competition from major footwear producers, which resulted in the factories producing leather shoes entering a period of decline and rapidly going bankrupt. The population then moved into the manufacture of jeans. The industry grew rapidly, and now 15 percent of the jeans produced in Brazil are made in Toritama. Attracted by their quality and low price, consumers from all over Brazil come to Toritama to buy and resell the jeans.

The Parque das Feiras (market square) is where the city's commerce is concentrated and the majority of the town's clothing stores are located. Located on the BR 104, it has an area of nine hectares divided into stalls, plus restaurants and a parking lot with space for 2000 vehicles. It was opened in September 2001, with 875 stalls of three square meters each, but the endeavor was so successful that it was subsequently enlarged by 1518 stalls.

=== Economic Indicators ===
Population	GDP x(1000 R$).	GDP pc (R$)	PE
33.206	122.928	4.111	0.20%

Economy by Sector 2006

Primary sector	Secondary sector	Service sector
0.58%	17.22%	82.20%

=== Health Indicators ===
HDI (2010)	Hospitals (2007)	Hospitals beds (2007)	Children's Mortality every 1000 (2005)
0.618	1	31	21

== See also ==
- List of municipalities in Pernambuco
