= Riachão =

Riachão may refer to:

== Places in Brazil ==
- Riachão (São Bento) in Paraíba
- Riachão, Maranhão
- Riachão, Paraíba
- Riachão do Bacamarte in Paraíba
- Riachão do Dantas in Sergipe
- Riachão do Jacuípe in Bahia
- Riachão das Neves in Bahia
- Riachão do Poço in Paraíba
- Sucupira do Riachão in Maranhão

== People ==
- Riachão (singer), Brazilian composer and singer

== See also ==
- Riacho (disambiguation)
