= Riacho =

Riacho may refer to the following places in Brazil:

- Dois Riachos, Alagoas
- Riacho das Almas, Pernambuco
- Riacho dos Cavalos, Paraíba
- Riacho da Cruz, Rio Grande do Norte
- Riacho Frio, Piauí
- Riacho dos Machados, Minas Gerais
- Riacho de Santana, Bahia
- Riacho de Santana, Rio Grande do Norte
- Riacho de Santo Antônio, Paraíba
- Santana do Riacho, Minas Gerais

== See also ==
- Riachão (disambiguation)
