= Meiry Lanunce =

Brazilian journalist and television presenter

- Born: December 13, 1972 (age 52); Taquaritinga do Norte, Pernambuco, Brazil
- Occupations: television presenter; journalist

Meiry Lanunce (13 December 1972), is a Brazilian journalist and television presenter. She began her journalistic career at TV Globo Nordeste in 2000. Currently presents Balanço Geral Pernambuco on TV Guararapes.

== Biography and career ==
Born in Taquaritinga do Norte, in the Agreste region of Pernambuco, in 1972, Meiry Lanunce began her career on TV São Francisco (1994). She joined Globo Nordeste in 2000 as a reporter. In 2006, she took over Bom Dia Pernambuco, staying in charge until 2017. Soon after, she started to present NE2 where she won one of the largest audiences on TV Globo. However, in 2020, after some changes in local journalism on TV Globo, Meiry returned to the streets as a reporter, staying on the air until the end of her contract. Two years later he returned to Pernambuco. She participated in the Diplomatic Mission in the US at the invitation of the US Embassy in the International Visitors Program (Specific field of action was in the Programs to Combat Domestic Violence). Among awards and nominations: Cristina Tavares Journalism Award in 2005 and the Medal of Journalistic Merit of Pernambuco Minister Marcos Freire (award granted by the Legislative Assembly in 2015.) She was hired by Rede Record in 2021 after resigning from TV Globo. In 2015, she won the award for best journalist from Rede Globo and the title given to Pernambuco citizens award by the Government of the State of Pernambuco.

== Works ==
- TV São Francisco reporter from 1994 to 1996
- Globo Nordeste reporter from 1998 to 2006
- Presenter of Bom Dia Pernambuco (Globo Nordeste) from 2006 to 2017
- Occasional presenter of NETV (Globo Nordeste) from 2013 to 2017
- Presenter of NE Second Edition (Globo Nordeste) from 2017 to 2020
- Globo Nordeste reporter from 2020 to 2022
- Presenter of Jornal Guararapes since 2022
- Occasional presenter of Jornal da Record since 2022

In 2015, she won the award for best journalist from Rede Globo and the title given to Pernambuco citizens award by the Government of the State of Pernambuco.
