= Maria Cristina Cavalcanti de Albuquerque =

Brazilian novelist, historian and psychiatrist

- Born: February 1943 (age 82); Vertentes
- Occupation: Historian, psychiatrist, educator
- Education: Federal University of Pernambuco; Michigan State University

Maria Cristina Cavalcanti de Albuquerque (born February 1943, in Vertentes) is a Brazilian novelist, historian and psychiatrist.

== Biography ==
Daughter of the physician and politician Emidio Cavalcanti de Albuquerque and Maria do Carmo Santana Cavalcanti. From a young age had awakened her interest in literature and historiography to hear the stories that their grandparents and uncles told her about the genealogy of the Albuquerque Family. She is descended from Portuguese nobleman Jerônimo de Albuquerque.

Cristina de Albuquerque graduated in Medicine at the Federal University of Pernambuco (UFPE) and attended graduate in Psychiatry at Michigan State University in the United States. She was a university professor in the Department of Neuropsychiatry of UFPE and president of the Archaeological, History and Geography Institute of Pernambuco.

== Literature ==
Assigns the passion for reading classic works of the universal literature of her maturity as a writer over the years. Her favorite writers are, in tragedy, the Greek Euripides; Shakespeare in tragicomedy; the great Russian novelists Tolstoy and Dostoevsky. In the tale, tends to Chekhov. See in Marcel Proust the revolution of the concept of romance. In poetry she is a great admirer of Rimbaud. In Brazilian literature she appreciates the dapper style of Machado de Assis and the creations of João Cabral de Mello Neto and Gerardo Mello Mourao. Her favorite classic is "In Search of Lost Time" by Proust. As a bedside book she has the Jerusalem Bible. Believes that her best book is "Luz do Abismo", published in 1996.

In 2012, held the lecture "Matias, o magro" in the auditorium of the Museum of Pernambuco State, under the auspices of the Association of Friends of Museum, trying on the life and achievements of Count of Alegrete Matias de Albuquerque, a Portuguese nobleman who was governor of the Captaincy of Pernambuco and one of the Governors-General of Brazil.

In 2014 follows with the final preparations for the publication of her new book "Múltiplas Verdades", which deals with the interaction of the reader-writer, the "womb" of literary creation, according to the author. Started the documentary searches for structuring other book of historical fiction, "O Seminário" on the traditional and prestigious Seminary of Olinda, founded in 1801, and its leading role in Pernambuco revolutionary cycle.

== Works ==
- O Magnificat: memórias diacrônicas de dona Isabel Cavalcanti (1990)
- Luz do Abismo (1996)
- Príncipe e Corsário (2005)
- Memórias de Isabel Cavalcanti (2006)
- Olhos Negros (2010)
- Matias: romance (2012)
