= List of mayors of São Bento (Paraíba) =

This is the mayors list of São Bento, Paraíba, the Brazilian state of Paraiba.

Nº	Name	Party	Home of Mandate	End of Mandate	Observation
1	João Silveira Guimarães	National Democratic Union (Brazil)	30 November 1959	29 November 1963	Elected Mayor
2	Milton Lúcio da Silva	National Renewal Alliance	30 November 1963	30 November 1969	Elected Mayor
3	João Silveira Guimarães	National Renewal Alliance	31 November 1969	30 January 1973	Elected Mayor
4	Milton Lúcio da Silva	National Renewal Alliance	31 January 1973	30 January 1977	Elected Mayor
5	Pedro Eulâmpio da Silva	Brazilian Democratic Movement	31 January 1977	30 January 1983	Elected Mayor
6	Milton Lúcio da Silva Filho	Democratic Social Party	31 January 1983	31 December 1988	Elected Mayor
7	Ademar Pereira Diniz	Liberal Front Party (Brazil)	1 January 1989	31 December 1992	Elected Mayor
8	Milton Lúcio da Silva Filho	Liberal Front Party (Brazil)	1 January 1993	31 December 1996	Elected Mayor
9	Márcio Roberto da Silva	Brazilian Democratic Movement Party	1 January 1997	31 December 2000	Elected Mayor
9	Márcio Roberto da Silva	Brazilian Democratic Movement Party	1 January 2001	31 December 2004	Re-elected Mayor
10	Jaci Severino de Sousa, Galego Sousa	Brazilian Democratic Movement Party	1 January 2005	31 December 2008	Elected Mayor
10	Jaci Severino de Sousa, Galego Sousa	Brazilian Democratic Movement Party	1 January 2009	31 December 2012	Re-elected Mayor
11	Gemilton Souza da Silva	Brazilian Socialist Party	1 January 2013	Present	Elected Mayor
