= Surubim =

Municipality of Pernambuco, Brazil

- Municipality
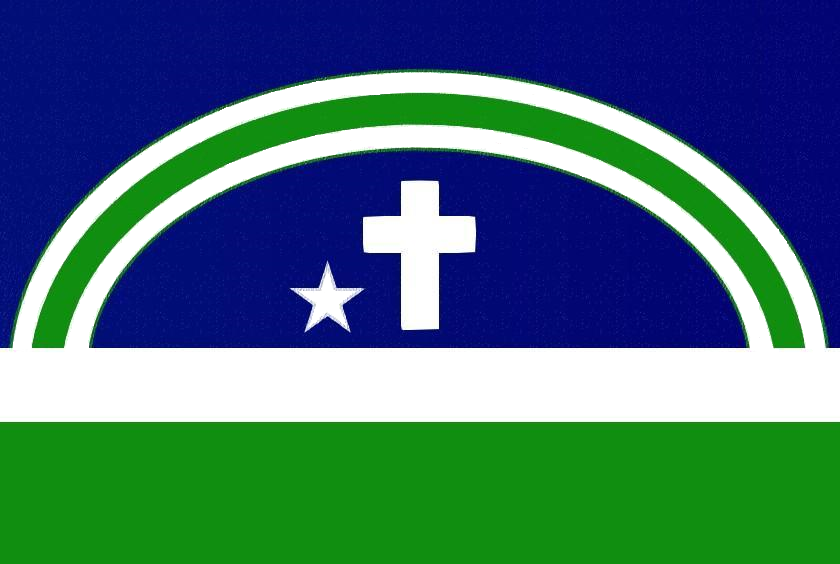
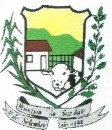
- Flag Coat of arms

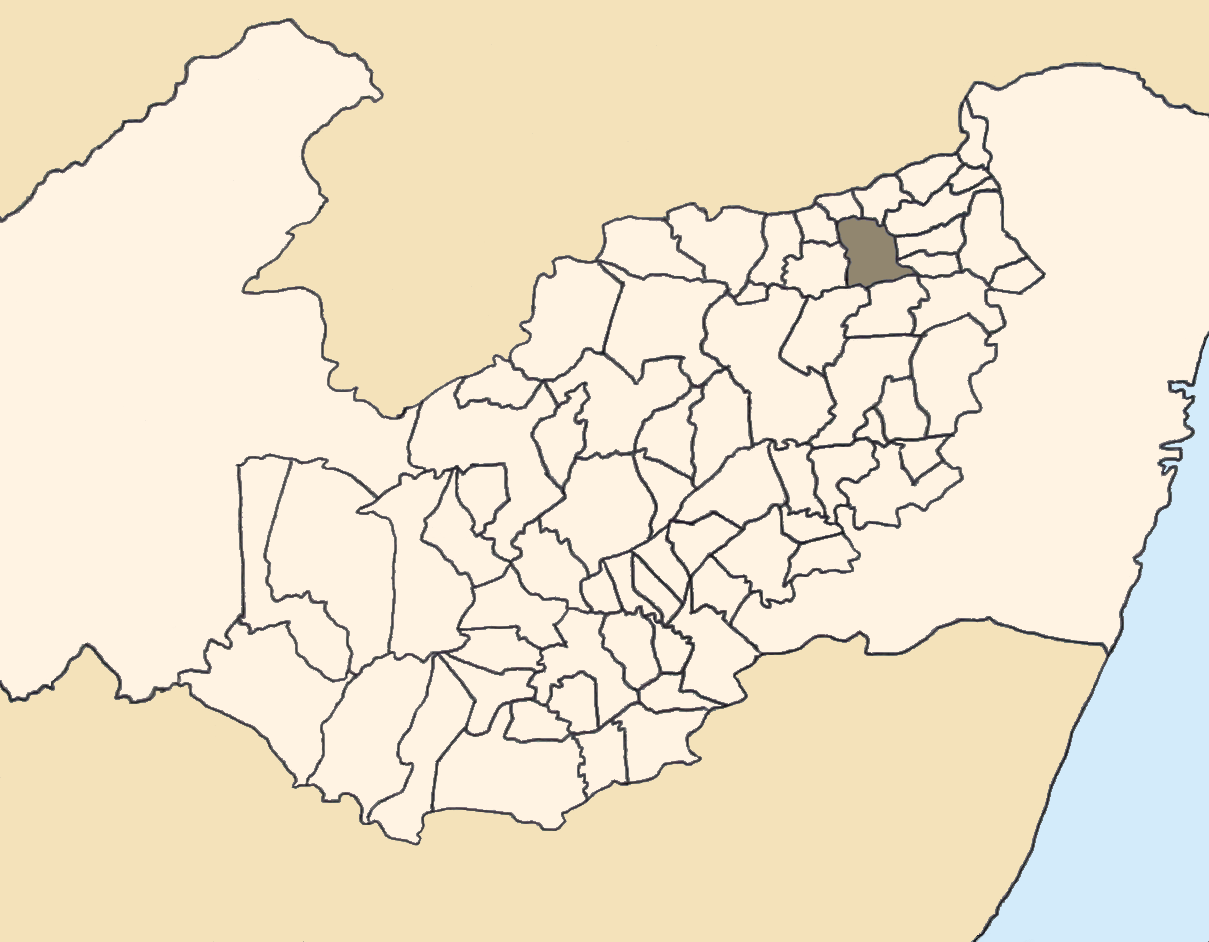
- Municipal location

- Location in Brazil
- Coordinates: 7°50′S 35°45′W
- Country: Brazil
- Region: Northeast
- State: Pernambuco
- Established: April 27, 1893

Area
  - Total: 97.63 sq mi (252.85 km^{2})
- Elevation: 1,293 ft (394 m)

Population (2022 Census)
  - Total: 64,120
  - Estimate (2025): 67,821
  - Density: 599.4/sq mi (231.42/km^{2})
- Time zone: UTC−3 (BRT)

Surubim (Central northeastern portuguese pronunciation: [suɾuˈbĩ]) is a city in the state of Pernambuco, Brazil. It is the birthplace of Chacrinha, a famous Brazilian comedian and entertainer who died in 1988.

== Geography ==
- State - Pernambuco
- Region - Agreste of Pernambuco
- Boundaries - Vertentes do Lério and Casinhas (N); Riacho das Almas and Cumaru (S); Bom Jardim, Salgadinho and João Alfredo (E); Santa Maria do Cambucá and Frei Miguelinho (W)
- Area - 252.85 km^{2}
- Elevation - 394 m
- Hydrography - Capibaribe river
- Vegetation - Caatinga Hiperxerófila
- Climate - semi-arid, hot and dry
- Annual average temperature - 23.7 c
- Distance to Recife - 134 km

=== Climate ===
Climate data for Surubim (1991–2020)
Month	Jan	Feb	Mar	Apr	May	Jun	Jul	Aug	Sep	Oct	Nov	Dec	Year
Mean daily maximum °C (°F)	31.9 (89.4)	31.9 (89.4)	31.6 (88.9)	30.8 (87.4)	29.2 (84.6)	27.3 (81.1)	26.5 (79.7)	27.2 (81.0)	29.0 (84.2)	30.8 (87.4)	31.8 (89.2)	32.2 (90.0)	30.0 (86.0)
Daily mean °C (°F)	25.3 (77.5)	25.6 (78.1)	25.6 (78.1)	25.2 (77.4)	24.1 (75.4)	22.7 (72.9)	21.9 (71.4)	22.0 (71.6)	22.9 (73.2)	24.1 (75.4)	24.9 (76.8)	25.3 (77.5)	24.1 (75.4)
Mean daily minimum °C (°F)	21.1 (70.0)	21.6 (70.9)	21.7 (71.1)	21.4 (70.5)	20.6 (69.1)	19.5 (67.1)	18.7 (65.7)	18.3 (64.9)	18.9 (66.0)	19.8 (67.6)	20.5 (68.9)	20.9 (69.6)	20.3 (68.5)
Average precipitation mm (inches)	37.9 (1.49)	41.6 (1.64)	62.8 (2.47)	68.7 (2.70)	76.5 (3.01)	99.1 (3.90)	84.3 (3.32)	47.8 (1.88)	23.1 (0.91)	8.8 (0.35)	10.6 (0.42)	19.1 (0.75)	580.3 (22.85)
Average precipitation days (≥ 1.0 mm)	4.2	5.1	7.2	7.9	10.4	13.0	13.7	10.0	4.9	2.4	2.0	2.8	83.6
Average relative humidity (%)	75.2	75.0	74.3	76.8	79.7	82.5	83.1	80.0	75.4	71.0	69.4	69.8	76.0
Average dew point °C (°F)	20.3 (68.5)	20.6 (69.1)	21.0 (69.8)	21.1 (70.0)	20.8 (69.4)	20.0 (68.0)	19.3 (66.7)	18.9 (66.0)	18.8 (65.8)	18.9 (66.0)	19.2 (66.6)	19.8 (67.6)	19.9 (67.8)
Mean monthly sunshine hours	244.7	230.5	246.7	222.0	206.9	175.2	180.1	213.3	241.6	269.5	271.0	263.9	2,765.4
Source: NOAA

== Economy ==
The main economic activities in Surubim are based in industry, commerce and agribusiness, especially the raising of cattle, pigs, goats, sheep and chickens.

=== Economic indicators ===
Population	GDP x(1000 R$).	GDP pc (R$)	PE
56.795	205.142	3.804	0.342%

Economy by Sector 2006

Primary sector	Secondary sector	Service sector
2.82%	12.97%	84.21%

=== Health indicators ===
HDI (2000)	Hospitals (2007)	Hospitals beds (2007)	Children's mortality every 1000 (2005)
0.641	1	249	22.3

== See also ==
- List of municipalities in Pernambuco
