= Santa Maria do Cambucá =

City in Pernambuco, Brazil

- Municipality
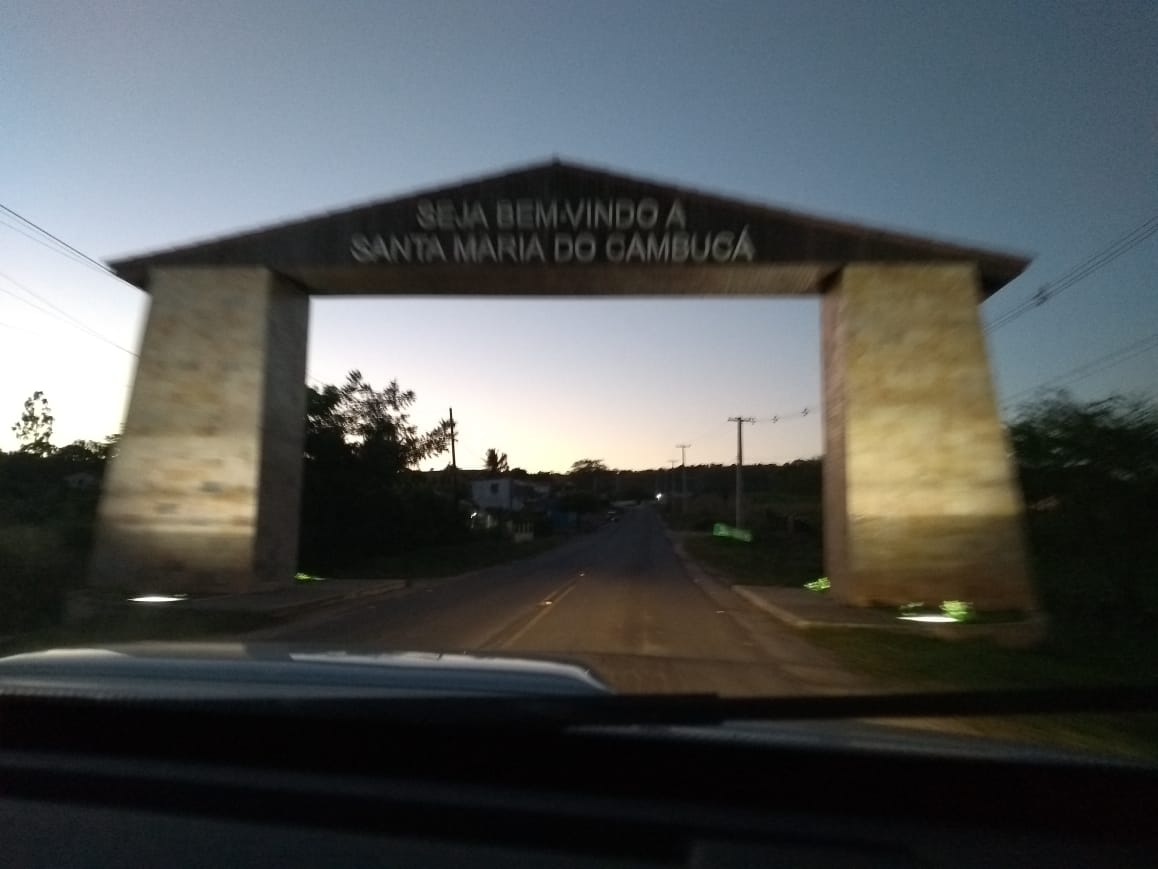
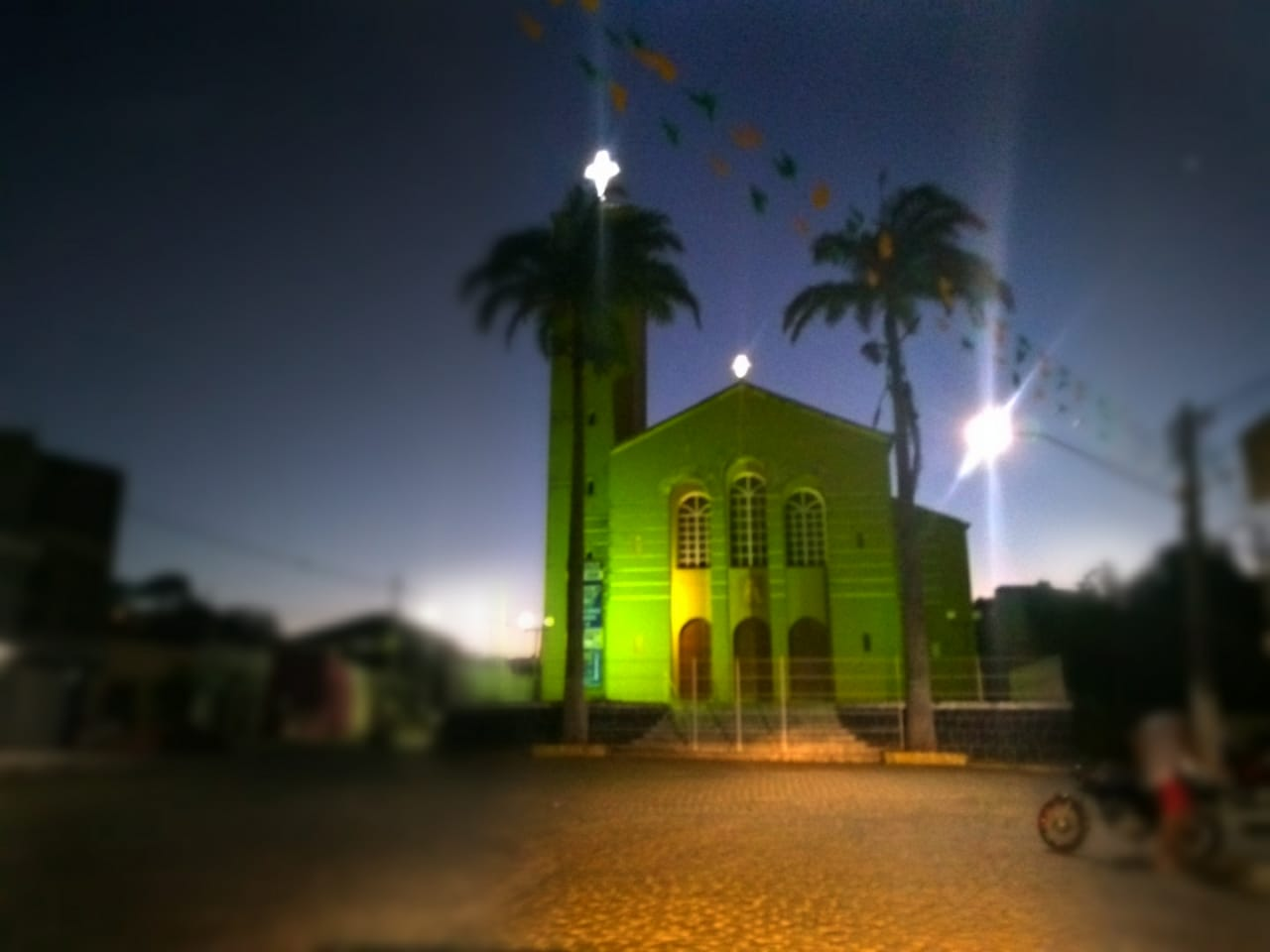
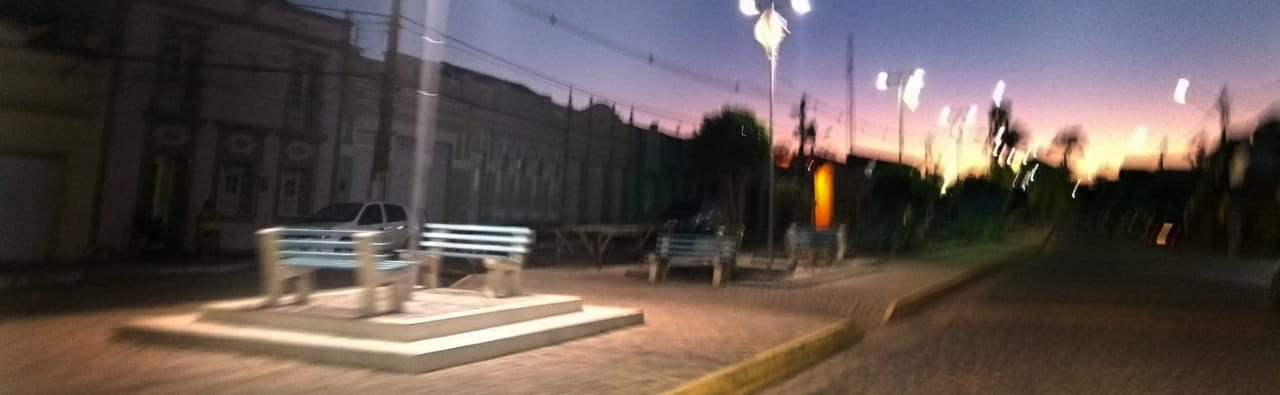
- Entrance to Santa Maria do Cambucá Our Lady of the Rosary parish church City square

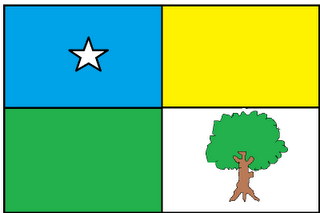
- Flag

- Location of Santa Maria do Cambucá in Pernambuco

- Location within Brazil Location within South America
- Coordinates: 7°50′24″S 35°54′7″W
- Country: Brazil
- Region: Northeast
- State: Pernambuco
- Founded: 25 July 1895

Government
  - Mayor: Alex Robevan de Lima (PV) (2025-2028)
  - Vice Mayor: Jaco João de Souza (PODE) (2025-2028)

Area
  - Total: 92.148 km^{2} (35.579 sq mi)
- Elevation: 520 m (1,710 ft)

Population (2022 Census)
  - Total: 14,013
  - Estimate (2025): 14,586
  - Density: 152.07/km^{2} (393.9/sq mi)
- Demonym: Santa-mariense (Brazilian Portuguese)
- Time zone: UTC-03:00 (Brasília Time)
- Postal code: 55765-000, 55767-000
- HDI (2010): 0.548 – low
- Website: santamariadocambuca.pe.gov.br

Santa Maria do Cambucá (Central northeastern portuguese pronunciation: [ˈsɐ̃ta maˈɾiɐ ˈdu kɐ̃buˈka]) is a city in Pernambuco, Brazil.

== Geography ==
- State - Pernambuco
- Region - Agreste Pernambucano
- Boundaries - Paraíba (N); Frei Miguelinho (S); Surubim and Vertentes do Lério (E); Vertentes (W)
- Area - 92.14 km^{2}
- Elevation - 494 m
- Hydrography - Capibaribe river
- Vegetation - Subcaducifólia forest
- Climate - semi arid hot
- Annual average temperature - 23.0 c
- Distance to Recife - 153 km
- Population - 14,586 (2025)

== Economy ==
The main economic activities in Santa Maria do Cambucá are general industry, and agribusiness especially plantations of beans; and farming of cattle, sheep, goats and chickens.

=== Economic indicators ===
Population	GDP x(1000 R$).	GDP pc (R$)	PE
11.978	37.060	3.001	0.06%

Economy by Sector 2006

Primary sector	Secondary sector	Service sector
8.69%	9.17%	82.14%

=== Health indicators ===
HDI (2000)	Hospitals (2007)	Hospitals beds (2007)	Children's Mortality every 1000 (2005)
0.566	---	---	22.7

== See also ==
- List of municipalities in Pernambuco
