= Casinhas =

Municipality of Pernambuco, Brazil

- City
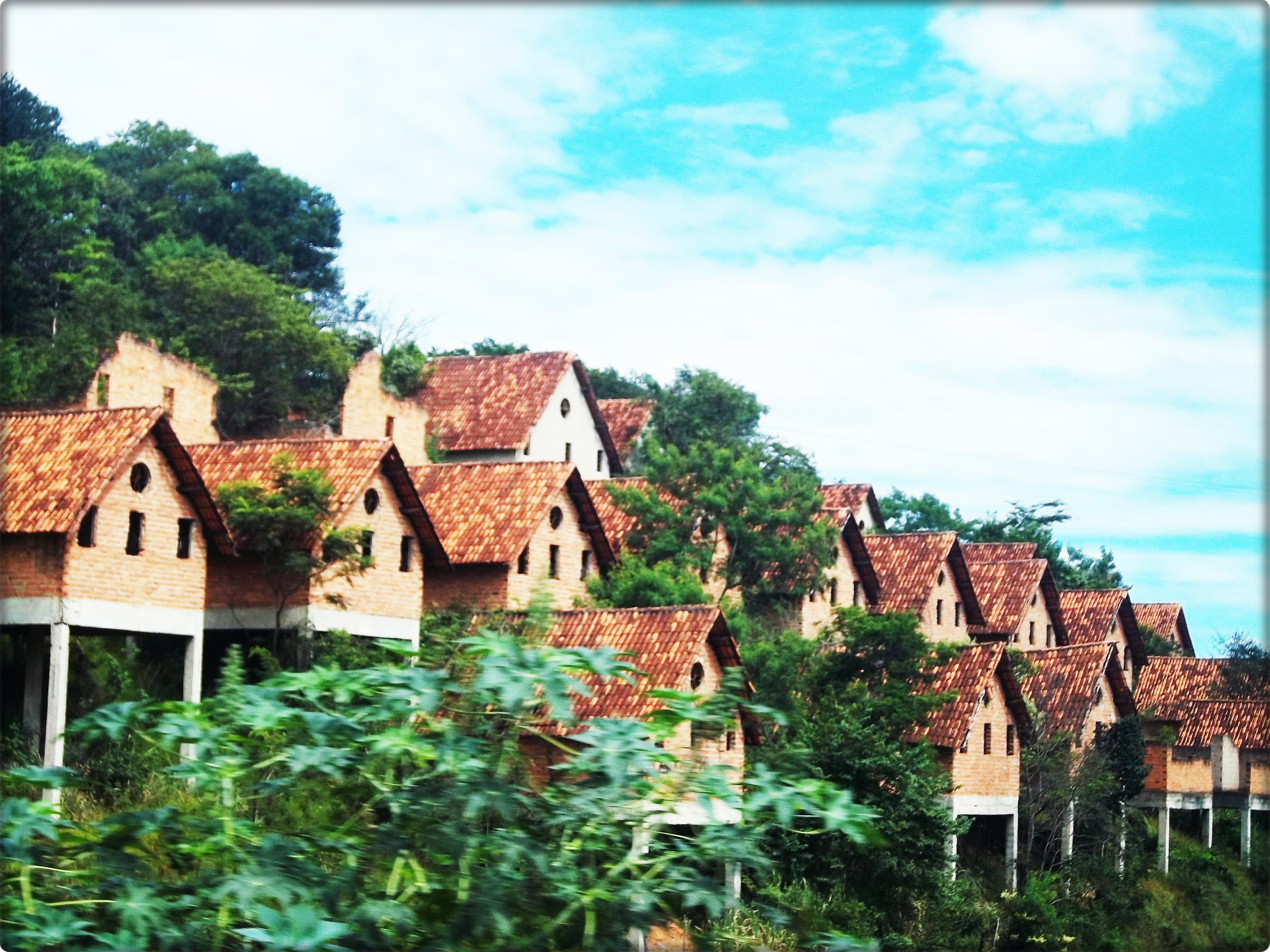

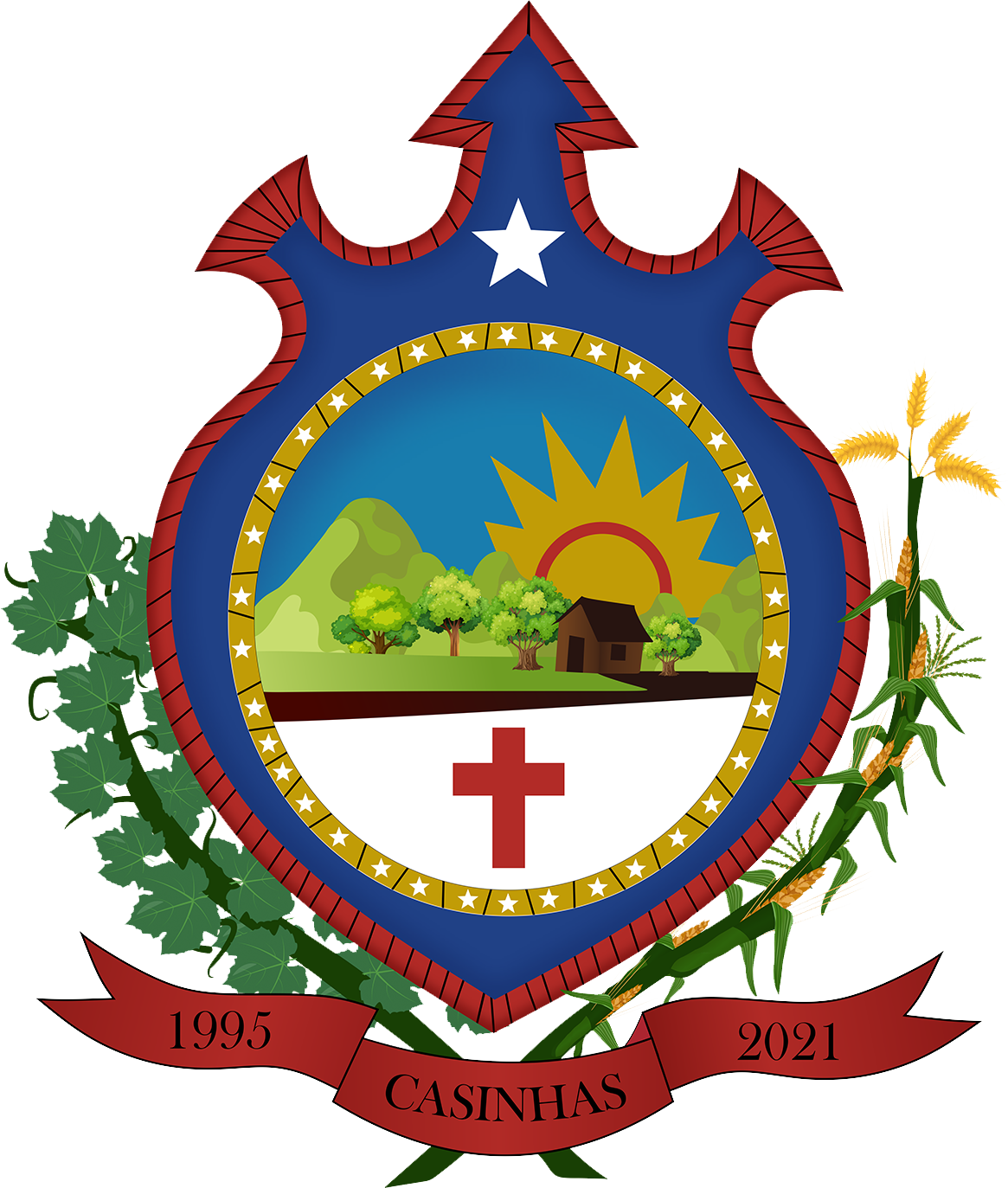
- Flag Coat of arms
- Etymology: Little houses
- Location within Brazil
- Coordinates: 07°44′27″S 35°43′15″W
- Country: Brazil
- State: Pernambuco
- Mesoregion: Agreste of Pernambuco

Area
  - Total: 125.28 km^{2} (48.37 sq mi)
- Elevation: 390 m (1,280 ft)

Population (2022 Census)
  - Total: 12,967
  - Estimate (2025): 13,468
  - Density: 103.50/km^{2} (268.07/sq mi)
- Time zone: UTC−3 (BRT)

Casinhas or little houses (Central northeastern portuguese pronunciation: [kaˈzĩj̃ɐ(s)]) (population: 13,468) is a city in northeastern Brazil, in the State of Pernambuco. It lies in the mesoregion of Agreste of Pernambuco and has 125.28 sq/km of total area.

== Geography ==
- State - Pernambuco
- Region - Agreste of Pernambuco
- Boundaries - Paraíba (N), Surubim (S) Bom Jardim and Orobó (E); Vertentes do Lério (W).
- Area - 125.28 km^{2}
- Elevation - 390 m
- Hydrography - Capibaribe and Goiana Rivers
- Vegetation - Caatinga hipoxerófila
- Annual average temperature - 23.3 c
- Distance to Recife - 133 km

== Economy ==
The main economic activities in Casinhas is agribusiness, especially farming of cattle, goats and sheep.

=== Economic Indicators ===
Population	GDP x(1000 R$).	GDP pc (R$)	PE
14,368	38,794	2.642	0.06%

Economy by Sector 2006

Primary sector	Secondary sector	Service sector
11.30%	7.93%	80.77%

=== Health Indicators ===
HDI (2000)	Hospitals (2007)	Hospitals beds (2007)	Children's Mortality every 1000 (2005)
0.588	3	33	10.5

== See also ==
- List of municipalities in Pernambuco
