= São Bento, Paraíba =

Coordinates: 6°29′09″S 37°27′03″W

- Municipality
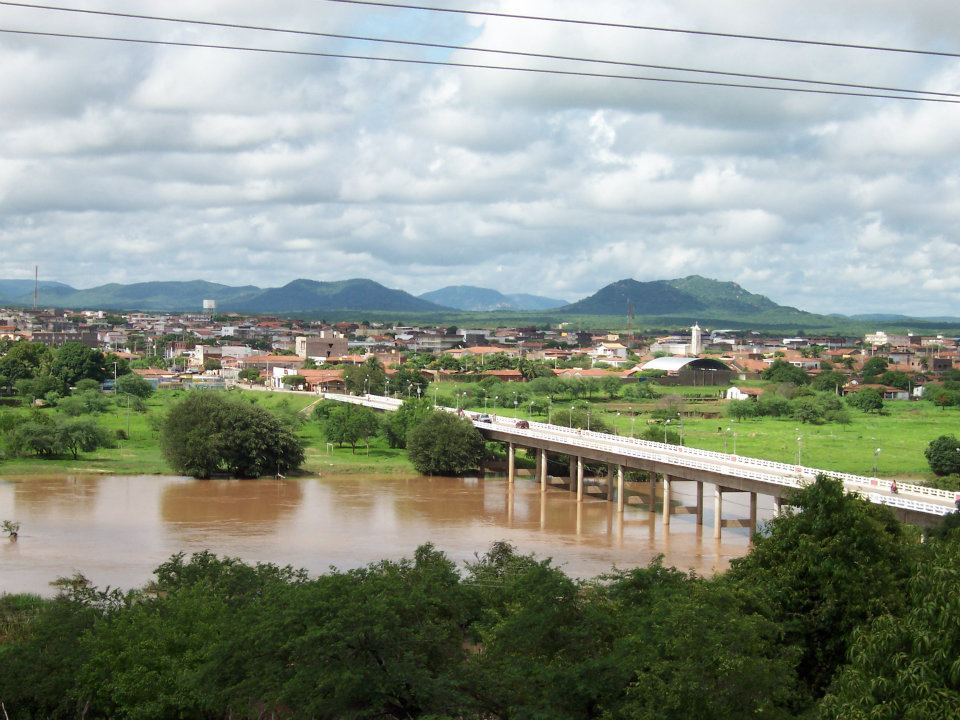

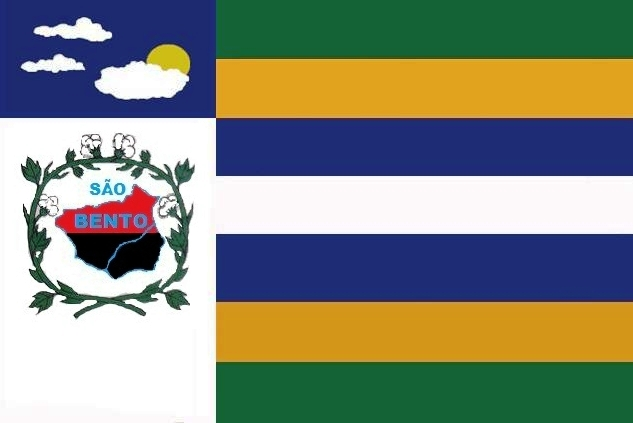
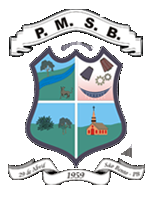
- Flag Coat of arms
- Nickname: São Bento das Redes
- Interactive map of São Bento, Paraíba
- Country: Brazil
- Region: Northeast
- State: Paraíba
- Mesoregion: backlands Paraibano
- Microregion: Catolé do Rocha

Government
  - Prefeito: Dr. Jarques Lúcio

Area
  - Total: 95,830 sq mi (248,198 km^{2})

Population (2020)
  - Total: 34,344
  - Density: 34,500/sq mi (13,322/km^{2})
- Time zone: UTC−3 (BRT)
- Postal code: 58865-000

São Bento, Paraíba is a municipality in the state of Paraíba in the Northeast Region of Brazil.

== History ==
In the late nineteenth century, the banks of the Rio Piranhas lived in the region known as a gentleman "Catonho" with his family and some residents of his farm known as Rattlesnake. Shortly after, he spent a priest by the name unknown to the city of Pombal (Paraíba), which would celebrate the Feast of the Rosary, which would have christened the place of São Bento, because almost being bitten by a snake, remaining to this day. Catonho dying, his son, and his cousin Manuel Vieira Leandro Pinto, neighboring properties, started development work with the aim of increasing the core, grouping residents and growing number of inhabitants.

As Belém do Brejo do Cruz e São José do Brejo do Cruz, São Bento had their land belonging to Brejo do Cruz. During the first years of foundation, São Bento already started to progress with some handloom manufacturing hammocks. With enough job offers already felt the need to shut down your Brejo do Cruz. Finally on April 29, 1959, after several popular events and common sense, was its political emancipation through Act 2073, authored by state Rep Tertullian de Brito, published in the Official Gazette in Paraíba. From there the city transposed new horizons.

Was chosen as the patron of the place and San Sebastian in his honor, built a chapel, completed in 1889. The Church has a bell donated by the two founders friends, who stands by the majesty of his sound. The first Mass was celebrated by Fr Emidio Cardoso in the same year of completion of the church.

== Economy ==
Founded on the banks of the Rio Piranhas, the city developed a great potential in the hammocks being the largest domestic producer of the industry branch. Currently, exports networks throughout the states of Brazil as well as most countries in South America, Africa, Europe and Asia.

Endless tons of hammocks are made, generating a large economic turnover in the domestic trade. This became the main factor by which, unlike most municipalities in the backlands of Paraiba, people do not feel the need to move to the urban centers of the country. It is for this reason that the city of São Bento presents a good growth rate in order to have one of the highest population densities in the backlands of Paraiba.

São Bento is known locally as the city that has a 0% unemployment rate and a large financial transaction, creating one of the largest in the state ICMS. Their networks are known throughout Brazil, playing a prominent place in the city of Jaguaruana, the state of Ceará.

== Culture ==
São Bento has some of the biggest events in the region, one of them is the biggest off-season St. John's region Arraiá Shaking Network that happens in July and has more than 30,000 people for 4 nights party also has the São Bento Fest which is also the biggest off-season carnival in the region, the Northeast area also helps a lot in music workshops, music performances and cultural exhibits that attracts thousands of people.

Religious events are also attractive as the Feast of Saint Sebastian, the Christ Praise organized by the Catholic charismatic renewal, and also the March for Jesus organized by evangelical churches in the city.

== See also ==
- List of mayors of São Bento (Paraíba)
- List of municipalities in Paraíba
- Riachão (São Bento)
