= Frei Miguelinho =

City in Pernambuco, Brazil

- Municipality
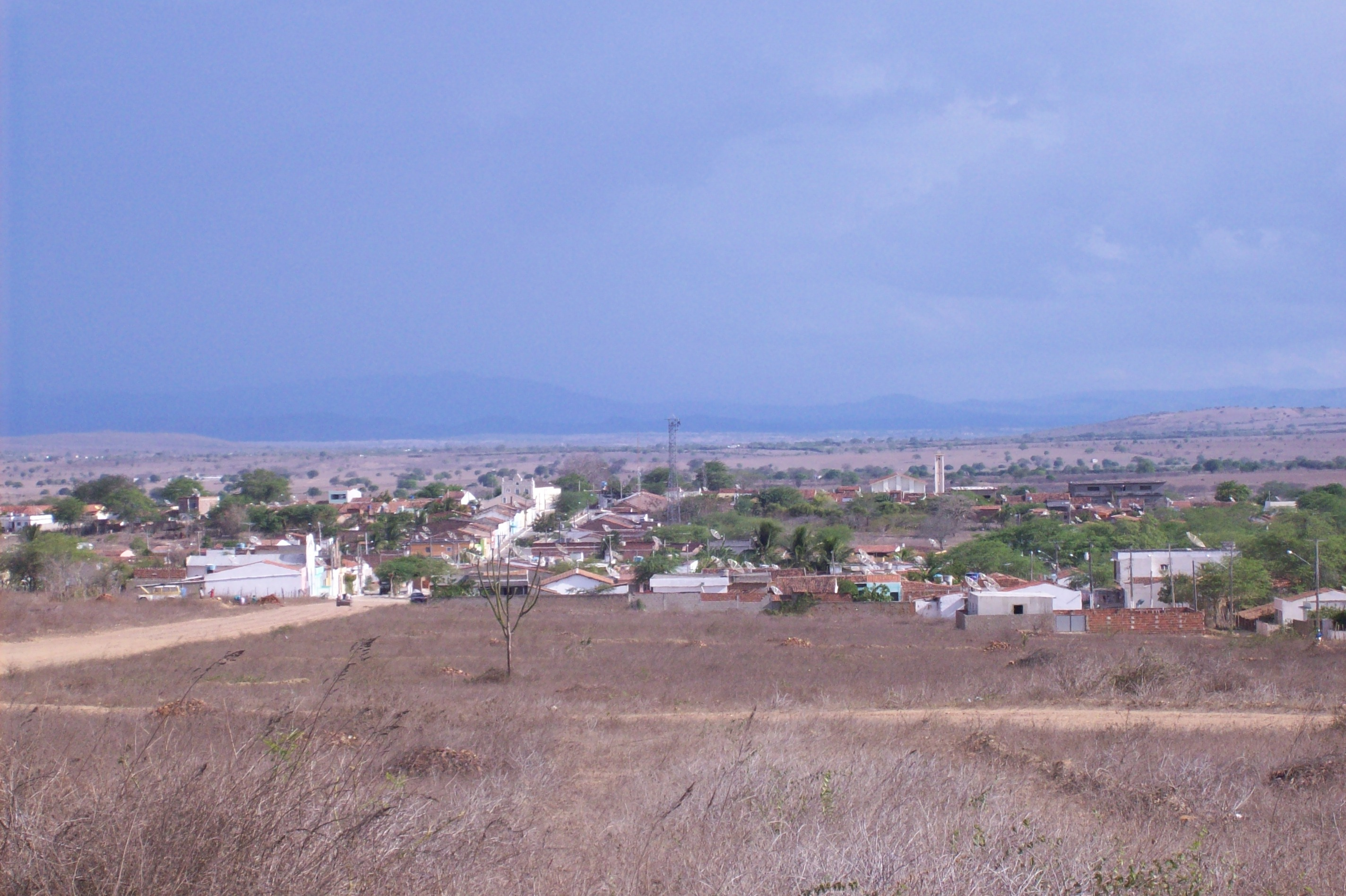
- Lagoa de João Carlos neighborhood

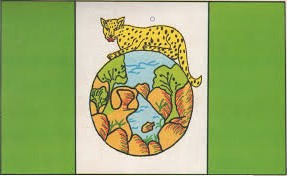
- Flag
- Etymology: Named in honor of a priest who stayed in the area during the Pernambucan revolt
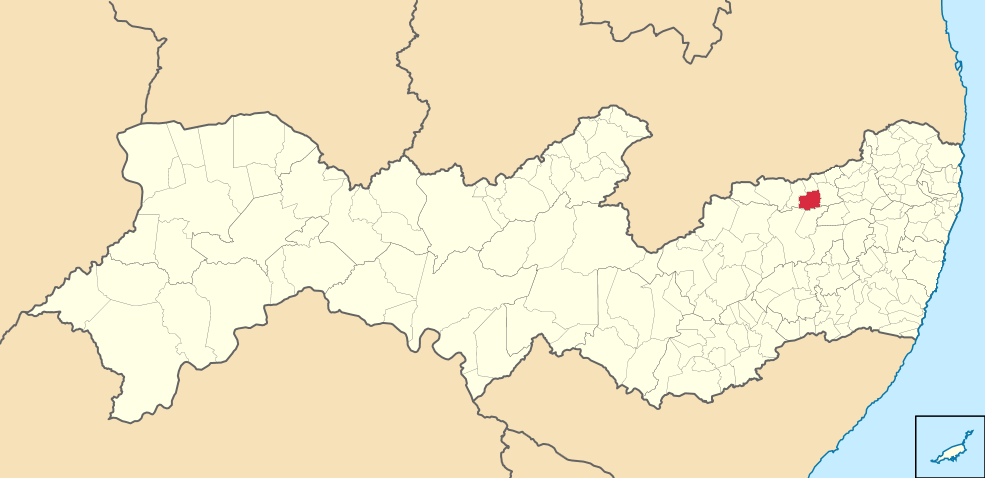
- Location of Frei Miguelinho in Pernambuco

- Location within Brazil Location within South America
- Coordinates: 7°56′44″S 35°55′20″W
- Country: Brazil
- Region: Northeast
- State: Pernambuco
- Founded: 20 December 1963

Government
  - Mayor: José Lindonaldo de França (PSB) (2025-2028)
  - Vice Mayor: Juarez Bezerra de Medeiros Junior (Avante) (2025-2028)

Area
  - Total: 212.707 km^{2} (82.127 sq mi)
- Elevation: 370 m (1,210 ft)

Population (2022 Census)
  - Total: 13,636
  - Estimate (2025): 14,055
  - Density: 64.11/km^{2} (166.0/sq mi)
- Demonym: Frei-miguelinhense (Brazilian Portuguese)
- Time zone: UTC-03:00 (Brasília Time)
- Postal code: 55780-000
- HDI (2010): 0.576 – medium
- Website: freimiguelinho.pe.gov.br

Frei Miguelinho (Central northeastern portuguese pronunciation: [ˈfɾej miɡɛˈlĩj̃u]) is a city in Pernambuco, Brazil.

== Geography ==
- State - Pernambuco
- Region - Agreste Pernambucano
- Boundaries - Santa Maria do Cambucá (N); Caruaru and Riacho das Almas (S); Surubim (E); Vertentes (W)
- Area - 212.7 km^{2}
- Elevation - 370 m
- Hydrography - Capibaribe River
- Vegetation - Caatinga hipoxerófila
- Climate - semi-arid, hot
- Annual average temperature - 23.9 c
- Distance to Recife - 166 km
- Population - 15,546 (2020)

== Economy ==
The main economic activities in Frei Miguelinho are based in agribusiness, especially the raising of cattle, goats, sheep and chickens.

=== Economic indicators ===
Population	GDP x(1000 R$).	GDP pc (R$)	PE
14.855	38.795	2.758	0.058%

Economy by sector

Primary sector	Secondary sector	Service sector
5.66%	8.66%	85.68%

=== Health indicators ===
HDI (2000)	Hospitals (2007)	Hospitals beds (2007)	Children's mortality every 1000 (2005)
0.610	1	12	14.9

== See also ==
- List of municipalities in Pernambuco
