= Chacrinha =

Brazilian television presenter (1917–1988)

- Born: José Abelardo Barbosa de Medeiros; September 30, 1917; Surubim, Pernambuco, Brazil
- Died: June 30, 1988 (aged 70); Rio de Janeiro, Rio de Janeiro, Brazil
- Occupations: TV presenter, comedian

José Abelardo Barbosa de Medeiros (September 30, 1917 – June 30, 1988), better known as Chacrinha (Portuguese pronunciation: [ʃaˈkɾiɲɐ]), was a Brazilian comedian, radio and TV personality. His career was at its peak from 1950 to 1980. He was author of a famous Brazilian phrase that states: "Na televisão, nada se cria, tudo se copia" ("In television, nothing is created, everything is copied"). Famous Brazilian celebrities made their debut on his show, such as Roberto Carlos and Raul Seixas.

He began as a radio presenter, and then enjoyed great success and inspired controversy with his anarchic sense of humor while hosting many TV shows on Globo and other networks in the 1950s, 1960s, 1970s and 1980s. He would interrupt the musical numbers of major stars, blow a horn like Harpo Marx while poking fun at guests and throw codfish to the audience.

== Biography ==
=== Childhood ===
Chacrinha was born in Surubim, Pernambuco. At the age of 10, he moved with his family to Campina Grande, Paraiba. At the age of 17, he went to the capital of Pernambuco, Recife to study. He was admitted to medical school in 1936 and in 1937 he had his first contact with radio at radio Clube Pernambuco, when he gave a speech about alcoholism. Chacrinha, besides several financial crisis in his family throughout his life, had a peaceful childhood.

=== Beginning of career ===
In Recife, the starting point of his career, he finished his studies and everything seemed to point medical school for his future. Because he did not want to spend a year in the military, he falsified his date of birth on his identification document and ended up at Tiro de Guerra, a Brazilian military institution. After this experience, he started playing drums. Two years after beginning his medical studies, in 1938, he was saved by graduate colleagues from severe appendicitis. While still recovering from the surgery, he, as a percussionist at the group Bando Academico, decided to travel as a musician in a ship called Bage, heading to Germany. However, on that day in 1939, the Second World War forced him to cancel his plans and land at Brazil's then capital, Rio de Janeiro. There, he became a speaker at Rádio Tupi. In 1943, he started a Carnival music show called Rei Momo na Chacrinha ("King Momo at the Farm") at Radio Fluminense, which became very successful. He was from then on known as Abelardo "Chacrinha" Barbosa. In the 1950s he would command several successful shows, in which he released various successes in the genre of Brazilian music. In one of his shows, Cassino do Chacrinha ("Chacrinha's Casino"), he pretended, with sounds and noises, to be throwing big parties and would make people expect big releases.

=== Career in TV ===
In 1956, he began appearing on the show Rancho Alegre, at TV Tupi, where he also started his show Discoteca do Chacrinha (Chacrinha Disco). After that, he went to TV Rio, and in 1967, he was contracted by Rede Globo. At some point in his career, he maintained two weekly shows: Buzina do Chacrinha (Chacrinha's Honk) and Discoteca do Chacrinha. Five years later he went back to TV Tupi. In 1978 he transferred to TV Bandeirantes and in 1982 he returned to Rede Globo, where his two shows became one: Cassino do Chacrinha. This show was successful on Saturday evenings.

== Coined expressions ==
One of his most well known phrases would be "In television, nothing is created, everything is copied".

In one of his shows, he would introduce himself wearing funny and sloppy clothes, honking a hand honk to declassify participants, while joking and mocking them with then famous expressions such as "Teresinha!", "Eu vim aqui pra confundir, nao pra explicar!" ("I came here to make you confused, not to explain!") and "Quem nao se comunica, se trumbica!" ("Whoever doesn't communicate, gets in trouble!").

In an interview, Chacrinha explained that the non-sense expression "Teresinha!" came from one of his sponsors, a bleach product called Clarinha. He would advertise them and by the end he would say "Clarinha, Clarinha.". He said that the public liked how that sounded somehow, and when the sponsorship was over, he decided he needed something to substitute. That's when Teresinha came up.

== Chacretes and judges ==
The judges would help him maintain the fake party climate. Another element for the success of his shows were the Chacretes, professional dancers that would make choreographs to the music and cheer up the show.

== Carnival and death ==
Annually, Chacrinha would release at his show a new Carnival hit. Known as Velho Guerreiro (Old Warrior), in 1987, the Samba School Imperio Serrano made him a homage. That was the only time he participated in a carnival parade. In 1987, he received the title of Doctor Honoris Causa. On his seventieth anniversary, the then Brazil's president Jose Sarney hosted a dinner in his honor.

In 1988, already sick, he was substituted in some of his shows by João Kléber. He would return in June of the same year. He died on June 30, 1988, at 11:30 pm, from a heart attack and throat cancer. His last show was aired on July 2, 1988.

== Curiosities ==
When cod was not selling well in a store called Casas da Banha, his sponsor in TV Tupi, he decided he would try to revert the situation. During the show, he would turn to the public and ask "Do you want codfish?!" and then would throw a codfish to the auditorium, where the public would fight for the product. The sales exploded. He explained "Brazilians like to receive gifts".

In the lyrics of his 1969 hit song, "Aquele Abraço," the Brazilian MPB singer-songwriter Gilberto Gil included an homage to Chacrinha, writing "Chacrinha keeps on swinging his belly and honking his horn at the girls...Hello, hello, Mr. Chacrinha, old warrior."

== In film ==
On October 30, 2009, a documentary film about Chacrinha was released in Brazil. The film, directed by Brazilian filmmaker Nélson Hoineff, was titled Alô Alô Terezinha (a nonsense expression constantly cited by Chacrinha in his TV shows).

"Chacrinha, o Velho Guerreiro" a biopic directed by Andrucha Waddington, was released in 2018, with Stepan Nercessian in the title role.
