= Cumaru =

City in Pernambuco, Brazil

- Municipality of Pernambuco, Brazil
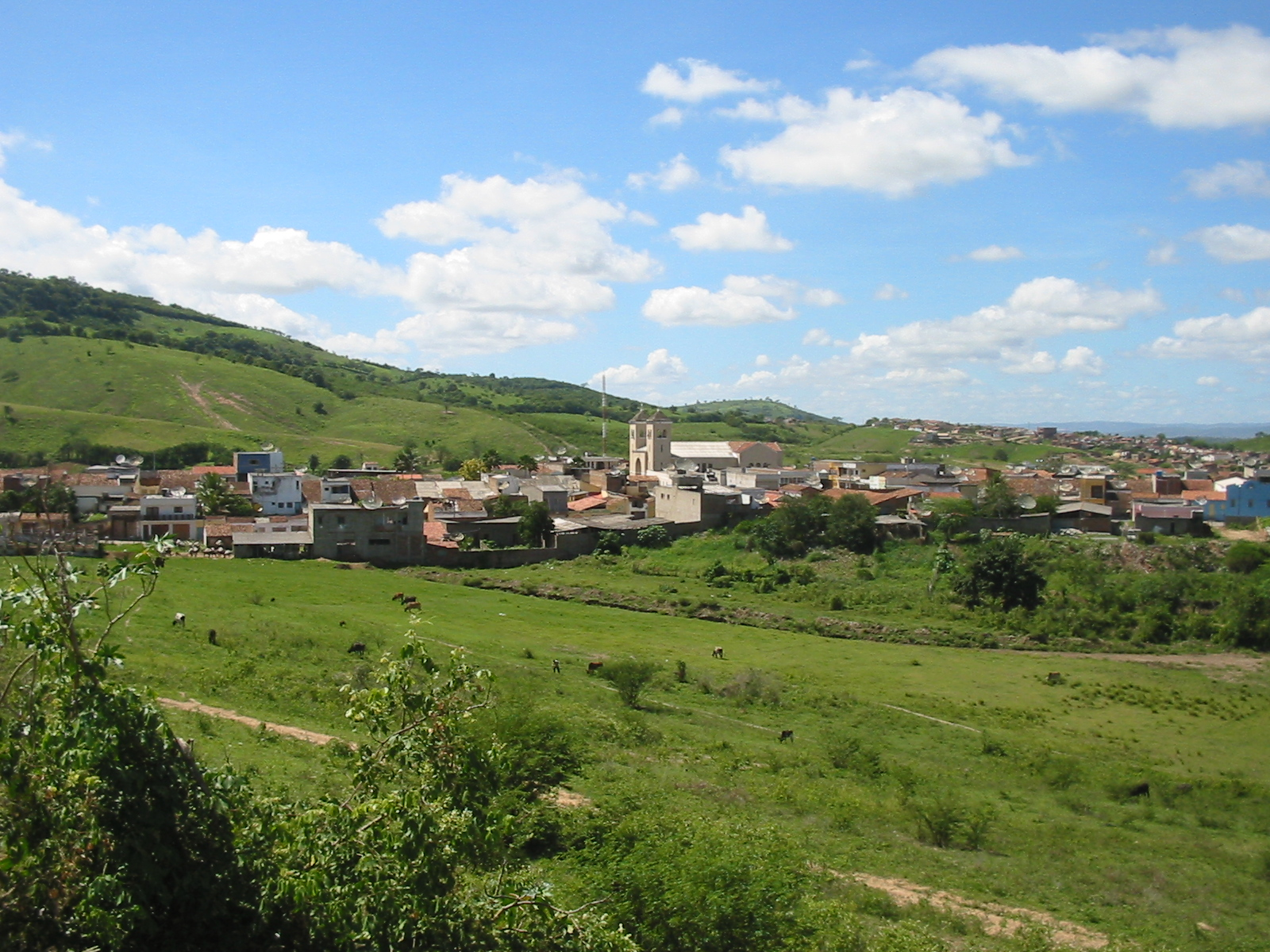
- View of Cumaru

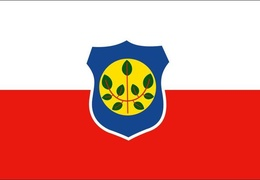
- Flag Coat of arms
- Motto: Brazilian Portuguese: Para frente, sempre avançar English: Forward, always advancing
- Location of Cumaru in Pernambuco

- Location within Brazil Location within South America
- Coordinates: 8°0′21″S 35°41′49″W
- Country: Brazil
- Region: Northeast
- State: Pernambuco
- Founded: 20 December 1963

Government
  - Mayor: Maria Zeneide Medeiros da Costa (PSB) (2025-2028)
  - Vice Mayor: José Gomes da Silva Filho (PSB) (2025-2028)'

Area
  - Total: 291.429 km^{2} (112.521 sq mi)
- Elevation: 443 m (1,453 ft)

Population (2022 Census)
  - Total: 15,920
  - Estimate (2025): 16,215
  - Density: 54.48/km^{2} (141.1/sq mi)
- Demonym: Cumaruense (Brazilian Portuguese)
- Time zone: UTC-03:00 (Brasília Time)
- Postal code: 55655-000, 55658-000
- HDI (2010): 0.572 – medium
- Website: cumaru.pe.gov.br

Cumaru (Central northeastern portuguese pronunciation: [kumɐˈɾu]) is a city in the state of Pernambuco, Brazil. It is 132 km away from the state capital Recife, and has an estimated (IBGE 2020) population of 10,192 inhabitants.

== Geography ==
- State - Pernambuco
- Region - Agreste Pernambucano
- Boundaries - Surubim (N); Bezerros (S); Passira (E); Riacho das Almas (W).
- Area - 292.24 km^{2}
- Elevation - 443 m
- Hydrography - Capibaribe River
- Vegetation - Caatinga hipoxerófila
- Climate - Semi arid hot
- Annual average temperature - 25.0 c
- Distance to Recife - 132 km

== Economy ==
The main economic activities in Cumaru are based in agribusiness, especially beans, corn; and livestock such as cattle, sheep, goats, pigs and poultry.

=== Economic indicators ===
Population	GDP x(1000 R$).	GDP pc (R$)	PE
13.812	52.455	3.201	0.09%

Economy by Sector 2006

Primary sector	Secondary sector	Service sector
7.41%	8.39%	84.20%

=== Health indicators ===
HDI (2000)	Hospitals (2007)	Hospitals beds (2007)	Children's Mortality every 1000 (2005)
0.575	1	31	49.7

== Gallery ==
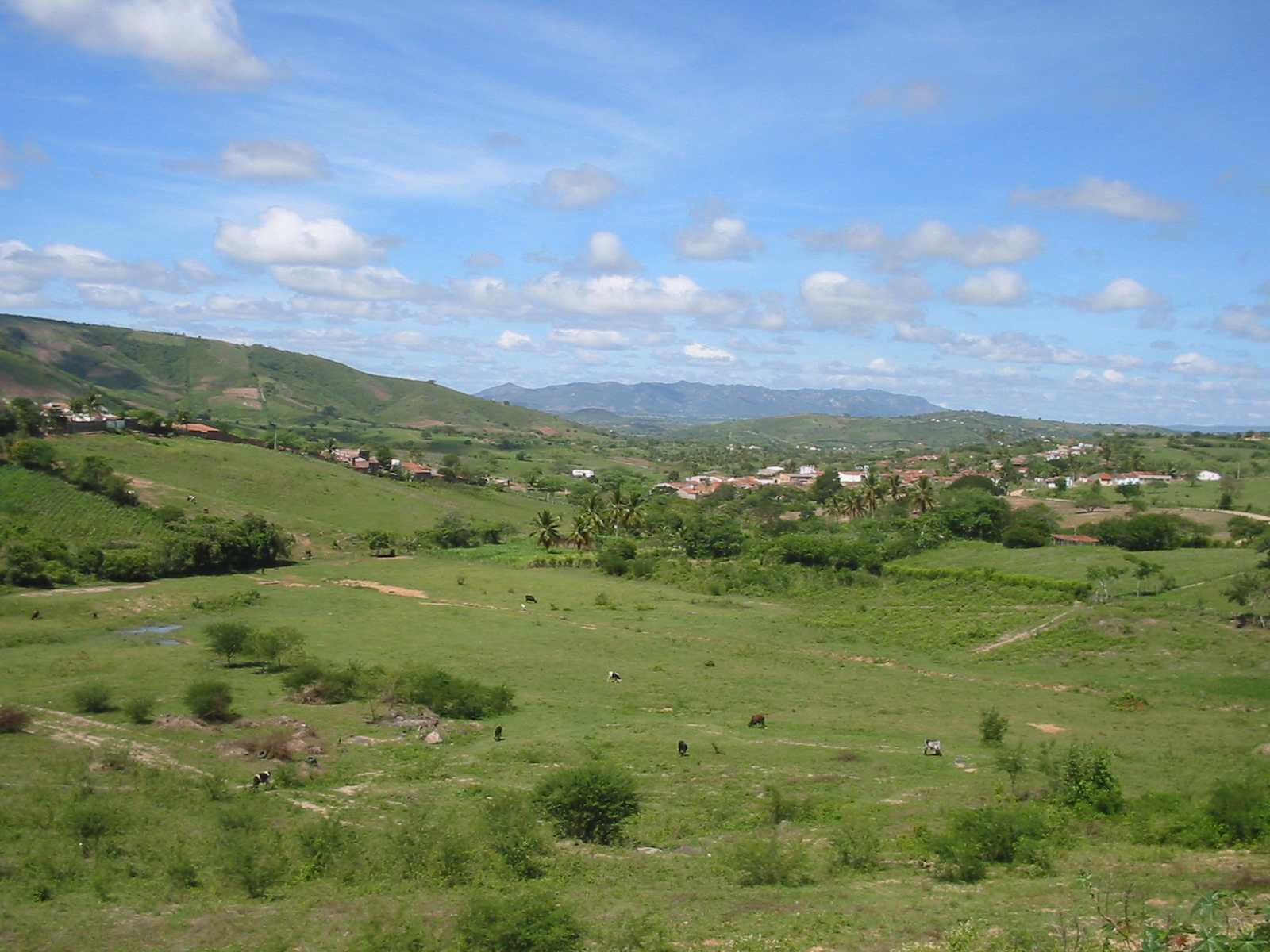
Rural area view of Cumaru

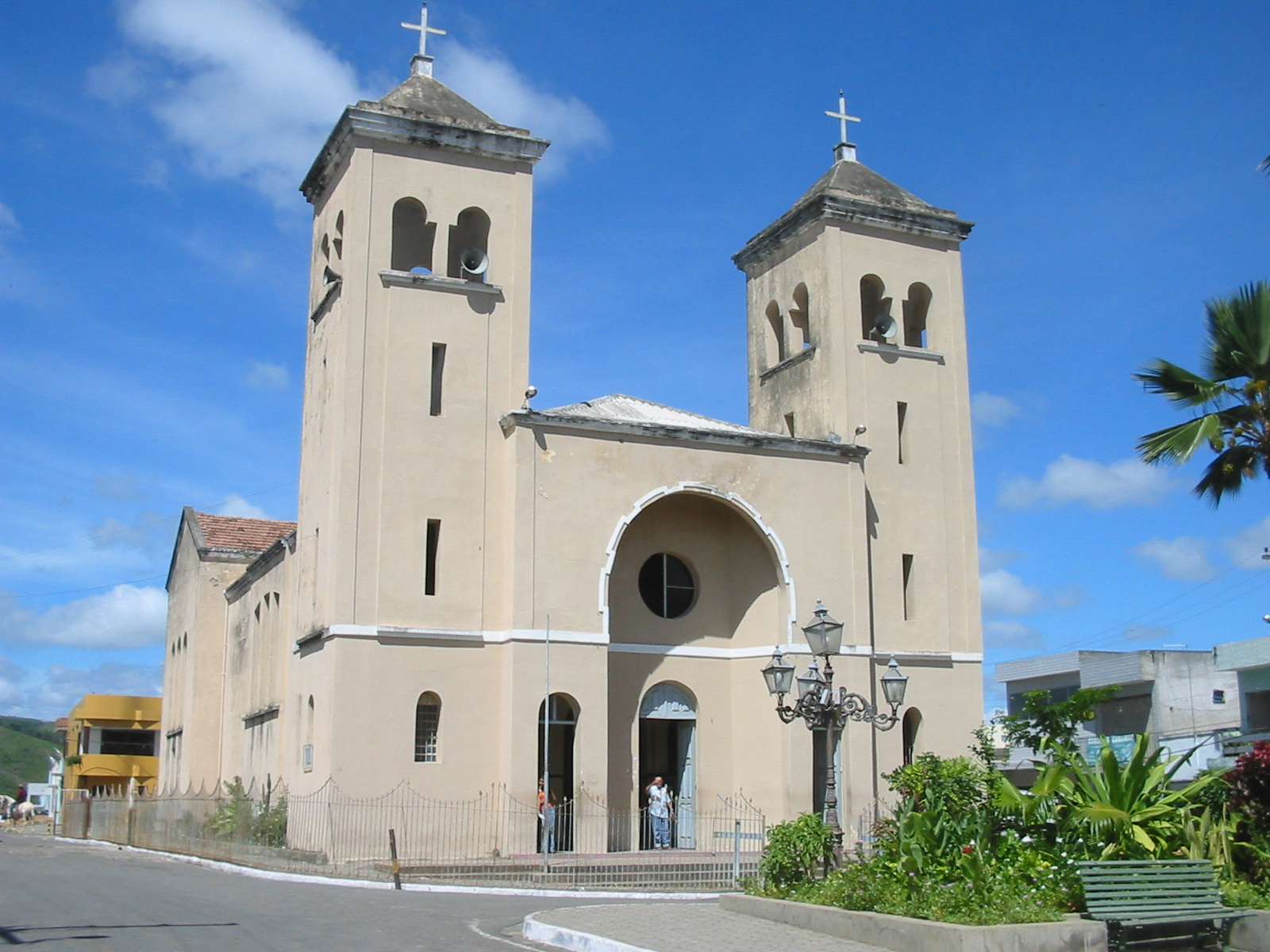
Parish of Saint Therese Church

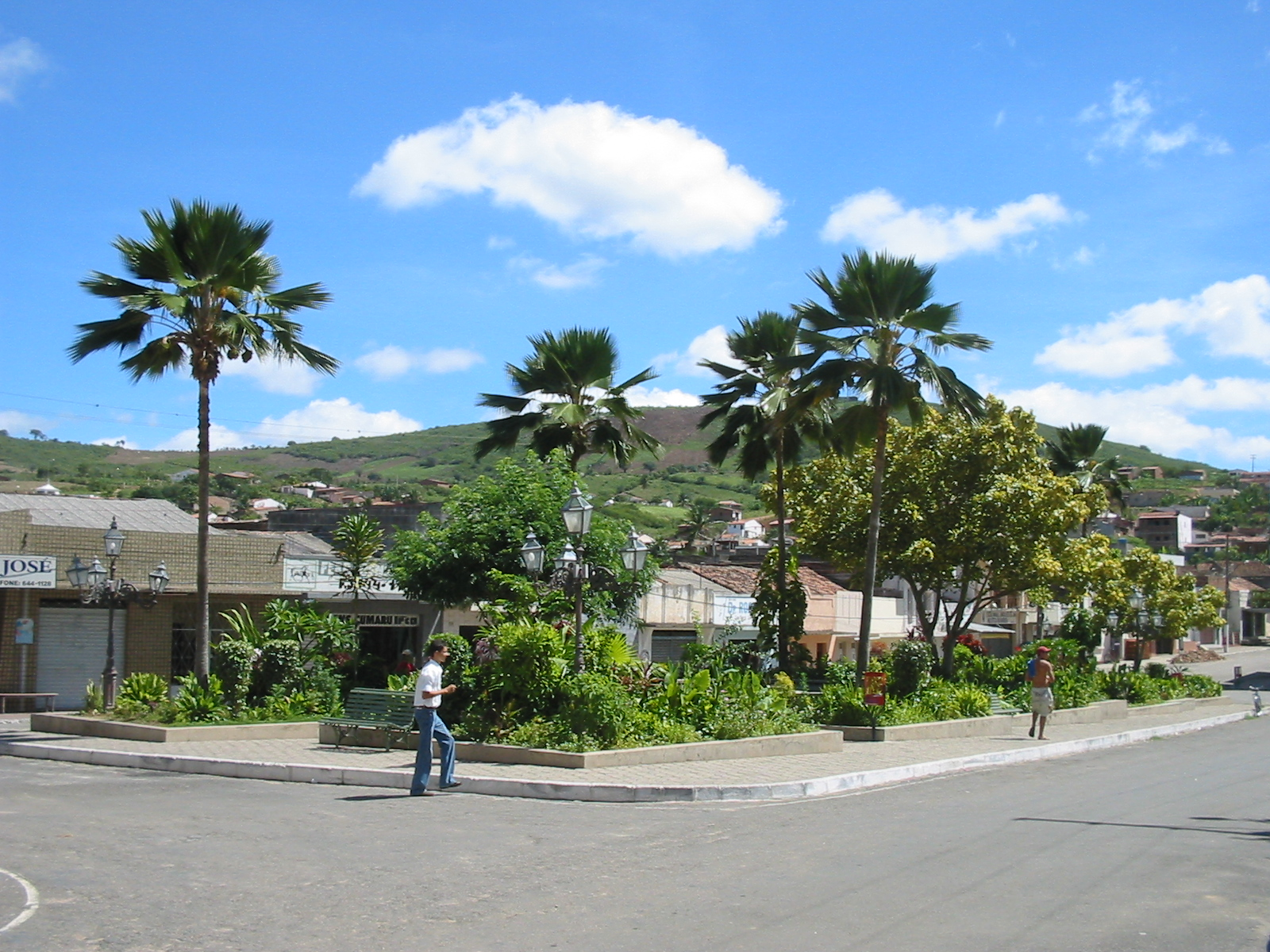
Virginia Heraclio Plaza

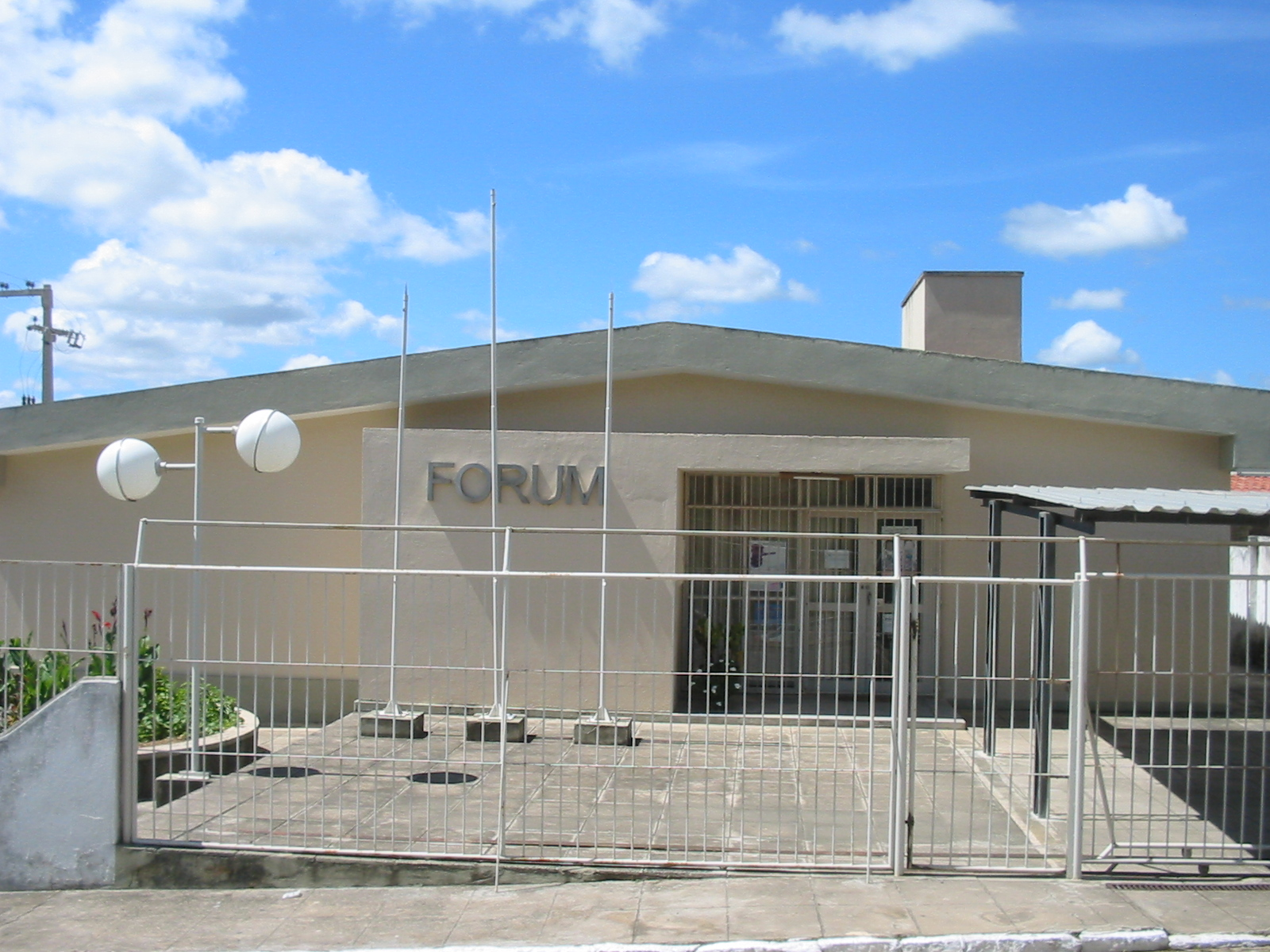
Cumaru Courthouse

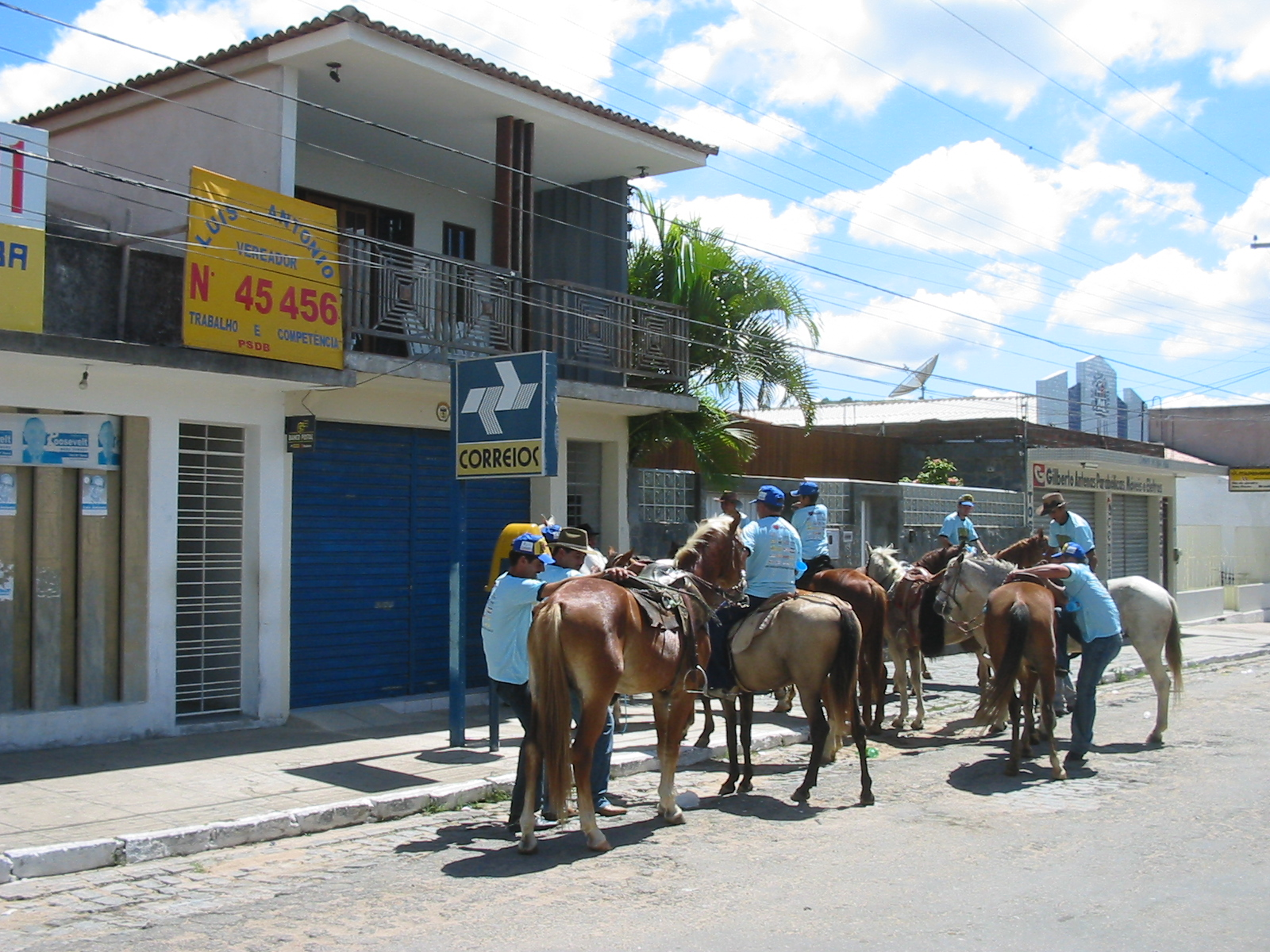
Cumaru Correios post office

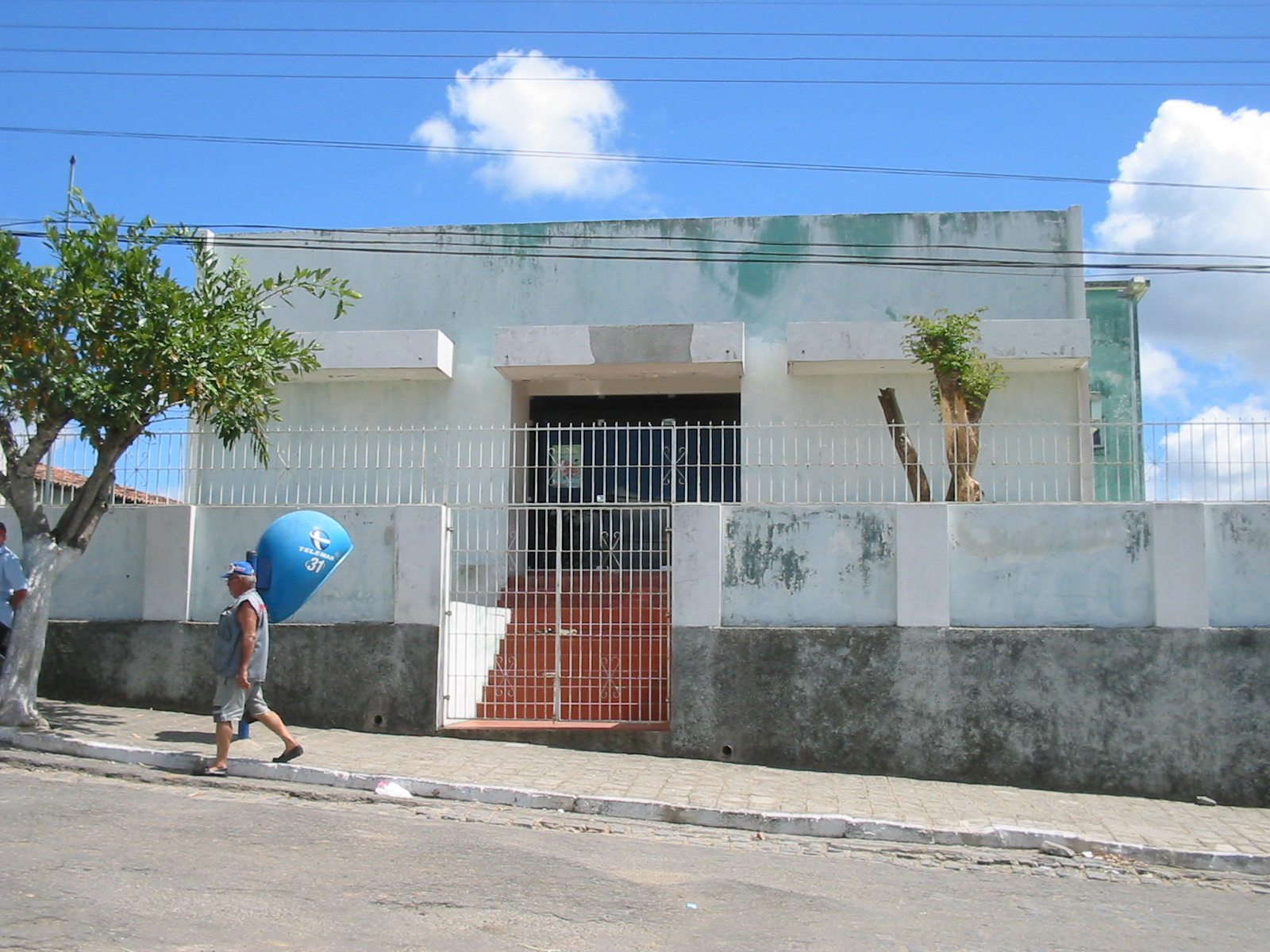
Cumaru City Hall

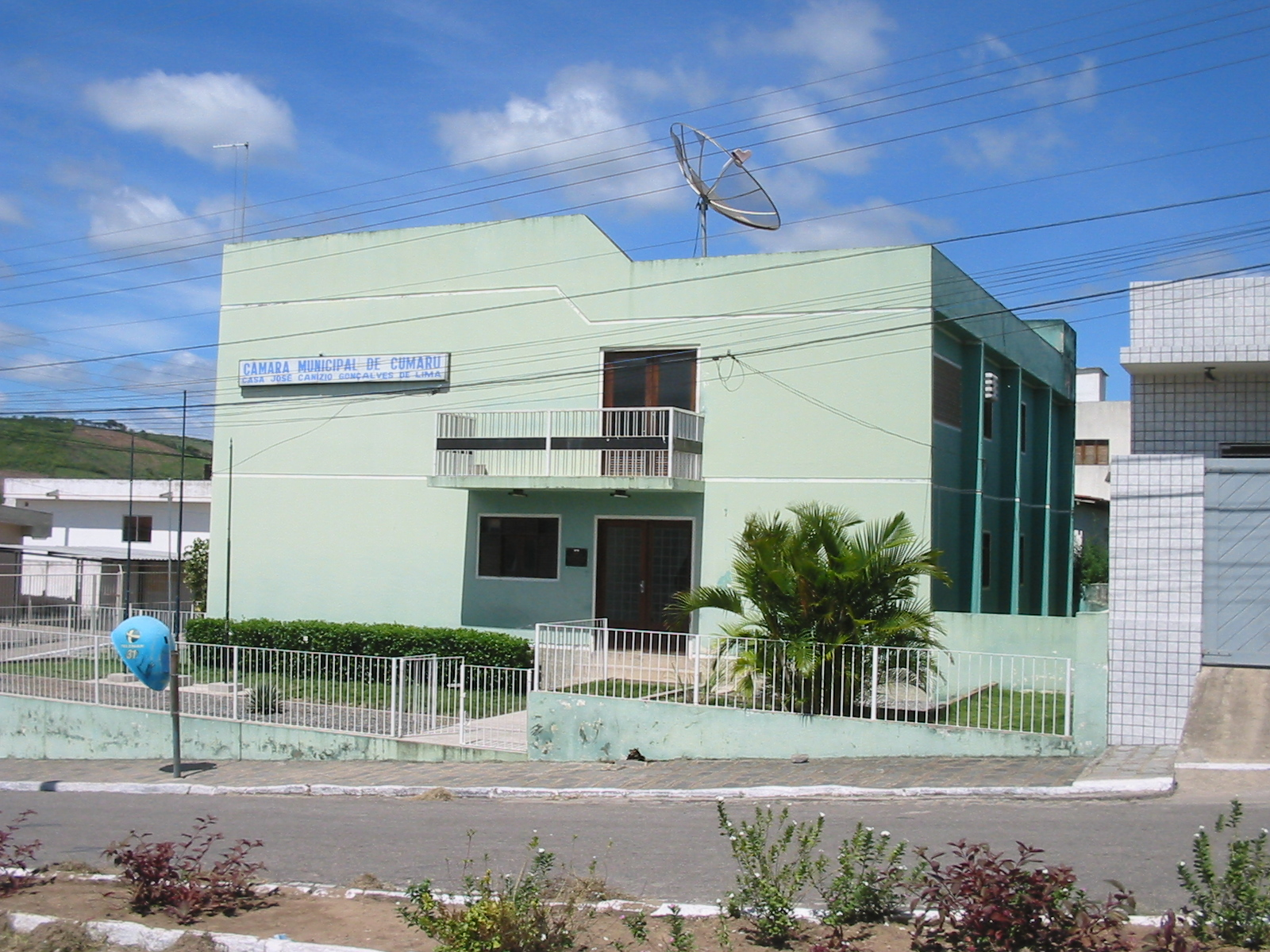
Cumaru Municipal Council

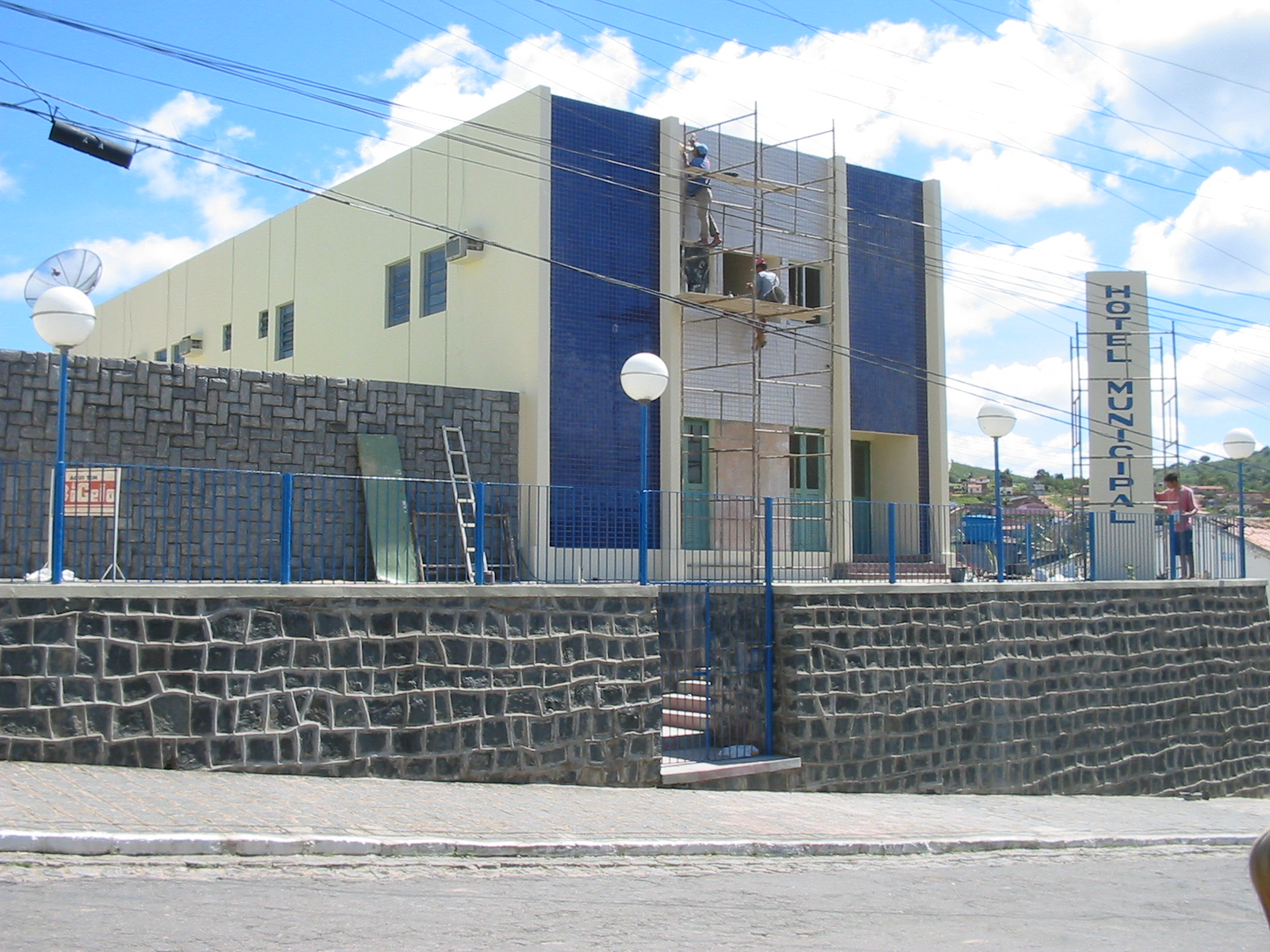
Municipal hotel

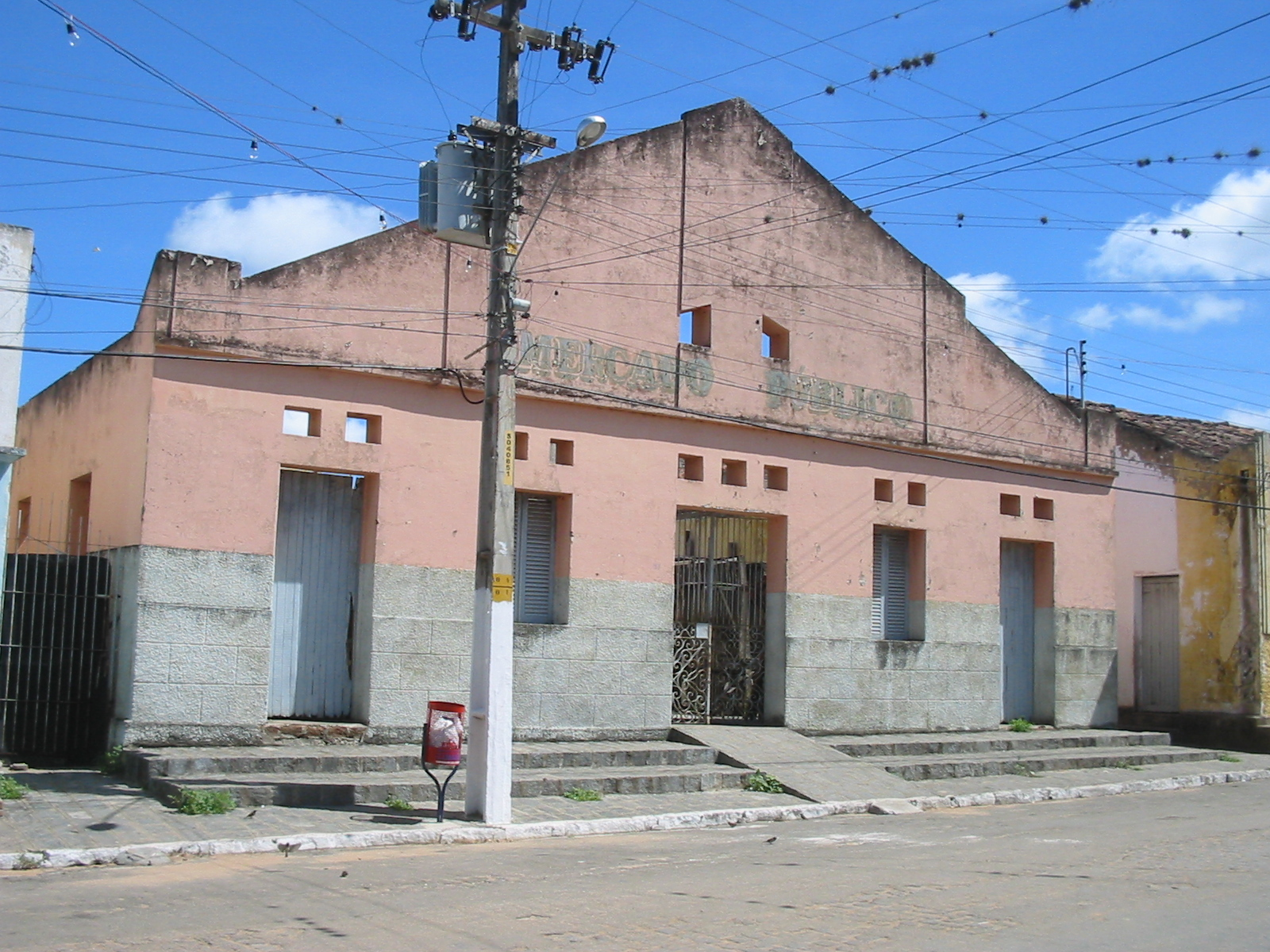
Public Market

== See also ==
- List of municipalities in Pernambuco
