= Vertente do Lério =

Municipality in Pernambuco, Brazil

- Municipality of Pernambuco, Brazil
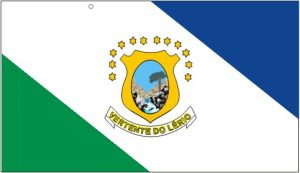
- Flag
- Etymology: In English "Lério's Spring", named after a spring in the area where a man named Lério built his house next to
- Location of Vertente do Lério in Pernambuco

- Location within Brazil Location within South America
- Coordinates: 7°46′15″S 35°51′0″W
- Country: Brazil
- Region: Northeast
- State: Pernambuco
- Founded: 1 October 1991

Government
  - Mayor: Histênio Júnior da Silva Sales (MDB) (2025-2028)
  - Vice Mayor: Jose Silva de Siqueira (UNIÃO) (2025-2028)

Area
  - Total: 73.631 km^{2} (28.429 sq mi)
- Elevation: 290 m (950 ft)

Population (2022 Census)
  - Total: 7,558
  - Estimate (2025): 7,776
  - Density: 102.65/km^{2} (265.9/sq mi)
- Demonym: Vertentense do lério (Brazilian Portuguese)
- Time zone: UTC-03:00 (Brasília Time)
- Postal code: 55760-000
- HDI (2010): 0.563 – medium
- Website: vertentedolerio.pe.gov.br

Vertente do Lério (Central northeastern portuguese pronunciation: [vɛɦˈtẽti ˈdu ˈlɛɾɪu]) is a municipality/city in the state of Pernambuco in Brazil. The population in 2022 Census, according with IBGE was 7,558 inhabitants and the total area is 73.63 km^{2}.

== Geography ==
- State - Pernambuco
- Region - Agreste of Pernambuco
- Boundaries - Paraíba state (N); Surubim (S); Casinhas (E); Santa Maria do Cambucá (W).
- Area - 67.07 km^{2}
- Elevation - 290 m
- Hydrography - Capibaribe River
- Vegetation - Caatinga hiperxerófila
- Climate - semi arid hot
- Annual average temperature - 24.4 c
- Distance to Recife - 143 km

== Economy ==
The main economic activities in Vertentes do Lério are related with mineral extraction industry and agribusiness, especially creations of cattle, sheep, goats and chickens.

=== Economic Indicators ===
Population	GDP x(1000 R$).	GDP pc (R$)	PE
7.464	28.221	3.763	0.047%

Economy by Sector

2006

Primary sector	Secondary sector	Service sector
4.34%	30.52%	65.14%

=== Health Indicators ===
HDI (2000)	Hospitals (2007)	Hospitals beds (2007)	Children's Mortality every 1000 (2005)
0.563	1	9	12.9

== See also ==
- List of municipalities in Pernambuco
