= Riachão do Poço =

Coordinates: 7.14194°S 35.2908°W

- Municipality
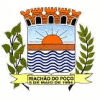
- Flag Coat of arms
- Interactive map of Riachão do Poço
- Country: Brazil
- Region: Northeast
- State: Paraíba
- Mesoregion: Mata Paraibana

Population (2020)
  - Total: 4,540
- Time zone: UTC−3 (BRT)

Riachão do Poço is a municipality in the state of Paraíba in the Northeast Region of Brazil.

== See also ==
- List of municipalities in Paraíba
