= Riachão, Paraíba =

Coordinates: 6°33′00″S 35°38′45″W

- Municipality
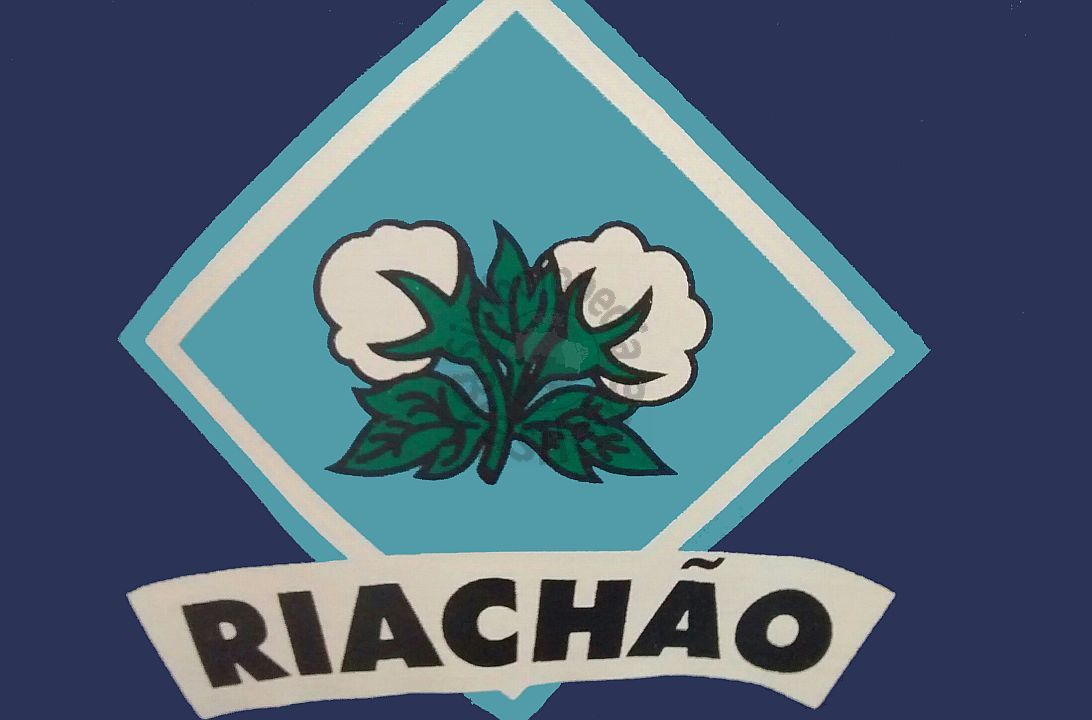
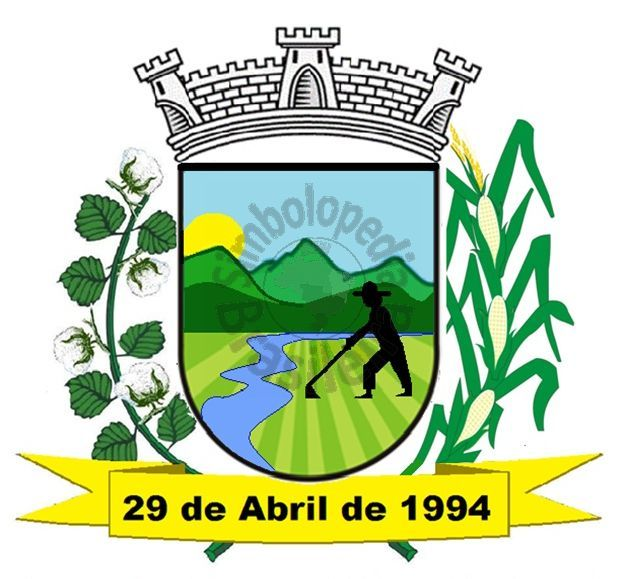
- Flag Coat of arms
- Interactive map of Riachão, Paraíba
- Country: Brazil
- Region: Northeast
- State: Paraíba
- Mesoregion: Agreste Paraibano

Population (2020)
  - Total: 3,619
- Time zone: UTC−3 (BRT)

Riachão (Central northeastern portuguese pronunciation: [hjɐˈʃɐ̃w]) is a municipality in the state of Paraíba in the Northeast Region of Brazil.

== See also ==
- List of municipalities in Paraíba
