= Riacho de Santo Antônio =

- Municipality
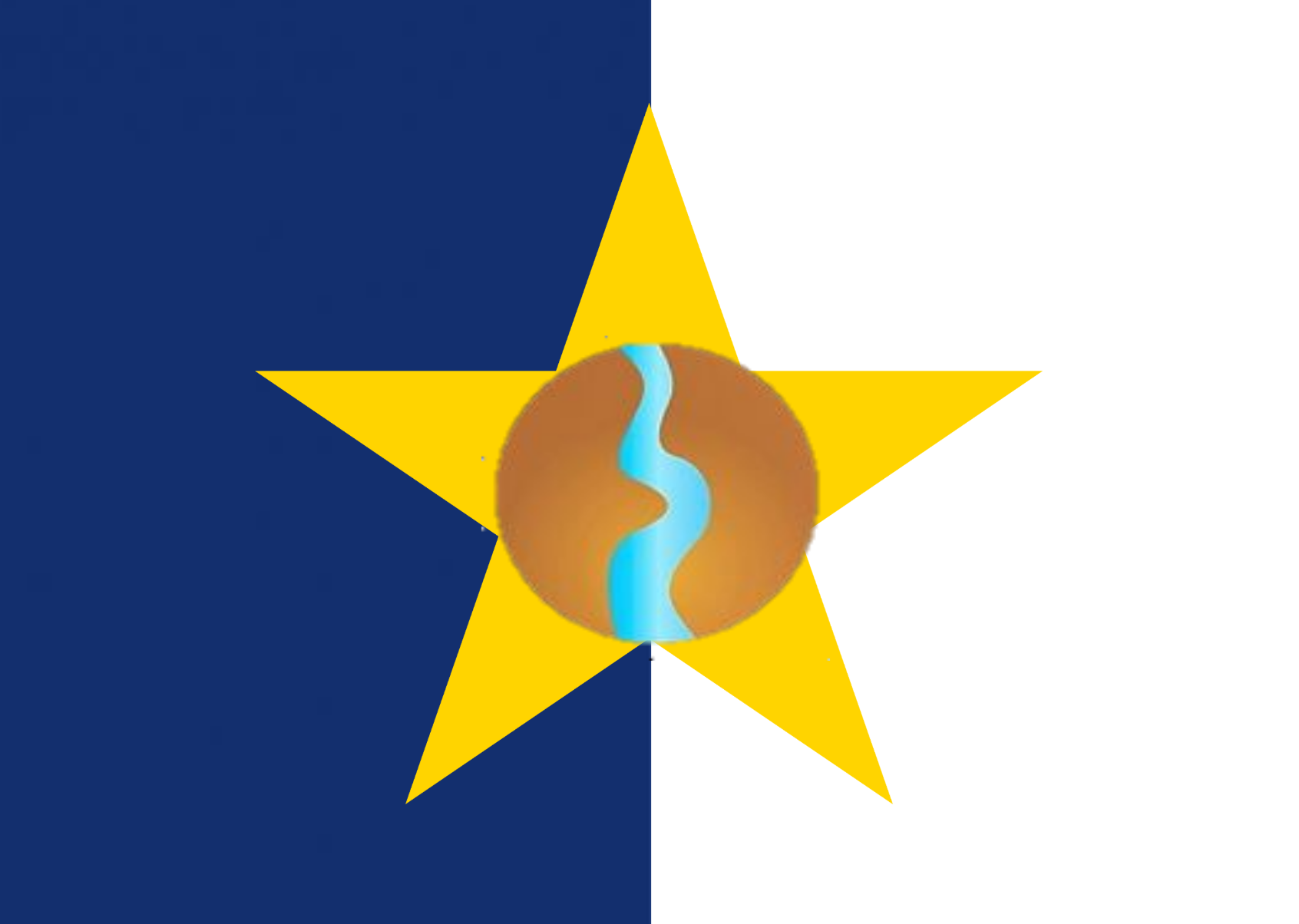
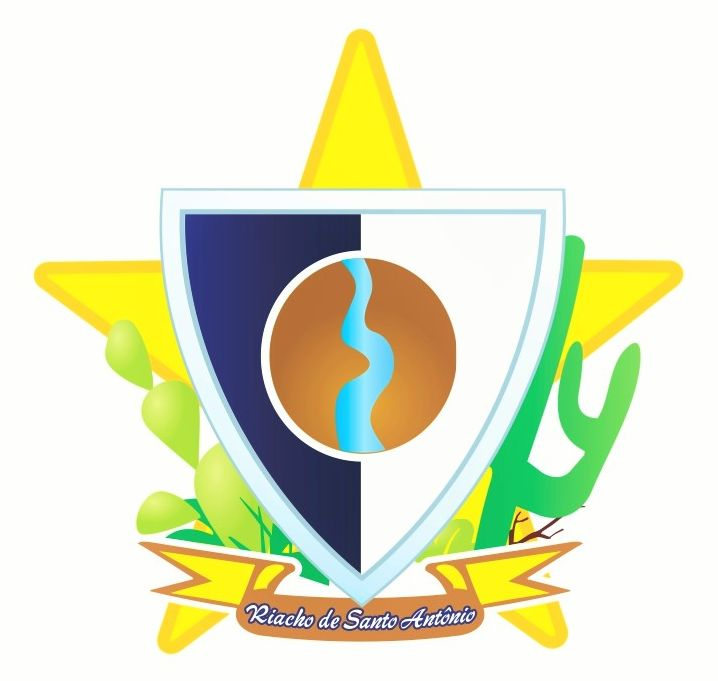
- Flag Coat of arms

- Location in Paraíba state

- Location in Brazil
- Coordinates: 7°41′S 36°09′W
- Country: Brazil
- Region: Northeast
- State: Paraíba
- Microregion: Cariri Oriental

Area
  - Total: 91.32 km^{2} (35.26 sq mi)

Population (2020)
  - Total: 1,974
  - Density: 21.62/km^{2} (55.99/sq mi)
- Time zone: UTC−3 (BRT)
- Postal code: 58465-xxx
- Area code: +55-83

Riacho de Santo Antônio (Central northeastern portuguese pronunciation: [hiˈɐʃŭ di sɐ̃tɐ̃ˈtõj̃]) is a municipality in the state of Paraíba in Brazil. The population is 1,974 (2020 est.) in an area of 91.32 km².
