= Vertentes =

Municipality in Pernambuco, Brazil

- Municipality of Pernambuco, Brazil
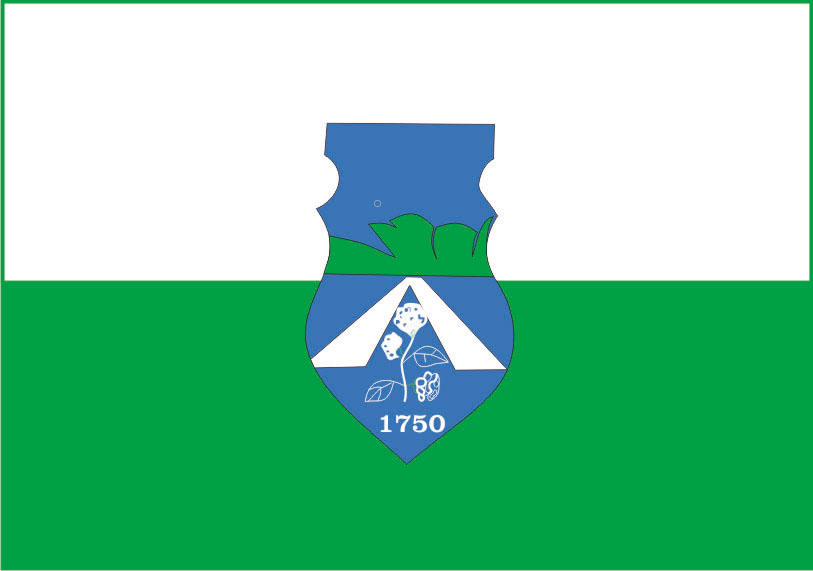
- Flag

- Location of Vertentes in Pernambuco

- Location within Brazil Location within South America
- Coordinates: 7°54′10″S 35°59′16″W
- Country: Brazil
- Region: Northeast
- State: Pernambuco
- Founded: 18 April 1892

Government
  - Mayor: Israel Ferreira de Andrade (PSDB) (2025-2028)
  - Vice Mayor: Igor Miranda Leandro Bezerra (Republicanos) (2025-2028)

Area
  - Total: 196.325 km^{2} (75.802 sq mi)
- Elevation: 401 m (1,316 ft)

Population (2022 Census)
  - Total: 21,959
  - Estimate (2025): 23,127
  - Density: 111.85/km^{2} (289.7/sq mi)
- Demonym: Vertentense (Brazilian Portuguese)
- Time zone: UTC-03:00 (Brasília Time)
- Postal code: 55770-000, 55774-000, 55775-000, 55776-000
- HDI (2010): 0.582 – medium
- Website: vertentes.pe.gov.br

Vertentes (Central northeastern portuguese pronunciation: [vɛɦˈtẽti(s)]) is a municipality/city in the state of Pernambuco in Brazil. The population in 2020, according with IBGE was 20,954 inhabitants and the total area is 196.325 km^{2}.

== Geography ==
- State - Pernambuco
- Region - Agreste of Pernambuco
- Boundaries - Paraíba state (N); Caruaru and Toritama (S); Frei Miguelinho and Santa Maria do Cambucá (E); Taquaritinga do Norte (W).
- Area - 196.325 km^{2}
- Elevation - 401 m
- Hydrography - Capibaribe River
- Vegetation - Caatinga hipoxerófila
- Climate - Semi arid hot
- Annual average temperature - 23.7 c
- Distance to Recife - 151 km

== Economy ==
The main economic activities in Vertentes are related with mineral extraction industry and agribusiness, especially creations of cattle, goats, sheep and chickens.

=== Economic Indicators ===
Population	GDP x(1000 R$).	GDP pc (R$)	PE
18.186	49.097	2.885	0.081%

Economy by Sector 2006

Primary sector	Secondary sector	Service sector
10.00%	9.86%	80.14%

=== Health Indicators ===
HDI (2000)	Hospitals (2007)	Hospitals beds (2007)	Children's Mortality every 1000 (2005)
0.616	1	35	28

== See also ==
- List of municipalities in Pernambuco
