= Taquaritinga do Norte =

City in Pernambuco, Brazil

- Municipality of Pernambuco, Brazil
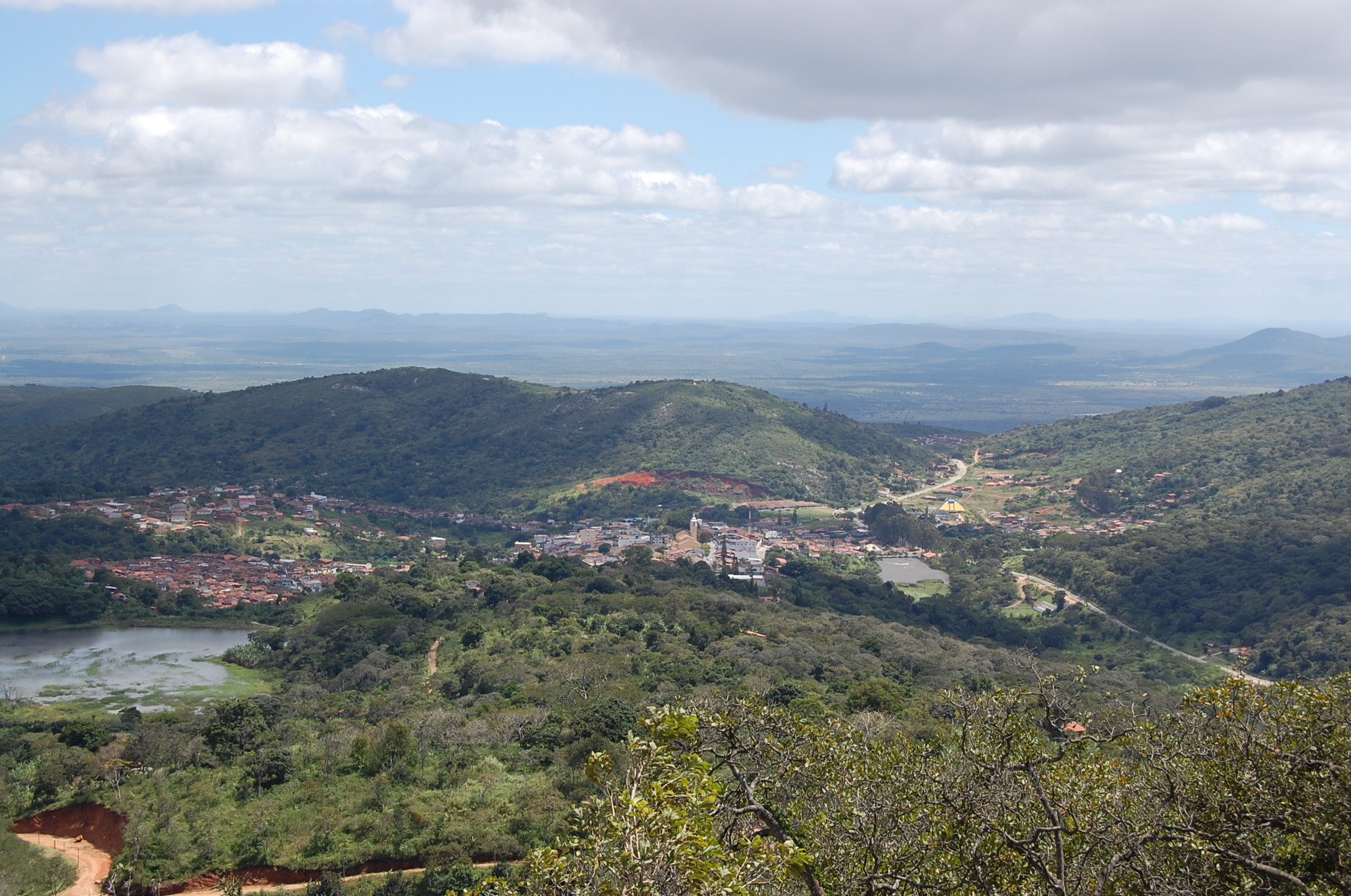
- Aerial view of Taquaritinga do Norte

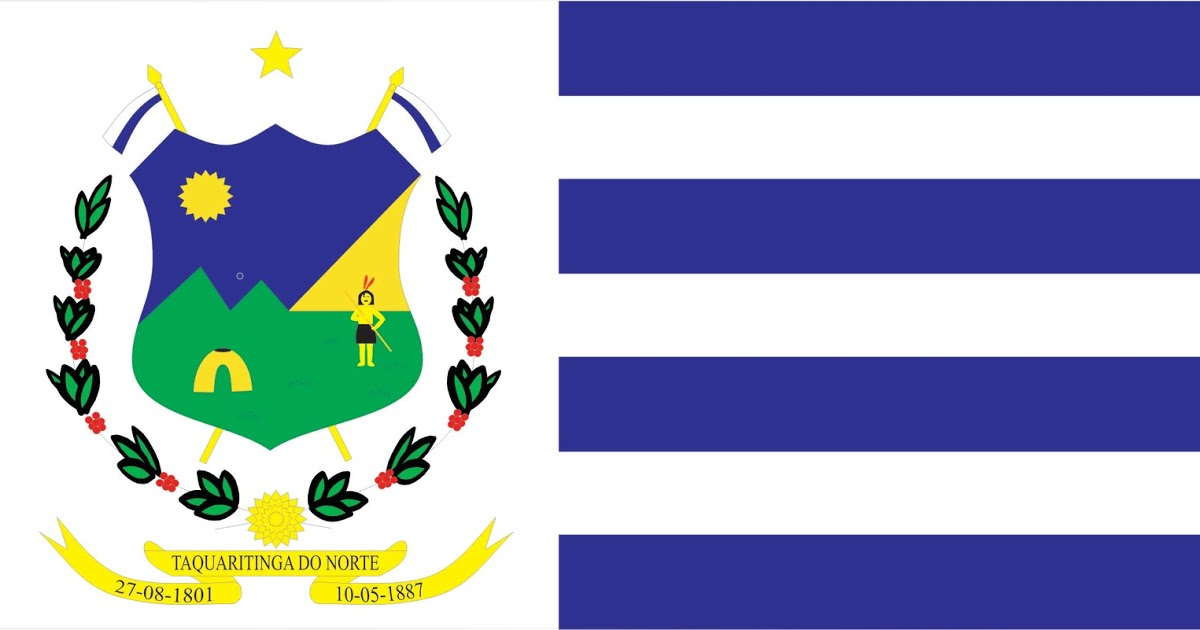
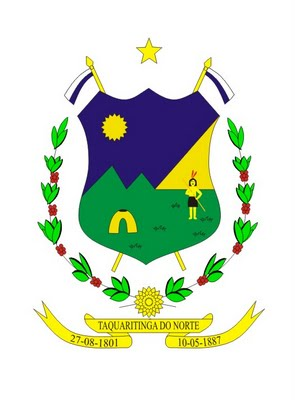
- Flag Coat of arms

- Location of Taquaritinga do Norte in Pernambuco

- Location within Brazil Location within South America
- Coordinates: 7°54′S 36°03′W
- Country: Brazil
- Region: Northeast
- State: Pernambuco
- Founded: 10 May 1887

Government
  - Mayor: Genivaldo Ferreira Lins (PP) (2025-2028)
  - Vice Mayor: Paulo César Dias (Solidariedade) (2025-2028)

Area
  - Total: 475.184 km^{2} (183.470 sq mi)
- Elevation: 785 m (2,575 ft)

Population (2022 Census)
  - Total: 24,736
  - Estimate (2025): 25,511
  - Density: 52.06/km^{2} (134.8/sq mi)
- Demonym: Norte taquaritinguense (Brazilian Portuguese)
- Time zone: UTC-03:00 (Brasília Time)
- Postal code: 55790-000, 55795-000, 55798-000
- HDI (2010): 0.641 – medium
- Website: taquaritingadonorte.pe.gov.br

Taquaritinga do Norte (Central northeastern portuguese pronunciation: [ˌtak͡wɐɾiˈtĩɡɐ ˈdu ˈnɔhti]) is a city in the state of Pernambuco, Brazil.

== Geography ==
- State - Pernambuco
- Region - Agreste of Pernambuco
- Boundaries - Paraíba (N); Caruaru, Toritama and Brejo da Madre de Deus (S); Vertentes (E); Santa Cruz do Capibaribe (W)
- Area - 475.2 km^{2}
- Elevation - 774 m
- Hydrography - Capibaribe River
- Vegetation - Caatinga Hiperxerófila
- Climate - semi arid - hot and dry
- Annual average temperature - 20.9 c
- Distance to Recife - 164 km
- Population - 24,736 (2022 Census)

== Economy ==
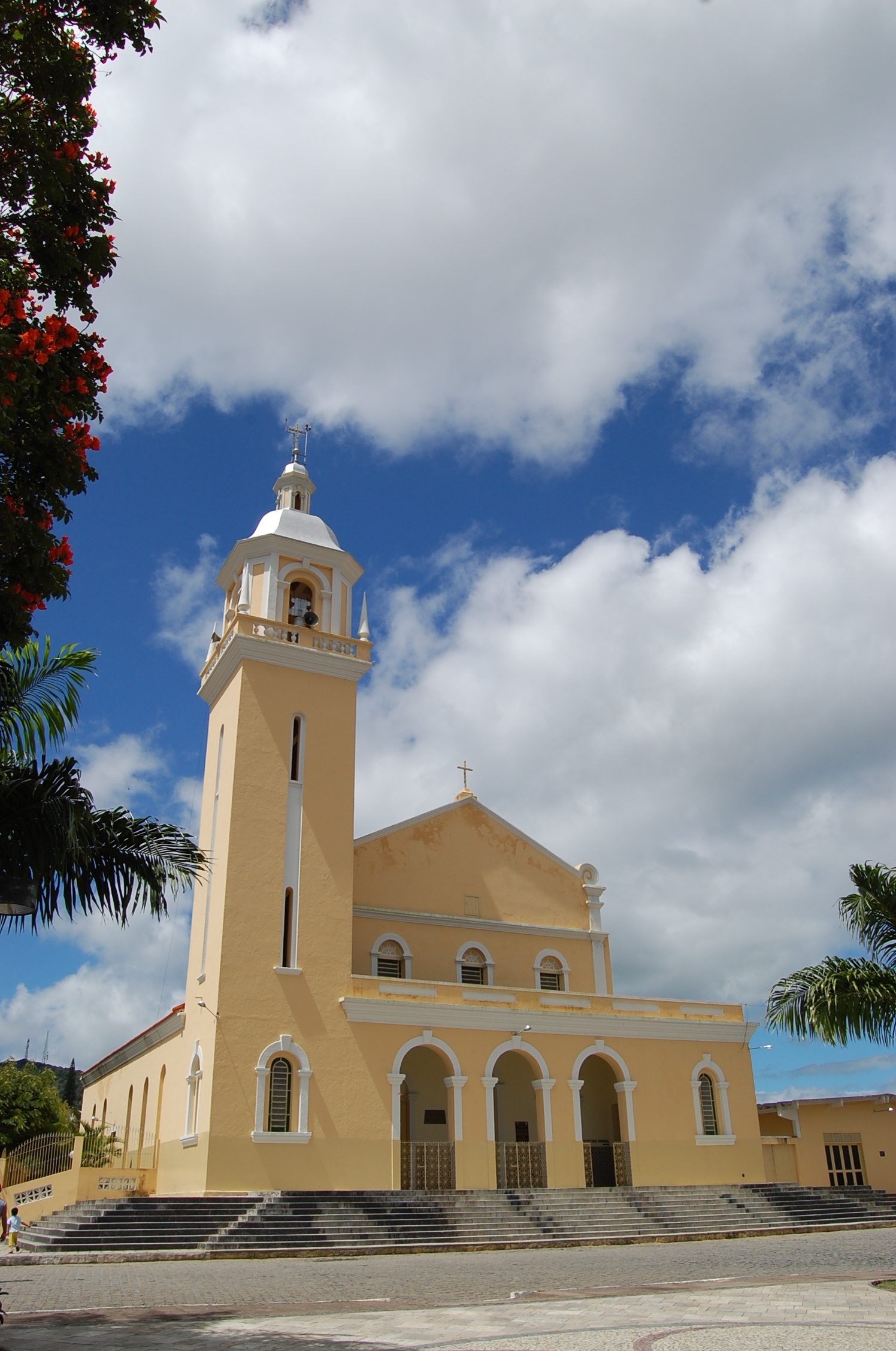
Santo Amaro Church

The main economic activities in Taquaritinga are based in textile industry, general commerce and agribusiness.

=== Economic Indicators ===
Population	GDP x(1000 R$).	GDP pc (R$)	PE
22.657	71.457	3.332	0.12%

Economy by Sector 2006

Primary sector	Secondary sector	Service sector
12.31%	11.30%	76.39%

=== Health Indicators ===
HDI (2000)	Hospitals (2007)	Hospitals beds (2007)	Children's Mortality every 1000 (2005)
0.688	1	56	15.1

== See also ==
- List of municipalities in Pernambuco
