= Riacho das Almas =

Municipality of Pernambuco, Brazil

- City
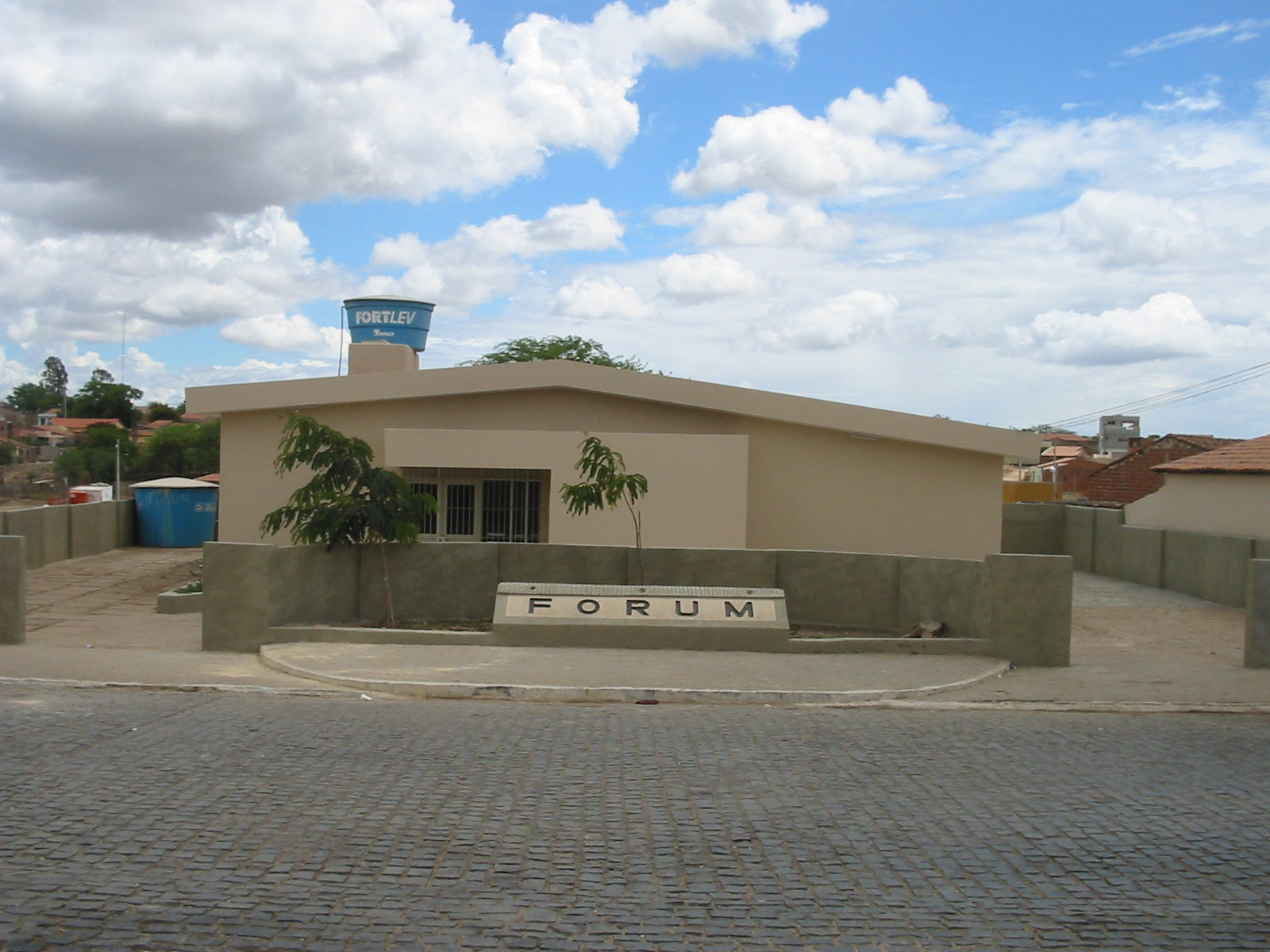
- City Forum

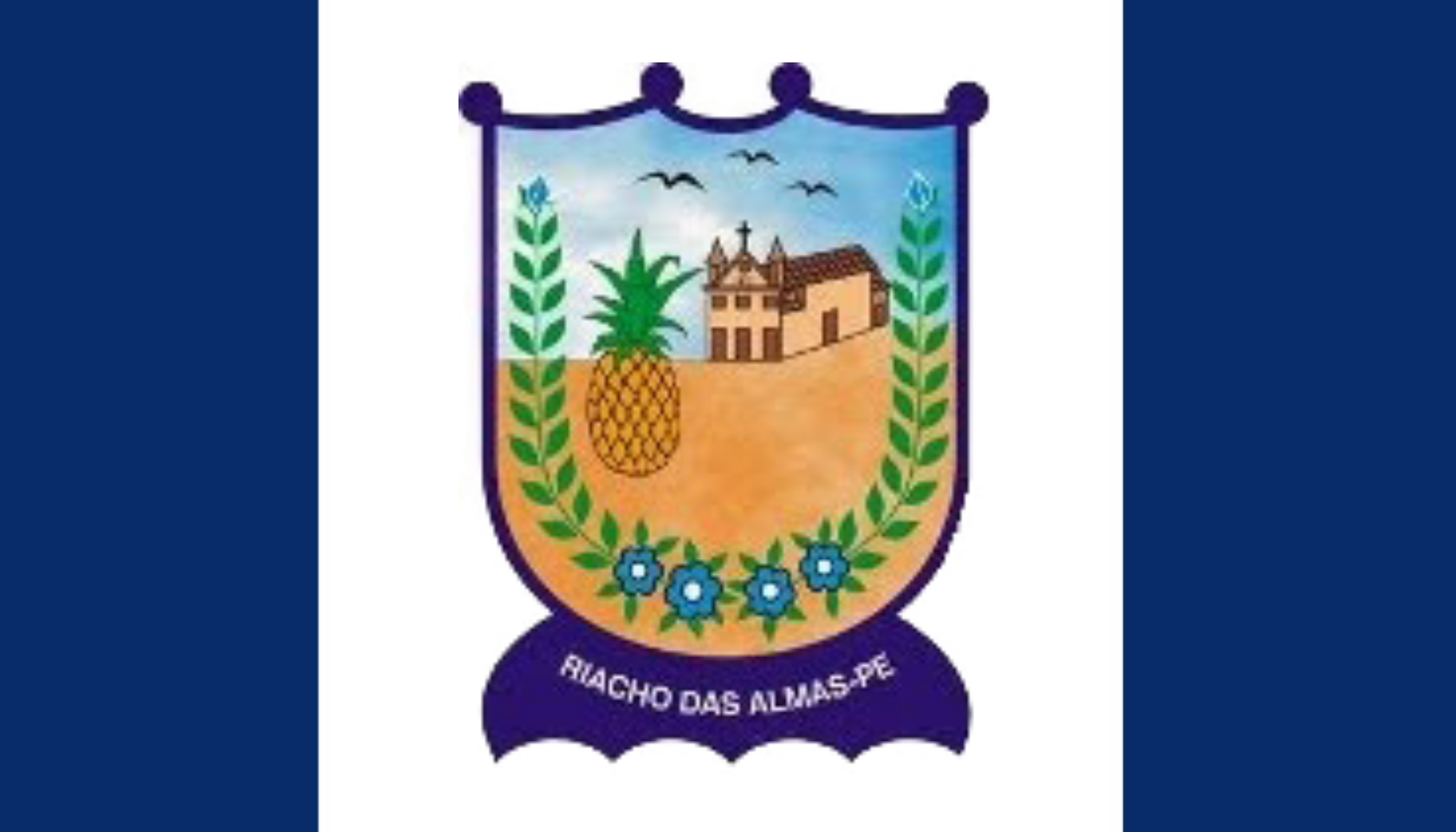
- Flag

- Riacho das Almas located in Brazil Map
- Coordinates: 8°8′S 35°52′W
- Country: Brazil
- State: Pernambuco
- Region: Agreste

Area
  - Total: 313.99 km^{2} (121.23 sq mi)
- Elevation: 407 m (1,335 ft)

Population (2022 Census)
  - Total: 20,639
  - Estimate (2025): 21,490
- Time zone: UTC−3 (BRT)

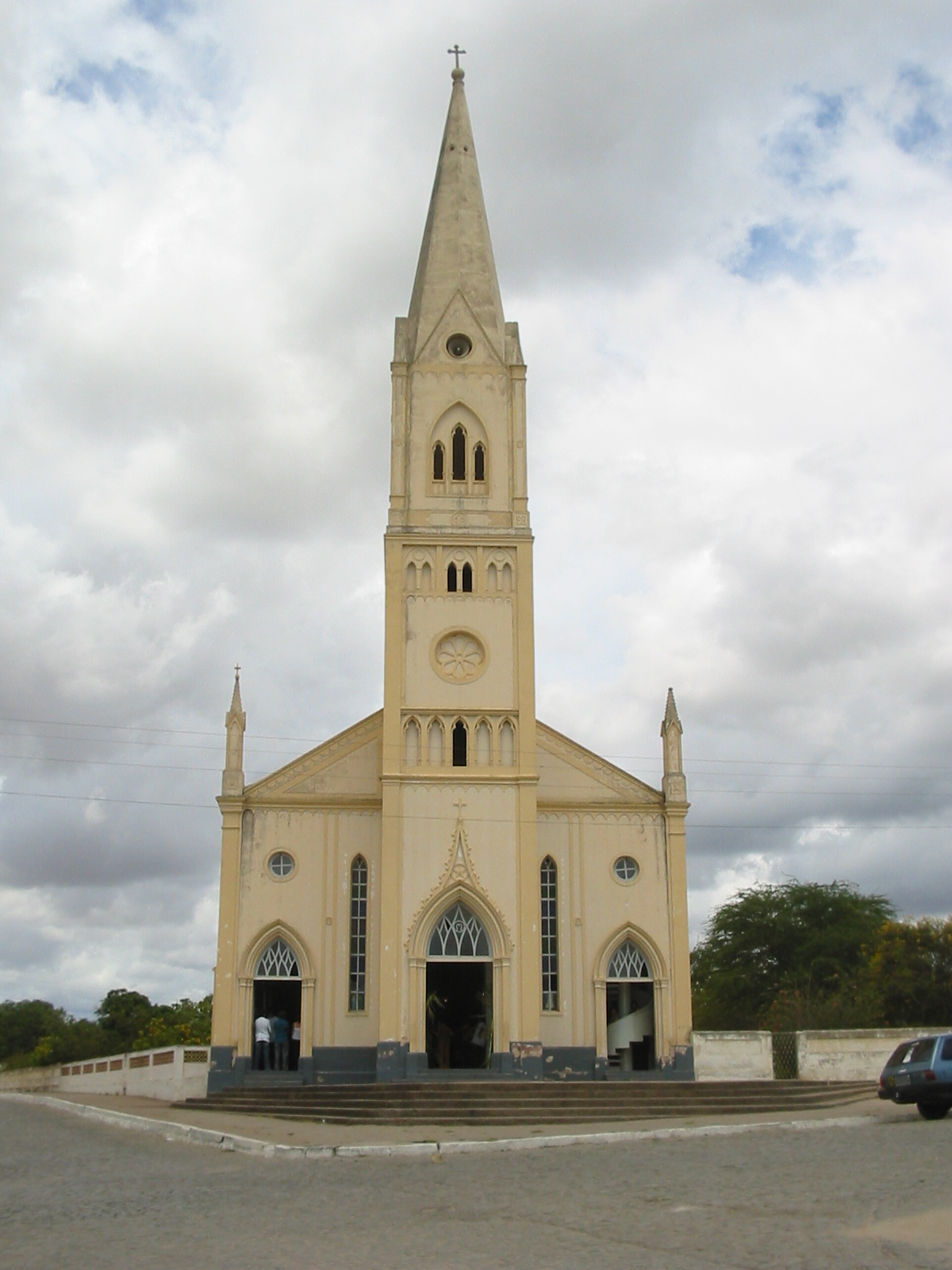
Our Lady of Conceição Church

Riacho das Almas (Central northeastern portuguese pronunciation: [hjˈɐʃŭ dɐˈzɐwmɐ]) (population 20,646) is a city in northeastern Brazil, in the State of Pernambuco. It lies in the mesoregion of Agreste of Pernambuco and has 313.99 sq/km of total area.

== Geography ==
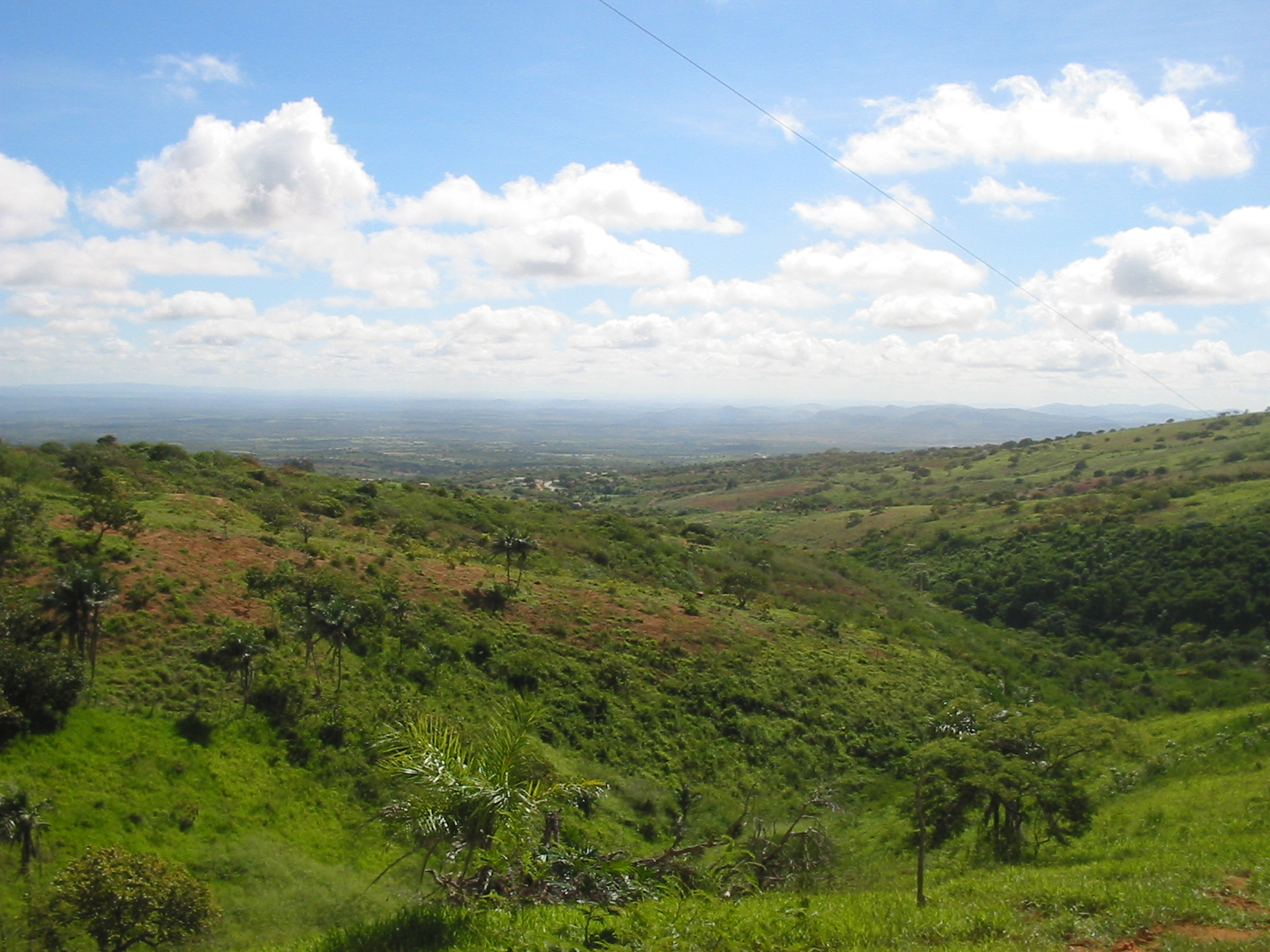
City overview after the rainy season

- State - Pernambuco
- Region - Agreste of Pernambuco
- Boundaries - Surubim and Frei Miguelinho (N); Caruaru (S and W); Bezerros and Cumaru (E).
- Area - 313.99 km^{2}
- Elevation - 407 m
- Hydrography - Capibaribe and Ipojuca rivers
- Vegetation - Caatinga hipoxerófila
- Annual average temperature - 23.6 c
- Distance to Recife - 152 km

== Economy ==
The main economic activities in Riacho das Almas are the textile industry and agribusiness, especially farming of cattle, goats, sheep, pigs, chickens; and plantations of pineapples and manioc.

=== Economic Indicators ===
Population	GDP x(1000 R$).	GDP pc (R$)	PE
18.930	62.157	3.402	0.10%

Economy by Sector (2006)

Primary sector	Secondary sector	Service sector
12.00%	9.46%	78.54%

=== Health Indicators ===
HDI (2000)	Hospitals (2007)	Hospitals beds (2007)	Children's Mortality every 1000 (2005)
0.609	1	29	10.3

== See also ==
- List of municipalities in Pernambuco
