= Riachão (São Bento) =

- Village
- Location within Brazil
- Coordinates: 6.467128°S 37.411795°W
- Country: Brazil
- State: Paraíba
- Municipality: São Bento
- Zona: Rural area

Population
  - Total: 742

Riachão (Portuguese Riachão) is a village near São Bento in Paraíba state, Brazil. With 742 inhabitants it is the largest settlement in the city.

== Etymology ==
Riachão (large stream). The Riachão name was given because of a stream that has the village out to the border of Paraíba and Rio Grande do Norte and in times of floods is filled to not exceed transport in any way.
