= São José =

São José is Portuguese for Saint Joseph, and often refers to:

- São José dos Campos, Brazil

São José may also refer to:

== Brazil ==
=== Alagoas ===
- São José da Laje
- São José da Tapera

=== Amapá ===
- São José dos Galibi

=== Bahia ===
- São José do Jacuípe
- São José da Vitória

=== Espírito Santo ===
- São José do Calçado

=== Maranhão ===
- São José dos Basílios
- São José de Ribamar

=== Mato Grosso ===
- São José do Povo
- São José dos Quatro Marcos
- São José do Rio Claro
- São José do Xingu

=== Minas Gerais ===
- São José do Alegre
- São José da Barra
- São José do Divino, Minas Gerais
- São José do Goiabal
- São José do Jacuri
- São José do Mantimento
- São José da Lapa
- São José da Safira
- São José da Varginha

=== Paraíba ===
- São José do Bonfim
- São José do Brejo do Cruz
- São José de Caiana
- São José dos Cordeiros
- São José de Espinharas
- São José da Lagoa Tapada
- São José de Piranhas
- São José de Princesa
- São José dos Ramos
- São José do Sabugi

=== Paraná ===
- São José da Boa Vista
- São José das Palmeiras
- São José dos Pinhais

=== Pernambuco ===
- São José do Belmonte
- São José da Coroa Grande
- São José do Egito

=== Piauí ===
- São José do Divino, Piauí
- São José do Peixe
- São José do Piauí

=== Rio de Janeiro ===
- São José de Ubá
- São José do Vale do Rio Preto

=== Rio Grande do Norte ===
- São José do Campestre
- São José de Mipibu
- São José do Seridó

=== Rio Grande do Sul ===
- São José dos Ausentes
- São José do Herval
- São José do Hortêncio
- São José do Inhacorá
- São José das Missões
- São José do Norte
- São José do Ouro

=== Sao Paulo ===
- São José, Paulínia
- São José do Barreiro
- São José da Bela Vista
- São José do Rio Pardo
- São José do Rio Preto

=== Santa Catarina ===
- São José, Santa Catarina
- São José do Cedro
- São José do Cerrito

== Portugal ==
- São José (Lisbon), a former civil parish in the municipality of Lisbon
- São José (Viseu), a civil parish in the municipality of Viseu
- São José (Ponta Delgada), a civil parish in the municipality of Ponta Delgada, Azores

== Sports ==
- São José Esporte Clube, a Brazilian football club
- São José Esporte Clube (women), a Brazilian women's football club
- Esporte Clube São José, a Brazilian football club
- Sociedade Esportiva e Recreativa São José, a Brazilian football club
- São José de Ribamar Esporte Clube, a Brazilian football club
- Associação Desportiva e Recreativa São José, a Brazilian football club

== Other uses ==
- Convent of São José, Lagoa (Algarve), Portugal, now the city's cultural centre
- São José Paquete Africa, a Portuguese slave ship shipwrecked in 1794 near Cape Town, South Africa

== See also ==
- San José (disambiguation)
