= San José (surname) =

San José is a Spanish surname. Notable people with the surname include:

- Beñat San José (born 1979), Spanish footballer and manager
- George L. San Jose, Cuban-American businessman
- Isidoro San José (born 1955), Spanish footballer
- Julie Anne San Jose (born 1994), Filipina singer
- Ken San Jose (born 2002), American dancer
- Lidia San José (born 1983), Spanish actress
- Marina San José (born 1983), Spanish actress
- Mikel San José (born 1989), Spanish footballer
- Paco San José (born 1958), Spanish musician, composer and educator
- Samuel San José (born 1984), Spanish footballer
- Teo San José (born 1958), Spanish artist, art therapist and writer

== See also ==
- San José (disambiguation)
- José (name)
