= San José =

San José or San Jose (Spanish for Saint Joseph) most often refers to:

- San Jose, California, US
- San José, Costa Rica, the nation's capital

San José or San Jose may also refer to:

== Places ==
=== Argentina ===
- San José, Buenos Aires
  - San José (Buenos Aires Underground), a railway station
  - San José vieja (Buenos Aires Underground), a ghost railway station
- San José, Santa María, Catamarca
- San José, Entre Ríos
- San José de Balcarce, Buenos Aires
- San José de Feliciano, Entre Ríos
- San José de Fray Mamerto Esquiú, Catamarca
- San José de Jáchal, San Juan
- San José de Metán, Salta
- Colonia San José, La Pampa

=== Belize ===
- San José, Orange Walk

=== Bolivia ===
- San José, Andrés Ibáñez
- San José de Chiquitos

=== Chile ===
- San José de la Mariquina
- San José de Maipo

=== Colombia ===
- San José de Albán, a town and municipality in the Nariño Department
- San José, Caldas, a town and municipality in the Caldas Department
- San José de Pare, a town and municipality in the Boyacá Department
- San José de Cúcuta, a city and municipality in Norte de Santander
- San José de la Fragua, a town and municipality in the Caquetá Department
- San José de las Lagunas, the seat of the Roberto Payán municipality in the Nariño Department
- San José de Ocune, a town and municipality in the Vichada Department
- San José del Guaviare, a town and municipality in the Guaviare Department
- Valle de San José, a town and municipality in the Santander Department

=== Costa Rica ===
- San José, Costa Rica, the capital of Costa Rica and of the province of San José, as well as a canton
  - Juan Santamaría International Airport (SJO)
- San José Province
- San José de Alajuela, a village and district in the canton of Alajuela in the province of Alajuela
- San José District, Grecia, a district in the canton of Grecia in the province of Alajuela
- San José District, Atenas, a district in the canton of Atenas in the province of Alajuela
- San José District, Naranjo, a district in the canton of Naranjo in the province of Alajuela
- San José District, Upala, a district in the canton of Upala in the province of Alajuela
- San José de la Montaña District, a district in the canton of Barva in the province of Heredia
- San José District, San Isidro, a district in the canton of San Isidro in the province of Heredia

=== Guatemala ===
- San José, Petén
- San José, Escuintla
- San José Acatempa
- San José Chacayá
- San José El Idolo
- San José La Arada
- San José Ojetenam
- San José Pinula
- San José Poaquil
- San José del Golfo
- Puerto San José

=== Honduras ===
- San José, La Paz
- San José, Copán

=== Mexico ===
- San José, Sonora, a place affected by Hurricane Paine
- San José del Cabo, Baja California Sur
- San José Iturbide, Guanajuato
- San José Villa de Allende, State of México
- San José Ayuquila, Oaxaca
- San José Chiltepec, Oaxaca
- San José Chinantequilla, Oaxaca
- San José del Pacífico, Oaxaca
- San José del Peñasco, Oaxaca
- San José del Progreso, Oaxaca
- San José Estancia Grande, Oaxaca
- San José Independencia, Oaxaca
- San José Lachiguirí, Oaxaca
- San José Tenango, Oaxaca
- San José Tzal, Yucatán

=== Panama ===
- David, Chiriquí or San José de David
- San José, Calobre, Veraguas
- San José, Cañazas, Veraguas
- San José, Los Santos
- San José, Panamá Oeste
- San José, San Francisco, Veraguas

=== Paraguay ===
- San José de los Arroyos
- San José Obrero

=== Philippines ===
- San Jose, Batangas
- San Jose, Camarines Sur
- San Jose, Dinagat Islands
- San Jose, Negros Oriental
- San Jose, Northern Samar
- San Jose, Nueva Ecija
- San Jose, Occidental Mindoro
- San Jose, Romblon
- San Jose, Tarlac
- San Jose de Buan, Samar
- San Jose de Buenavista, Antique
- San Jose del Monte, Bulacan
- San Jose Sico, Batangas, Batangas

=== Puerto Rico ===
- San José (Oriente), a sector of Oriente

=== Spain ===
- San José (Almería)
- San José del Valle, Cádiz
- Sant Josep de sa Talaia (municipality), Balearic Islands
  - Sant Josep de sa Talaia, a village in the municipality

=== United States ===
==== California ====
- San Jose, California, the largest city in the world named San Jose
  - Downtown San Jose, the business district
  - San Jose International Airport
- San Jose Township, Los Angeles County, California defunct
- San Jose Creek, a stream in Los Angeles County, California
- San Jose Creek (Monterey County, California), a stream
- San Jose Hills

==== Northern Mariana Islands ====
- San Jose, Tinian
- San Jose, Saipan village, a populated place in the Northern Mariana Islands

==== Other places in the United States ====
- San Jose, Arizona
- San Jose, Illinois
- San Jose, San Miguel County, New Mexico
- San Jose, Rio Arriba County, New Mexico

=== Uruguay ===
- San José de Mayo
- San José Department
- San José de Carrasco

=== Cuba ===
- San José de las Lajas

== Islands ==
- Weddell Island or Isla San José, Falkland Islands
- Isla San José (Baja California Sur), Mexico
- San José Island (Texas)
- Isla San José (Panama)

== Institutions and organizations ==
- Club San José, a Bolivian football team
- CD San José, a Spanish football team
- Mission San José (California), a historical Spanish mission Fremont, California, US
- Mission San José (Texas), a historical Spanish mission in Texas, US
- San Jose Earthquakes, an MLS soccer/football team
- San Jose Sharks, an NHL ice hockey team
- San Jose SaberCats, an AFL arena football team

== Colleges and universities ==
- San Jose Seminary, part of Ateneo de Manila University in Quezon City, Philippines
- San Jose State University, California, US
- University of San Jose–Recoletos, Cebu City, Philippines

== People ==
- San José (surname), Spanish language surname
- Chuki (footballer) (born 2004), real name Iván San José, Spanish footballer

== Other uses ==
- 6216 San Jose, an asteroid
- Palacio San José, a historical building and museum in Entre Ríos, Argentina
- San José Formation, a geological formation in Uruguay
- San José Mine, a mine in Copiapó, Chile
- San Jose River, a river in the Cariboo region of British Columbia, Canada
- San José Volcano, a volcano on the Chilean–Argentine border
- San José (galleon), a ship sunk during Wager's Action in 1708
- HMS San Josef (1797) or San José, a Spanish ship captured by the Royal Navy in 1797
- 2021 San Jose shooting, a mass shooting that killed ten people including the gunman

== See also ==
- Colegio San José (disambiguation)
- Colonia San José (disambiguation)
- Saint Joseph (disambiguation)
- São José (disambiguation)
- San Giuseppe (disambiguation)
- Sankt Josef
