= 2026–27 Fencing World Cup =

International fencing competition

- Edition: 56th Fencing World Cup
- Duration: September 2026 – March 2027
- Organiser: FIE

The 56th FIE Fencing World Cup event began in September 2026 and will conclude in March 2027.

== Senior ==
=== Men's individual épée ===
Color key

- World Cup

Date	Event	Type	Gold	Silver	Bronze
15 October 2026	Coupe du Monde, Casablanca	World Cup	Mate Tamas Koch (HUN)	Matteo Galassi (ITA)	Gergely Kovacs (HUN); Koki Kano (JPN)
12 November 2026	Coupe du Monde, Berne	World Cup	Gergely Siklosi (HUN)	Matteo Galassi (ITA)	Kendrick Jean Joseph (FRA); Vadim Sharlaimov (KAZ)

=== Women's individual épée ===
Color key

- World Cup

Date	Event	Type	Gold	Silver	Bronze
16 October 2026	Coupe du Monde, Casablanca	World Cup	Roberta Marzani (ITA)	Anna Maksymenko (UKR)	Alberta Santuccio (ITA); Aizanat Murtazaeva (RUS)
13 November 2026	Coupe du Monde, Wuxi	World Cup	Alberta Santuccio (ITA)	Song Se-ra (KOR)	Eszter Muhari (HUN); Auriane Mallo-Breton (FRA)

=== Men's individual foil ===
Color key

- World Cup

Date	Event	Type	Gold	Silver	Bronze
15 October 2026	Coupe du Monde, Takamatsu City	World Cup	Alexander Choupenitch (CZE)	Maxime Pauty (FRA)	Guilherme Toldo (BRA); Toshiya Saito (JPN)
13 November 2026	Coupe du Monde, Plovdiv	World Cup	Kirill Borodachev (RUS)	Tommaso Marini (ITA)	Alexander Massialas (USA); Kazuki IImura (JPN)

=== Women's individual foil ===
Color key

- World Cup

Date	Event	Type	Gold	Silver	Bronze
16 October 2026	Coupe du Monde, Takamatsu City	World Cup	Martina Favaretto (ITA)	Martina Batini (ITA)	Alice Volpi (ITA); Arianna Errigo (ITA)
12 November 2026	Coupe du Monde, Plovdiv	World Cup	Anna Cristino (ITA)	Aurora Grandis (ITA)	Martina Favaretto (ITA); Lauren Scruggs (USA)

=== Men's individual sabre ===
Color key

- World Cup

Date	Event	Type	Gold	Silver	Bronze
15 October 2026	Coupe du Monde, Oran	World Cup	Sandro Bazadze (GEO)	Krisztian Rabb (HUN)	Colin Heathcock (USA); Mao Kokubo (JPN)
13 November 2026	Coupe du Monde, Cairo	World Cup	Ahmed Hesham (EGY)	Pavel Graudyn (RUS)	Fares Ferjani (TUN); Darii Lukashenko (USA)

=== Women's individual sabre ===
Color key

- World Cup

Date	Event	Type	Gold	Silver	Bronze
16 October 2026	Coupe du Monde, Oran	World Cup	Toscane Tori (FRA)	Yoana Ilieva (BUL)	Magda Skarbonkiewicz (USA); Lucia Martin-Portugues (ESP)
12 November 2026	Coupe du Monde, Cairo	World Cup	Maia Chamberlain (USA)	Larissa Eifler (GER)	Sugar Katinka Battai (HUN); Despina Georgiadou (GRE)

=== Men's team épée ===
Color key

- World Cup

Date	Event	Type	Gold	Silver	Bronze
18 October 2026	Coupe du Monde par équipes, Casablanca	World Cup	Kazakhstan	Russia	France
14 November 2026	Coupe du Monde par équipes, Berne	World Cup	Hungary	Switzerland	Italy

=== Women's team épée ===
Color key

- World Cup

Date	Event	Type	Gold	Silver	Bronze
18 October 2026	Coupe du Monde par équipes, Casablanca	World Cup	Russia	Italy	Estonia
15 November 2026	Coupe du Monde par équipes, Wuxi	World Cup	Hungary	France	Ukraine

=== Men's team foil ===
Color key

- World Cup

Date	Event	Type	Gold	Silver	Bronze
18 October 2026	Coupe du Monde par équipes, Takamatsu City	World Cup	Russia	Japan	Italy
15 November 2026	Coupe du Monde par équipes, Plovdiv	World Cup	Italy	Russia	Japan

=== Women's team foil ===
Color key

- World Cup

Date	Event	Type	Gold	Silver	Bronze
18 October 2026	Coupe du Monde par équipes, Takamatsu City	World Cup	Italy	Canada	France
15 November 2026	Coupe du Monde par équipes, Plovdiv	World Cup	Italy	France	Hungary

=== Men's team sabre ===
Color key

- World Cup

Date	Event	Type	Gold	Silver	Bronze
18 October 2026	Coupe du Monde par équipes, Oran	World Cup	France	Japan	Russia
15 November 2026	Coupe du Monde par équipes, Cairo	World Cup	South Korea	Romania	France

=== Women's team sabre ===
Color key

- World Cup

Date	Event	Type	Gold	Silver	Bronze
18 October 2026	Coupe du Monde par équipes, Oran	World Cup	Hungary	China	France
15 November 2026	Coupe du Monde par équipes, Cairo	World Cup	South Korea	France	Hong Kong

== Junior ==
=== Men's individual épée ===
Color key

- World Cup

Date	Event	Type	Gold	Silver	Bronze
26 September 2026	Coupe du Monde, San Salvador	World Cup	Ethan Chung (CAN)	Jackson Fan (CAN)	Chen Bing-Jyun (TPE); Michael Zhao Junyi (CAN)
10 October 2026	Coupe du Monde, Hong Kong	World Cup	Zou Cenxuan (CHN)	Arkadiy Marinenko (RUS)	Wout Van Laecke (BEL); Anthony Ho Shing Fung (HKG)
23 October 2026	Coupe du Monde, San Jose	World Cup	Jackson Fan (CAN)	Daniel Chirashnya (USA)	Andy Liu ZiCheng (CAN); Elijah Imrek (USA)
6 November 2026	Coupe du Monde, Manama	World Cup	Eslam Osama (EGY)	Ho Shing Fung (HKG)	Carlos Alexander Romero Kuri Roca (MEX); Younis Khalil (EGY)

=== Women's individual épée ===
Color key

- World Cup

Date	Event	Type	Gold	Silver	Bronze
25 September 2026	Coupe du Monde, San Salvador	World Cup	Xu Tai Yang (CAN)	Catherine Witter (USA)	Luca Balazs (CAN); Lv Xi Er (CAN)
9 October 2026	Coupe du Monde, Hong Kong	World Cup	Elle Meihui Koh (SGP)	Ng Yuen Lam (HKG)	Sofia Barsukova (RUS); Wat Chok Weng (SGP)
24 October 2026	Coupe du Monde, San Jose	World Cup	Chloe Tolsma (USA)	Vivian Young (USA)	Regina Lee (USA); Scarlett Lee (USA)
7 November 2026	Coupe du Monde, Manama	World Cup	Maya Kozlowski (USA)	Ng Yuen Lam (HKG)	Shoong Tak Sum (HKG); Sanam Nazarova (UZB)

=== Men's individual foil ===
Color key

- World Cup

Date	Event	Type	Gold	Silver	Bronze
25 September 2026	Coupe du Monde, Samsun	World Cup	Roy Graham (USA)	Bob Cheng (HKG)	Lu Youshi (CHN); Lin Youlong (CHN)
9 October 2026	Coupe du Monde, Lima	World Cup	Aris Kiayias (CYP)	Franco Marchetti (ARG)	Aden Austin Soto-Ulev (MEX); Francisco Naranjo (CHI)
23 October 2026	Coupe du Monde, Hammamet	World Cup	Mahel Boumaza (FRA)	Emanuele Iaquinta (ITA)	Viacheslav Golovachev (RUS); Guillaume Watson (FRA)
7 November 2026	Coupe du Monde, Budapest	World Cup	Roy Graham (USA)	Mahel Boumaza (FRA)	Lin Youlong (CHN); Lau Tsun Yin (HKG)

=== Women's individual foil ===
Color key

- World Cup

Date	Event	Type	Gold	Silver	Bronze
26 September 2026	Coupe du Monde, Samsun	World Cup	Jaelyn Liu (USA)	Wang Yiran (CHN)	Sara Amr Hossny (EGY); Natasza Kus (POL)
10 October 2026	Coupe du Monde, Lima	World Cup	Adeline Senic (MDA)	Sveva Federici (ITA)	Florentine Grund (GER); Elizaveta Kopyltsova (CYP)
24 October 2026	Coupe du Monde, Hammamet	World Cup	Adeline Senic (MDA)	Ludovica Franzoni (ITA)	Sofiya Dzobaeva (RUS); Salma Ahmed (AUS)
7 November 2026	Coupe du Monde, Aix-en-Provence	World Cup	Caterina Fedeli (USA)	Adeline Senic (MDA)	Chloe Chan (HKG); Lavender Lee (USA)

=== Men's individual sabre ===
Color key

- World Cup

Date	Event	Type	Gold	Silver	Bronze
26 September 2026	Coupe du Monde, Bogota	World Cup	Vince Liu (BRA)	Lucas Zhao Pinxuan (CHN)	Marcus Pinto (BRA); Arthur Wolff (BRA)
9 October 2026	Coupe du Monde, Tashkent	World Cup	Alpamis Urakbaev (UZB)	Riccardo Maria Aquili (ITA)	Daniel Berkeszi (HUN); Ivan Novikov (RUS)
23 October 2026	Coupe du Monde, Oran	World Cup	Furkan Yaman (TUR)	Candeniz Berrak (TUR)	Massimo Sibillo (ITA); Louis Garrigue (FRA)
7 November 2026	Coupe du Monde, Dormagen	World Cup	Daniel Holz (USA)	Valerio Reale (ITA)	Leonard Weber (GER); Kuang Li (CHN)

=== Women's individual sabre ===
Color key

- World Cup

Date	Event	Type	Gold	Silver	Bronze
26 September 2026	Coupe du Monde, Bogota	World Cup	Delilah Huai (USA)	Stella Santos (BRA)	Ana Beatriz Fraga (BRA); Venorica Tissone (COL)
10 October 2026	Coupe du Monde, Tashkent	World Cup	Anfisa Gromova (RUS)	Flavia Astolfi (ITA)	Vittoria Mocci (ITA); Ekaterina Mironova (RUS)
23 October 2026	Coupe du Monde, Oran	World Cup	Vittoria Mocci (ITA)	Tsang Yuet Ching (HKG)	Alla Aidarova (RUS); Anfisa Gromova (RUS)
7 November 2026	Coupe du Monde, Budapest	World Cup	Martina Fernandez (USA)	Evelyn Jiang (USA)	Anastasia Fusea (ROU); Vittoria Mocci (ITA)

=== Men's team épée ===
Color key

- World Cup

Date	Event	Type	Gold	Silver	Bronze
27 September 2026	Coupe du Monde par équipes, San Salvador	World Cup	Canada	China	Mexico
11 October 2026	Coupe du Monde par équipes, Hong Kong	World Cup	Russia	China	Hong Kong
25 October 2026	Coupe du Monde par équipes, San Jose	World Cup	United States	Canada	Brazil
8 November 2026	Coupe du Monde par équipes, Manama	World Cup	Hong Kong	Chinese Taipei	Egypt

=== Women's team épée ===
Color key

- World Cup

Date	Event	Type	Gold	Silver	Bronze
27 September 2026	Coupe du Monde par équipes, San Salvador	World Cup	Canada	Mexico	Chile
11 October 2026	Coupe du Monde par équipes, Hong Kong	World Cup	Hong Kong	Russia	China
25 October 2026	Coupe du Monde par équipes, San Jose	World Cup	United States	China	Canada
8 November 2026	Coupe du Monde par équipes, Manama	World Cup	Hong Kong	Egypt	Chinese Taipei

=== Men's team foil ===
Color key

- World Cup

Date	Event	Type	Gold	Silver	Bronze
27 September 2026	Coupe du Monde par équipes, Samsun	World Cup	Canada	Hong Kong	Russia
11 October 2026	Coupe du Monde par équipes, Lima	World Cup	Argentina	Brazil	Peru
25 October 2026	Coupe du Monde par équipes, Hammamet	World Cup	Italy	Russia	China
8 November 2026	Coupe du Monde par équipes, Budapest	World Cup	Canada	France	Italy

=== Women's team foil ===
Color key

- World Cup

Date	Event	Type	Gold	Silver	Bronze
27 September 2026	Coupe du Monde par équipes, Samsun	World Cup	United States	Russia	China
11 October 2026	Coupe du Monde par équipes, Lima	World Cup	Brazil	Peru	Argentina
25 October 2026	Coupe du Monde par équipes, Hammamet	World Cup	Russia	Hungary	Italy
8 November 2026	Coupe du Monde par équipes, Aix-en-Provence	World Cup	China	United States	Hungary

=== Men's team sabre ===
Color key

- World Cup

Date	Event	Type	Gold	Silver	Bronze
27 September 2026	Coupe du Monde par équipes, Bogota	World Cup	Brazil	Venezuela	Puerto Rico
11 October 2026	Coupe du Monde par équipes, Tashkent	World Cup	Russia	Uzbekistan	Italy
25 October 2026	Coupe du Monde par équipes, Oran	World Cup	Turkey	Italy	Russia
8 November 2026	Coupe du Monde par équipes, Dormagen	World Cup	United States	France	Italy

=== Women's team sabre ===
Color key

- World Cup

Date	Event	Type	Gold	Silver	Bronze
27 September 2026	Coupe du Monde par équipes, Bogota	World Cup	Brazil	Venezuela	Colombia
11 October 2026	Coupe du Monde par équipes, Tashkent	World Cup	Russia	Italy	Uzbekistan
25 October 2026	Coupe du Monde par équipes, Oran	World Cup	Russia	Italy	Egypt
8 November 2026	Coupe du Monde par équipes, Budapest	World Cup	China	Italy	Hungary
