= Daniel Kroneberger =

Argentine politician (born 1961)

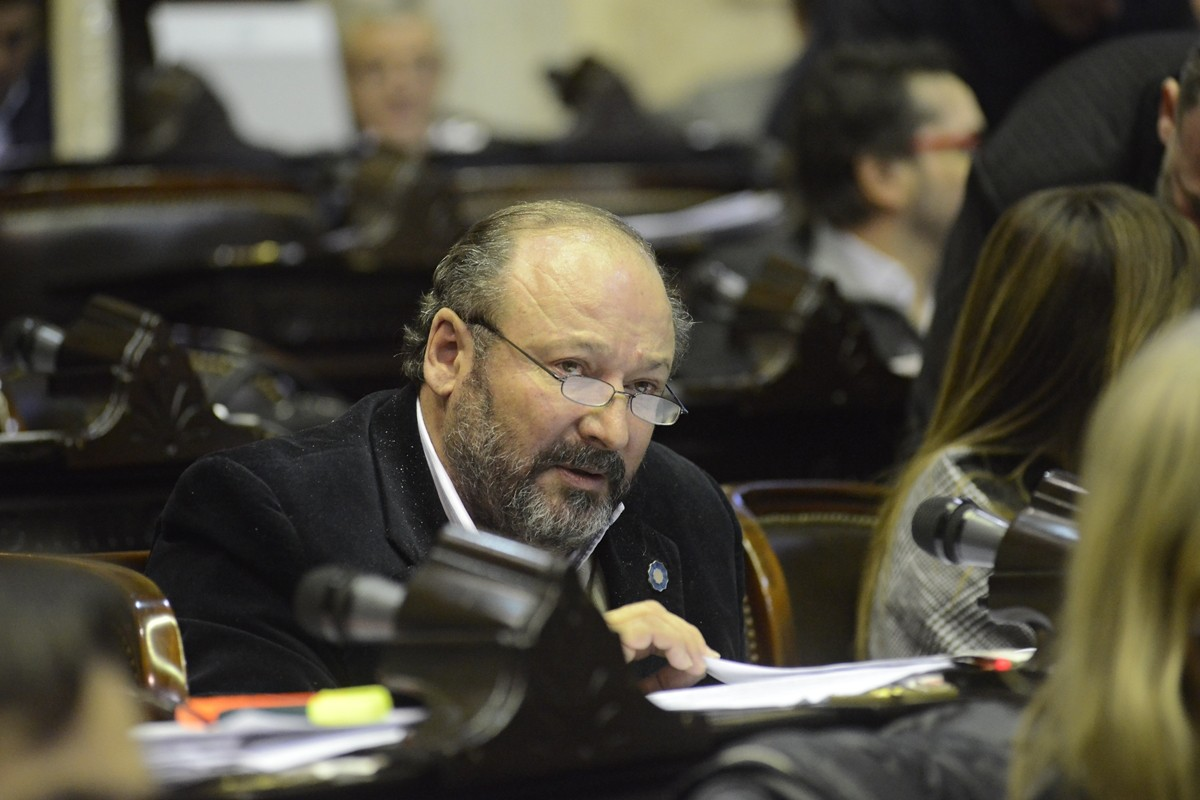

National Senator
- Incumbent
- Assumed office 10 December 2021
- Constituency: La Pampa

National Deputy
- In office 10 December 2011 – 10 December 2019
- Constituency: La Pampa
- In office 10 December 2005 – 10 December 2009
- Constituency: La Pampa

Mayor of Colonia Barón
- In office 10 December 1995 – 10 December 2005
- Succeeded by: René Dolce

Personal details
- Born: 12 June 1961 (age 65) General Pico, Argentina
- Party: Radical Civic Union
- Other political affiliations: Alliance (1997–2001); Pampa Civic and Social Front (2007–2017); Juntos por el Cambio (2017–present)

Daniel Ricardo Kroneberger (born 12 June 1961) is an Argentine politician, currently serving as a National Senator for La Pampa since 2021. He belongs to the Radical Civic Union (UCR). Kroneberger previously served two non-consecutive terms as a National Deputy elected in La Pampa, from 2005 to 2009 and from 2011 to 2019. Prior to that, he served as intendente of Colonia Barón, a rural community in La Pampa, for ten years from 1995 to 2005.

== Early life ==
Kroneberger was born on 12 June 1961 in General Pico, La Pampa, to a family descended from Volga Germans. Due to his heritage, Kroneberger is sometimes referred to as el Ruso. In 1979, Kroneberger completed his technician's degree on electro-mechanics at the Colonia Barón technical school. He would later become politically active as a member of the Radical Civic Union, inspired by the leadership and later presidential victory of Raúl Alfonsín.

== Mayor of Colonia Barón ==
Kroneberger first ran for the position of intendente (mayor) of Colonia Barón in the 1987 elections, aged 26. He finished second in the vote, losing against the Justicialist Party candidate. Eight years later, in 1995, he ran again and won with over 50% of the vote. He was re-elected in 1999 and in 2003, both times with margins surpassing 70% of the vote.

== Career in Congress ==
=== First term as deputy ===
His position as a popular mayor allowed him to run in the Radical Civic Union primaries ahead of the 2005 legislative elections, where three of La Pampa's five seats in the Chamber of Deputies were at stake. Kroneberger was the first candidate in his primary list, followed by María del Carmen Campos, former PAMI delegate in La Pampa. Kroneberger and Campos's list won in the primaries, held on 9 August 2005, with 5,784 votes and 45.17% of the vote – a considerable distance from the second-most voted list, headed by former national agriculture secretary Antonio Tomás Berhongaray.

In the general election, held on 23 October, the Justicialist Party prevailed over the UCR. The Justicialist list, headed by Manuel Justo Balandrón and Marta Lucía Osorio, received 34.94% of the votes and won two seats against Kroneberger's 31.27%, which granted his list a single seat. Despite the loss, the 2005 election represented the best results for the UCR in La Pampa since the 1985 elections.

On 5 July 2008, Kroneberger was one of the deputies who voted against President Cristina Fernández de Kirchner's proposed agricultural tax reform, citing his need to "defend the jobs" of his province's rural constituents. The law would eventually pass the Chamber of Deputies vote, but was narrowly struck down by the Senate. The following year, despite his intention to run for re-election, he accepted stepping down from the UCR primaries in favour of Ulises Forte's list. Following the end of his term as deputy on 10 December 2009, he briefly retired from politics and worked in the private sector.

=== Second and third terms ===
Kroneberger ran for a second time as deputy within the FrePam alliance in the 2011 legislative election. In the PASO primaries, Kroneberger's "Integración" list won with 17,256 votes against the second-most voted list, Ricardo Consiglio's "Juntos por La Pampa", which received 12,211 votes. In the general election, Kroneberger's list was the second-most voted, once again losing by a wide margin against the Justicialist Party's list (in coalition with the Front for Victory, although both lists produced only one elected deputy: Kroneberger for the FrePam, and María Luz Alonso for the PJ–FPV. The two were sworn in on 10 December 2011.

A few weeks after taking office as deputy, Kroneberger was hospitalised at the Hospital Italiano de Buenos Aires, where he was diagnosed with leukemia. After taking a leave from his legislative positions for the following months, he announced his treatment had been successful in October 2012 and he returned to Congress for the remainder of his term. In 2012, he was elected as president of the Provincial Committee of the UCR.

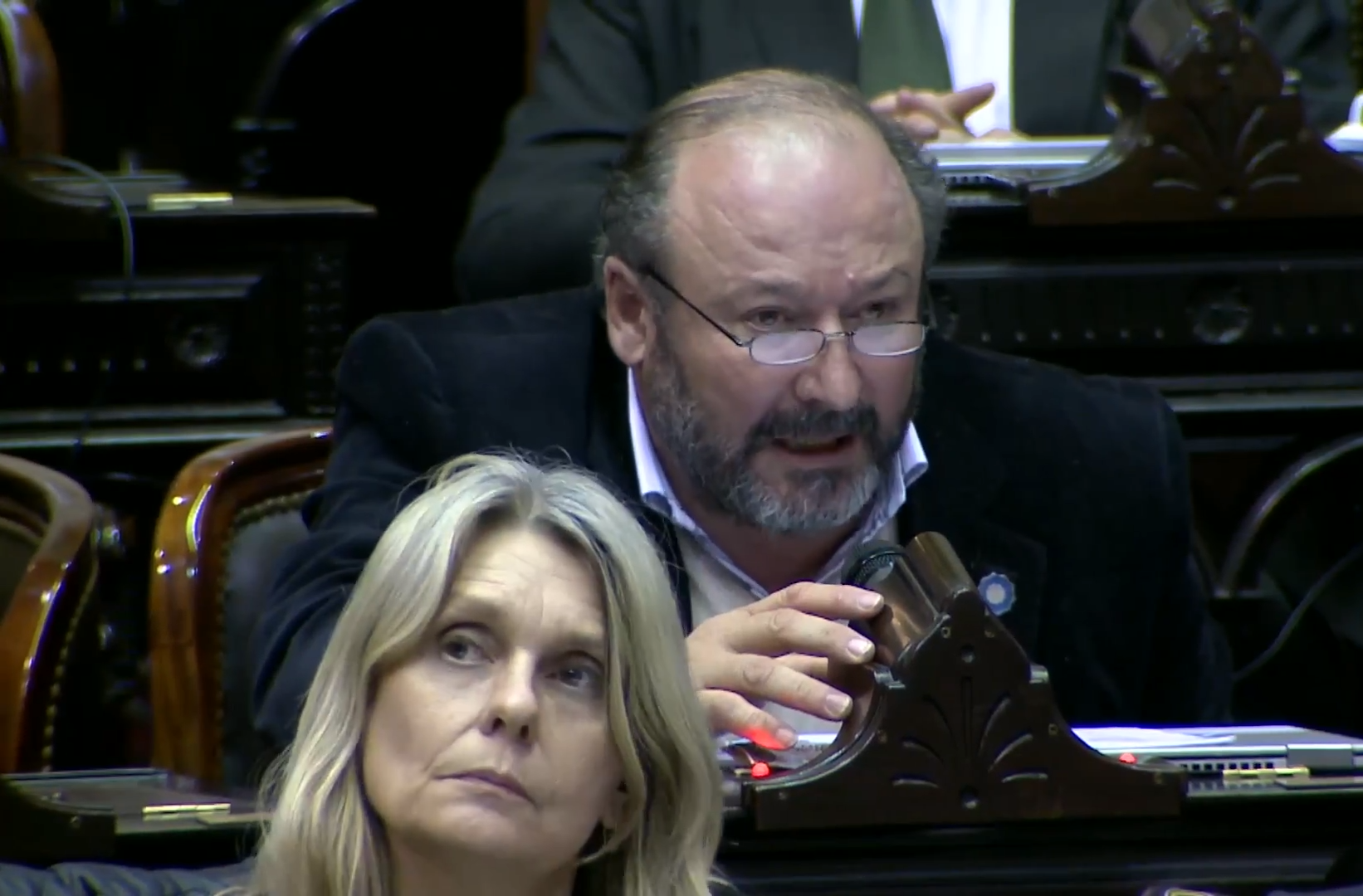
Kroneberger during the 2018 vote on the Voluntary Interruption of Pregnancy Bill.

Ahead of the 2015 legislative election, Kroneberger ran for a third term as deputy, once again competing in the open primaries within the FrePam alliance alongside Alicia Iris Ziegenfuhs as part of the "Juntos por La Pampa" list. Kroneberger and Ziegenfuhs's list won with 38,737 votes and 54.22% of the vote against the "Cambiemos La Pampa" list of Martín Miguel Ardoahín and Paulina Lescano. Despite winning, Ardohaín and Lescano's list received enough votes to earn a seat in the final FrePam list, which was made up of Kroneberger and Lescano. Kroneberger was eventually re-elected to a third term with 39.64% of the vote against the Justicialist Party's 46.11%. During his 2015–2019 term, despite improvements in his health condition, Kroneberger was the ninth most-absent member of the Chamber, participating in only 14 out or 46 parliamentary sessions during the first half of 2018.

In June 2018, ahead of the Chamber's vote on the Voluntary Interruption of Pregnancy Bill – which sought to legalise abortion in Argentina, Kroneberger was still considered among the "undecided" deputies within the governing Cambiemos alliance. On 11 June, he stated he would probably vote in favour of the bill. During the Chamber vote, Kroneberger began his speech by stating his position was based on the "importance of trying to protect both lives", earning applause from pro-life legislators; Kroneberger immediately followed by explaining that was his reasoning for voting in favour of decriminalising abortion. His favourable vote contributed to the Chamber of Deputies greenlighting the bill, although the measure was later rejected by the Senate in August 2018.

=== National senator ===
In the 2021 legislative election, Kroneberger ran for one of La Pampa's three seats in the Argentine Senate. He competed in the Juntos por el Cambio primaries heading the "Unidos por La Pampa" list alongside PRO youth leader María Victoria Huala; Kroneberger and Huala's list received 45,343 votes and 47.77% of the vote, winning against the four rival lists and securing both candidates' positions in the Juntos por el Cambio list in the general election. In the general election, Juntos por el Cambio won with 48.25% of the vote against the Frente de Todos's 42.21%, the first time in decades that the Justicialist Party lost a nationwide election in the province. Both Kroneberger and Huala were sworn in on 10 December 2021.
