= Colonia San José =

Colonia San José may refer to:

- Colonia San José, Chihuahua, Mexico
- Colonia San José, Jujuy, Argentina
- Colonia San José, La Pampa, Argentina
- Colonia San José, Santa Fe, Argentina

== See also ==
- San José (disambiguation)
