= Quemú Quemú Department =

Quemú Quemú Department Departamento Quemú Quemú
- Location of Quemú Quemú Department within La Pampa Province

- Location within La Pampa Province Location within Argentina
- Coordinates: 36.1°S 63.6°W
- Country: Argentina
- Province: La Pampa
- Capital: Quemú Quemú

Area
  - Total: 2,557 km^{2} (987 sq mi)

Population (2022)
  - Total: 8,460
  - Density: 3.31/km^{2} (8.57/sq mi)

Quemú Quemú Department is one of the 22 departments in La Pampa Province. The capital city of the department is Quemú Quemú.

== Places in Quemú Quemú Department ==
- Colonia Barón
