= The San Jose Group =

- Type: Private
- Industry: Advertising, Marketing, Consulting, Public Relations.
- Founded: 1981; 45 years ago
- Headquarters: Chicago, Illinois, U.S.
- Key people: George L. San Jose (president & Chief Creative Officer); Alexander L. San Jose (executive vice president – digital)
- Products: Advertising, Consulting and Public relations
- Website: thesanjosegroup.com

The San Jose Group Co. (SJG) is a privately held marketing and advertising agency based in Chicago. The agency was founded by George L. San Jose in 1981. SJG is a member of the San Jose Network Ltd., which operates 28 offices in 15 countries, serving 32 markets across the U.S. and Latin America. The agency works in conjunction with Synergage, San Jose Consulting (SJC), and SJ Public Relations (SJPR).

== History ==
SJG was founded and named after George L. San Jose in 1981. The agency's first office was located in Chicago on Jackson Blvd., and in 1988, it moved its offices to Michigan Ave—an avenue well known for housing some of the top advertising agencies in Chicago. The agency was among the first Hispanic agencies to operate on the national level and used a lifestyle consumer-centric behavioral approach towards creating universal Spanish messaging with local nuances — versus specific regional dialects—to ensure clear and culturally relevant communication with the consumer.

George L. San Jose, the founder and CEO of The San Jose Group (SJG), began his career in 1981 with only $247, which he used to purchase a used desk and office chair. His beginning marked the start of an advertising company that has grown to become one of the largest minority-owned advertising agencies in the United States. This company, that started up with $247, reported $55 million in billings by 2007.

In 1988, SJG established San Jose Consulting, the first Hispanic Marketing Consulting Group, to identify and quantify share growth opportunities for U.S. Fortune 1000 Clients.

In 1990, George founded SJ Public Relations to serve as a separate division and support The San Jose Group's clients with their marketing communications services.

In 1991, George founded The San Jose Network (SJN) to provide services to U.S.-based corporations seeking expansion and growth opportunities in the markets of Latin America. Headquartered in Chicago, SJN's conglomerate of best-in-class independent advertising and marketing communications agencies offered a convenient one-stop-shop approach to serve the distinct local markets that make up Latin America.

In 1999, the company changed its name from San Jose & Associates Inc. to The San Jose Group Co.

In 2003, The San Jose Group's billings grew 36.5% which made it the third fastest growing agency in Chicago.

=== 1980s ===
In 1981, San Jose & Associates (SJ&A) was established as a full-service agency focusing on the national Hispanic market. The agency was selected to handle advertising for Aeroperú, Allstate Insurance, Anheuser-Busch's regional promotions, Chanty Inc., and Deluxe Ice Cream Co. SJ&A employed "Universal Spanish" to address the linguistic regional diversity among Spanish-speaking audiences and aimed to fill gaps in national Hispanic advertising.

In 1982, Shasta Beverages retained San Jose & Associates to manage Shasta Beverages first Hispanic marketing and advertising campaign for Capri-Sun in the U.S. The campaign promoted Capri-Sun, a juice-based drink in flexible foil pouches, which was positioned as a "Fun Drink" for children and mothers. The agency's work involved advertising, promotion, and public relations to support the product's launch and distribution in various U.S. markets.

In 1983, San Jose & Associates was appointed by the Coca-Cola Bottling Co. to coordinate a regional public relations campaign targeting Hispanic consumers. The campaign included community and special events such as parades, fundraisers, and the International Battle of the DJs in Chicago. That same year, Zayre Corp. appointed San Jose & Associates as counsel on public relations programs aimed at the Hispanic market. The agency was responsible for program recommendations, community service, special events, and promotions.

In 1984, Anheuser-Busch appointed San Jose & Associates to handle Hispanic sales promotion and marketing services for the Chicago area. The agency was tasked with planning merchandising programs, sports sponsorships, and community events. The agency was responsible for activities related to the promotion of Anheuser-Busch beers, including Budweiser, Bud Light and Michelob.

In 1985, San Jose & Associates played a notable role in the expanding Chicago Hispanic market. The agency worked on projects including creative, media buying, marketing, and research, making it a key Hispanic agency in the region. The agency's total capitalized billings in 1984 were $3.1 million, with a projected increase to $3.7 million for 1985. San Jose & Associates was retained by Anheuser-Busch Inc. to develop and place print and broadcast advertisements for Budweiser and Michelob in the Chicago regional Hispanic market. The estimated $1 million campaign was scheduled to launch in early June.

San Jose & Associates was selected by WIND-AM to handle advertising, promotions, and public relations in 1987. The agency was also tasked by S.C. Johnson & Sons to create TV, radio, and promotional materials for the launch of Future floor wax in the Miami market. Additionally, San Jose & Associates managed the first advertising campaign for S.C. Johnson & Son's Soft Sense skin lotion, which was introduced with radio and TV spots on the West Coast.

In 1987, San Jose & Associates was appointed by the Chicago White Sox to handle Hispanic promotion and public relations activities.

In 1988, San Jose & Associates was appointed by S.C. Johnson & Son to handle the campaign for Shout soil and stain remover in Los Angeles, Miami, and San Diego. The company was also appointed to handle advertising, promotions, and public relations for Hispanocare, a new independent physicians association focused on Spanish-speaking families. Hispanocare was a joint venture between Illinois Masonic Medical Center and Mercy Hospital, both located in Chicago.

In 1989, San Jose & Associates was selected by Walgreens, a Chicago-based company, to handle its $1.5M Spanish-language advertising account. Additionally, the agency was appointed by Goya Foods, Secaucus, New Jersey, to develop new marketing programs. The agency was involved in these assignments to cater to Spanish-speaking audiences and expand market reach. In August of the same year, the company handled Spanish-language advertising for the Pan American Festival in Chicago, which celebrated the diverse Hispanic culture and music of Latin America. The festival featured various Hispanic musical acts and attracted an estimated 300,000 attendees each year.

=== 1990s ===
Viva America Radio Network, which was recently formed at that time, named San Jose & Associates as its public relations agency of record to develop promotional sales programs. Veryfine Products named San Jose & Associates as its first Hispanic agency following a competitive review.

In 1991, SJ&A was appointed as the agency of record by Ace Hardware for its first foray into Hispanic marketing. This assignment highlighted Ace Hardware's commitment to reaching Hispanic consumers as part of its broader national marketing strategy.

In 1994, San Jose & Associates was selected by Pepsi-Cola General Bottlers' Chicago Division for its $1 million-plus Hispanic regional marketing programs. This marked a shift from in-house marketing management to external agency's expertise in targeting diverse Hispanic audiences. George L. San Jose, President and Executive Creative Director of San Jose & Associates, was recognized by the Advertising Federation of Greater Miami's AdLibs. The company was acclaimed for its creative work for Anheuser-Busch. SJA was also noted for its role in integrated marketing and advertising campaigns.

In the mid-1990s, Ameritech targeted Hispanic consumers with an advertisement featuring people who used Ameritech's Caller-ID to avoid calls. The advertisement was translated from English into Spanish. The San Jose Group advised that ignoring calls is considered rude, and the company's strategy shifted to focus on portraying Caller ID as a relevant tool for greeting friends and family. Caller ID became the “smiling device,” as product users smiled when greeting callers. Sales improved five-fold.

In 1995, San Jose & Associates was selected as Hispanic agency of record for Dominick's Supermarket Chain. This included developing and executing a full spectrum market strategy for Dominick's. By 1996, Dominick's Finer Food Stores launched SJG's new advertising campaign "Un Mundo de Frescura" "World of Freshness". The campaign featured three television commercials showcasing fresh produce, dairy products, seafood, and meat, tailored to Hispanic cultural preferences. The commercials emphasized traditional Hispanic dishes and included public relations efforts highlighting recipes like chilaquiles and marinated red snapper. Weekly radio spots supported the campaign with special promotions.

In December 1995, SJ&A was selected by Motorola to launch a direct response promotional program in Mexico to address excess inventory of two-way radios. The campaign, targeted the downturn in the Mexican economy and aimed to support Motorola distributors in clearing excess inventory. The program utilized direct mail, newspaper ads, and trade publications to drive sales. Initial responses indicated significant improvements in sales, and local dealers began their own promotional efforts.

In 1996, Allstate Insurance selected San Jose & Associates as its national agency of record for its Hispanic market public relations programs. The assignment followed the formation of a new Hispanic marketing team at Allstate. By 1997, SJ&A had grown to handle $26 million in billings.

American Trans Air (ATA) selected San Jose & Associates in 1996 as its agency for targeting the Hispanic market with a television, radio and print campaign. At the time, ATA was marketing their vacation airline as a means of getting away from family and harsh winter weather. SJ&A conducted market research and found that Hispanics travel more often in the summer and with family, rather than to "get away" from them. The new campaign aimed to establish ATA as the "Official Vacation Airline" for Hispanics utilizing a series of slice-of-life scenarios featuring family-friendly vacation settings. They also sought to improve confidence in the airline by showcasing ATA's larger new aircraft. Additionally, the campaign included opening a bilingual reservations center to service to Spanish-speaking customers. Over four years, ATA increased monthly inquiry calls from Hispanic travelers from 100 to 35,000. The campaign contributed to a roughly 15% increase in overall revenues for ATA. San Jose & Associates had grown to $30 million in billings by this point.

Pleasant Company’s American Girl released Josefina Montoya, a Spanish-American Doll, in 1997 as a part of their Historic Collection. American Girl contracted SJ&A to develop a bilingual press kit and worked with ethnic media to support Josefina’s introduction to the American Girl's expansion into the Hispanic market. The event was successful; “Josefina’s Fiesta” drew a crowd of over 25,000 people to American Girl Place in downtown Chicago. The magazine highlighted the success of American Girl Place, emphasizing its unique combination of retail and museum experiences. The promoting events such as "Samantha's Ice Cream Social" in addition to other initiatives, contributed to the store's high visibility and popularity.

In 1999, QueRico.com, an Internet provider specializing in Latin American products, selected The San Jose Group (SJG), formerly San Jose & Associates (SJ&A), as its first Hispanic agency of record. The San Jose Group was tasked with launching QueRico's Latino campaign early the next year, with a focus on television advertising excluding Univision due to its policy on dot.com advertising. This marked the agency's first Internet account.

=== 2000s ===
Hanes Hosiery selected The San Jose Group as its first agency of record for the Hispanic market. The agency prepared a test campaign for Chicago and San Antonio which launched in November 2000 with an undisclosed spending. In 2002, SJG received a Silver Trumpet Award for its marketing efforts for Hanes.

The San Jose Group, serving as the agency of record for Hormel's Herdez brand, launched a pilot campaign on August 28, 2000, targeting the Hispanic market in Chicago and Houston. Later that year, The San Jose Group rolled out a national campaign for Hormel's Herdez brand to build loyalty among Mexican-American adults. The campaign was released through radio and television outlets, billboards, and P.O.P. In 2006, Hormel selected SJG to establish SPAM in the American Hispanic market. SJG created a 30-second television spot, entitled “Balloons,” that introduced a new tagline: “Imagínalo. Sabórealo.” ‘’Imagine it. Taste it.’’.

In 2001, the National Pork Board selected The San Jose Group as its agency of record for Hispanic advertising, marketing, and public relations. This marked the first time in the board's 16-year history that it developed a marketing campaign specifically targeting the Hispanic community in the U.S. The San Jose Group was chosen over agencies from New York and Los Angeles. Initial research showed that Hispanics consume pork but only in limited traditional dishes. To drive consumer demand, SJG took an educational approach to build the National Pork Board's brand. Through TV, radio, outdoor and magazine advertisements, retail sales promotions, and aggressive public relations programs, SJG helped the National Pork Board establish its presence in the Hispanic community. In 2003, SJG received an International Gold Quill Award for its work on the National Pork Board's “El Cerdo es Bueno” campaign. In 2006, SJG won a coveted EFFIE for its campaign of El Cerdo es Bueno "Pork is Good". Also in June 2001, The San Jose Group was selected by the Illinois Department of Commerce and Community Affairs, better known as The Illinois Tourism Department, to execute its most ambitious Hispanic marketing campaign.

In 2002, Cub Foods initiated a Hispanic marketing effort and appointed The San Jose Group as its first Hispanic advertising and marketing agency of record. The agency was tasked with developing campaigns focused on Hispanic consumers, with initial efforts concentrated in Chicago and Denver. The Dial Corporation selected The San Jose Group as its Hispanic marketing and advertising agency of record, marking the first time Dial directly targeted the Hispanic market. SJG's assignment included Dial's bar soaps, body washes, and liquid soaps, in addition to Dial's line of Purex liquid, powder, and tablet laundry detergents.

The San Jose Group was appointed by Hormel Foods to manage Hispanic marketing efforts for all its products, expanding its existing relationship beyond the Herdez brand. The company had previously worked on Hispanic marketing campaigns for Hormel's Herdez brand, including products like Bufalo hot sauces, Herdez salsas, and Dona Maria Mole; Hormel's total advertising expenditure was over $45 million in 2003.

In 2004, Exelon appointed The San Jose Group as its Hispanic agency of record also serving ComEd and PECO energy delivery companies.

In 2006, Hormel Foods Corp. announced plans to expand its Spanish-language advertising campaign nationwide, initially launched in California. The campaign featured notable television commercials like “El Comelón,” which showcased a child sneakily eating Hormel's Cold Cuts at a family gathering. The expansion included TV, radio, billboard, and print ads.

American Family Insurance selected The San Jose Group for multicultural advertising in 2006. SJG created a 30-second television spot called "Batazo" or "Hit", based on global truths, which made it culturally relevant for Hispanics, African American and general market audiences. The commercial focused on family, and SJG supported the ad with an integrated marketing communications program which included TV, radio, print, direct mail, and collateral material and a Spanish speaking reservation center to manage inbound calls. The campaign increased brand consideration by 22% in the first 6 months. Later, with the help of SJG, American Family Insurance, launched its first music-licensing advertising campaign targeted at the Hispanic market. They created an advertisement aimed at 18 to 34 year-olds which featured Grammy Award Winner Calle 13's remix of the song "No Hay Nadie Como Tú." The San Jose Group also developed new multicultural and general market concepts for American Family Insurance as part of their American Dreams “Driveway Dreamer” and Unique Families campaigns. The "Three Kids" television spots, aimed at Hispanic, African American and the general market, depicted a mother's busy life and the various needs of families.

In 2007, Hy Cite Corporation, with The San Jose Group as its Hispanic agency of record, launched its first Spanish-language television campaign for the Royal Prestige cookware line. The campaign, included 30 and 60-second TV and Radio commercials targeting Hispanic women heads of household aged 18 to 49, and Latino men who influence home purchase decisions. The campaign's debut ad was titled "Transitions." SJG also started a Spanish-language advertising campaign for ComEd's compact fluorescent light bulbs, serving as their Hispanic advertising agency of record. The campaign aired from October to December 2007 in Chicago and Rockford and featured a humorous 30-second spot focusing on a hairdresser discussing the benefits of the CFL bulbs. The campaign aimed to leverage humor to effectively communicate energy conservation benefits to Latino audiences.

In 2007, the Illinois Office of Tourism (IOT) expanded The San Jose Group role as their new multicultural advertising and public relations agency. SJG used traditional media, such as TV, radio, and print, to target Multicultural Midwest publics. As online activity increased, SJG began to focus IOT's campaign online, creating an interactive, Spanish-language website in 2008. Hispanic Chicago celebrities, including Tsi-Tsi-Ki Félix of Telemundo and Ozzie Guillen endorsed state attractions, and the site focused on family-friendly “staycation” travel ideas. IOT's website increased average page views, average length of visit, and repeat visitors following the website development and public relations campaign.

=== 2010s ===
In January 2010, San Jose Public Relations (SJPR) was selected to represent Gift of Hope, an organization focused on coordinating organ and tissue donations in Illinois and the Northwest Indiana region. The campaign, part of a broader public relations strategy, aimed to address misconceptions about the need for organ donations and to increase awareness within the Hispanic community. SJPR's work included media relations, grassroots outreach, and community relations. This initiative followed a previous project where SJPR successfully raised awareness for the Gift of Hope, contributing to significant improvements in the visibility and understanding of organ donation among Hispanic audiences.

Around 2010, the Chicago White Sox appointed The San Jose Group as their Hispanic marketing agency to manage the team's PR, online marketing, creative, and advertising campaigns. The San Jose Group was again tapped by The Chicago White Sox and in May of that same year introduced a new slogan, "Disfruta Nuestro Ritmo" "Enjoy Our Pace". The new campaign included online, print, radio, and television advertisements in English and Spanish. The campaign also promoted designated games with Hispanic community themes, including "Noche del Trabajador" "Hispanic Business Night" and Latino College Night.

The San Jose Network (SJN) and Transworld Advertising Agency Network (TAAN) established a global alliance to pool their resources and expertise in early 2010. This partnership, formalized in Mexico, combined the strengths of SJN's focus on multicultural markets in the U.S. and Latin America with TAAN's global network of independent agencies. The combined presence of the alliance is in over 65 countries, encompassing 69 agencies and generating $1.1 billion in combined global billings.

In 2012, ECHO Incorporated selected The San Jose Network Ltd. for the development of its ECHO, Shindaiwa and Bear Cat brands Latin America. This marked the first time a Global branding and positioning strategy had been adopted for each of the ECHO brands. SJN provided direction and structure for a centralized communication Global approach featuring all digital and promotional assets.

To increase organ donation awareness and boost donor registrations for the Illinois Organ & Tissue Donor Registry, SJ Public Relations (SJPR) and Gift of Hope Organ & Tissue Network launched a campaign, featuring Alex Rodriguez and honoring Francisco 'Paco' Rodriguez, which included a float at the 2012 Rose Parade and a press conference in Chicago. The initiative resulted in over 156 media placements and added 2,021 new organ donors, earning SJPR a Silver Trumpet in the Special Events category.

During the 2013 holiday season, The San Jose Network (SJN) developed and launched a television campaign for Bulova Watches that ran simultaneously in every Latin American country. This campaign marked the first time that Bulova broadcast a Spanish-language television commercial across the entire region, reflecting SJN's role as Bulova's Latin American Agency of Record.

In 2014, The San Jose Network (SJN) and the Trans-Canada Advertising Agency Network (T-CAAN) announced a strategic alliance aimed at enhancing their collective expertise and market reach across the Americas. This partnership united T-CAAN, the largest independent agency network in Canada, and SJN, a major player in multicultural marketing in the U.S. and Latin America, creating a network of 44 agencies across more than 20 countries with combined global billings exceeding $950 million.

On April 16, 2014, Tribeca Flashpoint Media Arts Academy selected The San Jose Group (SJG) as its agency of record. SJG was tasked with planning and executing a media campaign for the greater Chicagoland area.

In 2015, Carl Buddig & Company selected The San Jose Group as its multicultural agency of record. The agency was tasked with launching Buddig's first Hispanic-targeted marketing campaign, which included digital, out-of-home, social media, and TV and radio advertisements. A notable aspect of the campaign was the "Buddig Taste Challenge," which involved Latina food bloggers competing to enhance Buddig's deli meats with Latin flavors.

=== Notable Marketing Communications Campaigns ===
In 2000, Hormel selected The San Jose Group to target Hispanic markets for its Herdez brand. The partnership expanded in 2003 to include all Hormel products, leading to a national campaign that built brand loyalty among Mexican-American adults through diverse media channels. SJG also created a bilingual TV spot in 2006 to introduce Hormel's SPAM to the Hispanic market.

In 2001, the National Pork Board partnered with The San Jose Group. While pork was liked by consumers, health-related misconceptions among Hispanics inhibited their pork consumption. SJG created an advertising and PR campaign to promote and educate Hispanic consumers about pork's health benefits. The campaign resulted in a 75 percent increase in pork purchase among Hispanics, 31 million gross impressions, and the equivalent of $1.7 million in media value. In 2006, SJG won a coveted EFFIE for its campaign of El Cerdo es Bueno "Pork is Good".

In 2006, American Family Insurance selected The San Jose Group for multicultural advertising and launched a campaign focused on family, which increased brand consideration by 22% within six months. SJG also developed a music-licensing advertisement aimed at 18 to 34 year-olds in the Hispanic market and launched the Total Market “American Dream Campaign".

The group also notably worked with Gift of Hope's various organ donation campaigns through 2010s and won multiple awards including one for breaking a Guinness World Record for most organ and tissue registration in one day.

In 2013, Bulova Watches contracted The San Jose Network to launch its first Spanish and Portuguese-language television campaign across Latin America. In 2014, SJN rolled out Bulova's most aggressive campaign by leveraging its status as the official timekeeper of English premier league Manchester United with FIFA’s World Cup taking place throughout Brazil.

In 2019, Magnum Insurance enlisted The San Jose Group (SJG) to reverse its declining market share. SJG crafted a bilingual consumer-centric communication strategy and helped navigate the internal and external digital transformation of systems across operations, database management, and marketing technology, including automation and custom software development.

Other notable marketing campaigns clients include Abbott, Exelon, Sara Lee Corporation and Sears Roebuck & Co.

== Awards ==
=== Advertising Creativity ===
- Award of Excellence in The Communicator Awards competition for its radio campaign for Herdez, a division of Hormel Foods, 2001.
- Award of Excellence in The Communicator Awards competition for its radio campaign for National Pork Board, 2003.
- Communicator Award (print media competition) for SJG's print advertising for ATA Airlines, 2003.
- Bronze Effie Award in the Hispanic category for the "El Cerdo es Bueno" ("Pork is Good") campaign, 2006.
- Hermes Awards for SPAM’s “Balloons”, 2007.
- Hermes Awards for HERDEZ “Desde Arriba”, 2007.
- Hermes Awards for Hy Cite’s Royal Prestige’s “Transitions”, 2007.
- Aurora Gold Award, American Family Insurance, "Three Kids," 2011.
- Aurora Gold Award, American Family Insurance, "Nadie Como Tu," 2011.
- Merit Award, American Family Insurance, 2011.

=== Public Relations ===
- Edwin J. Shaugnessy Quality of Life Award for excellence in planning, creativity, and execution for the American Cancer Society's "Tómese el Tiempo" campaign, 1992.
- "Golden Trumpet" awards by the Publicity Club of Chicago (PCC) for its campaign supporting the American Cancer Society's (ACS) "Tómese el Tiempo" campaign - 1992.
- Edwin J. Shaghnessy Quality of Life Award for American Cancer Society's "Saving Lives Through Awareness" campaign, 1993.
- PCC Silver Trumpet for American Cancer Society's "¡No Fumes! (Don't Smoke) Don't Blow It!" campaign, 1994.
- Silver Trumpet for SJG's national Hispanic marketing work for Hanes Hosiery, 2002.
- Silver Trumpet for SJG's Hispanic Christian Churches Association Public Service Announcement program, 2002.
- International Gold Quill Award for SJG's "El Cerdo es Bueno" campaign for the National Pork Board, 2003.
- Platinum PR Award (Honorable Mention) "Multicultural National Pork Board Campaign (El Cerdo es Bueno.)" 2005.
- Two Golden Trumpet Awards from Publicity Club of Chicago for its Hispanic public relations work for US Cellular and Illinois Bureau of Tourism, 2009.
- Golden Trumpet for Gift of Hope's National Donate Life Month, 2011.
- Silver Trumpet for Gift of Hope's National Donor Sabbath, 2011.
- Silver Trumpet to SJPR for its media relations campaign supporting the Gift of Hope Organ & Tissue Network, 2012.
- Golden Trumpet & Silver Trumpet to SJPR for its work in the National Minority Donor Awareness Day campaign, 2012.
- Golden Trumpet Award / Community relations for Gift of Hope, 2013.
- Golden Trumpet Award / Special Events & Observances for Gift of Hope, 2013.
- Silver Trumpet Award / Community Relations for Gift of Hope, 2013.
- Silver Trumpet Award / Special Events & Observances for Gift of Hope, 2013.
- Silver Telly Award for Gift of Hope's “At the Opera” PSA, 2014.
