= São José do Brejo do Cruz =

Coordinates: 6.21278°S 37.3519°W

- Municipality
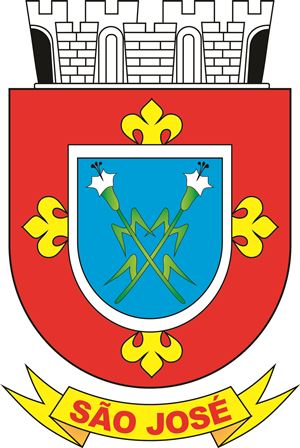
- Flag Coat of arms
- Interactive map of São José do Brejo do Cruz
- Country: Brazil
- Region: Northeast
- State: Paraíba
- Mesoregion: Sertao Paraibana

Population (2020)
  - Total: 1,811
- Time zone: UTC−3 (BRT)

São José do Brejo do Cruz is a municipality in the state of Paraíba in the Northeast Region of Brazil.

== See also ==
- List of municipalities in Paraíba
