= São José dos Cordeiros =

Coordinates: 7°23′S 36°48′W

- Municipality
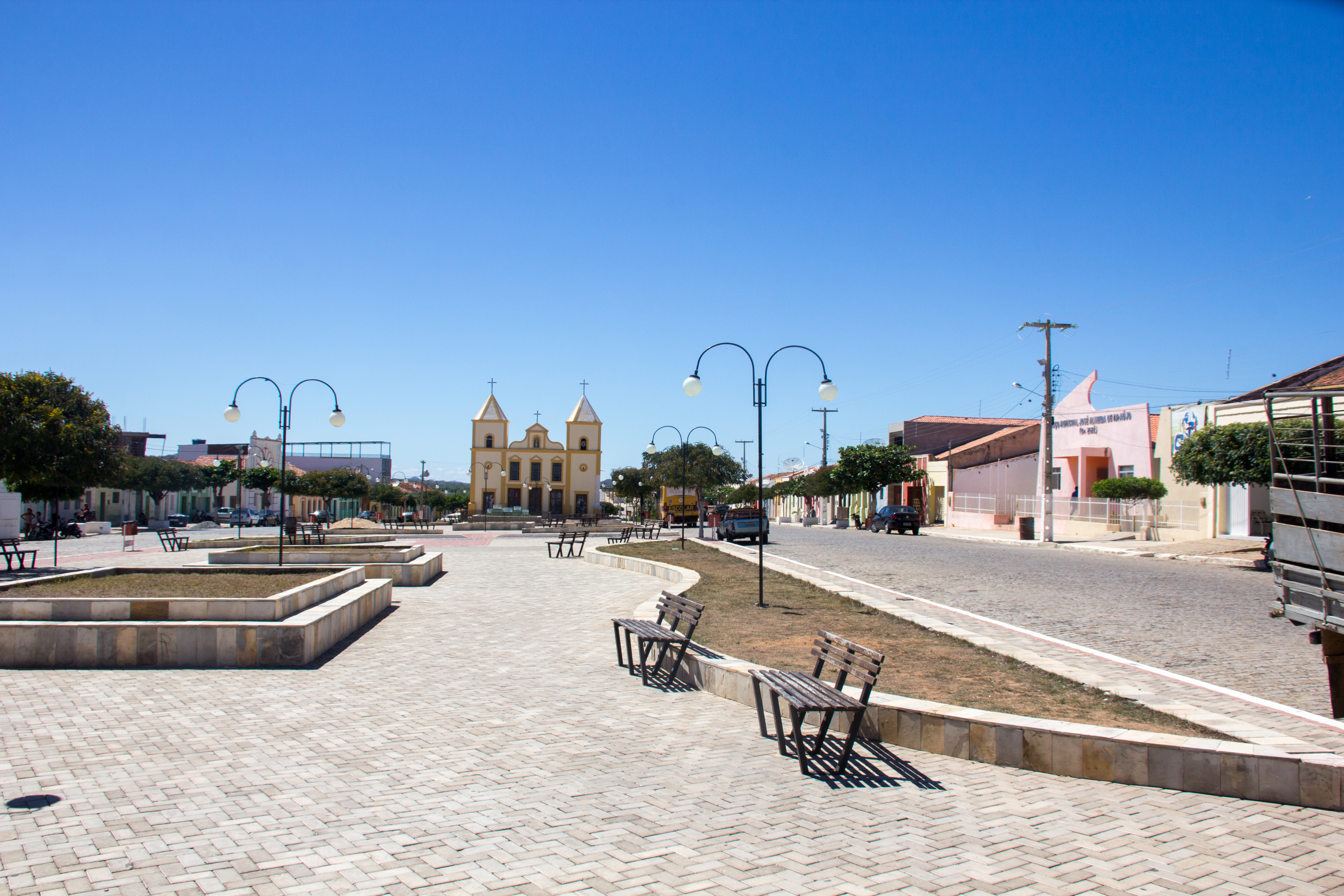

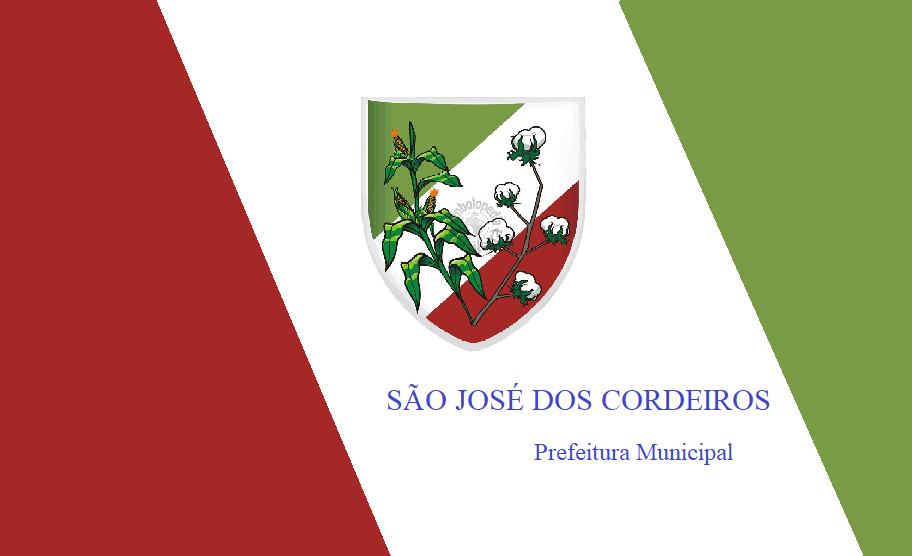
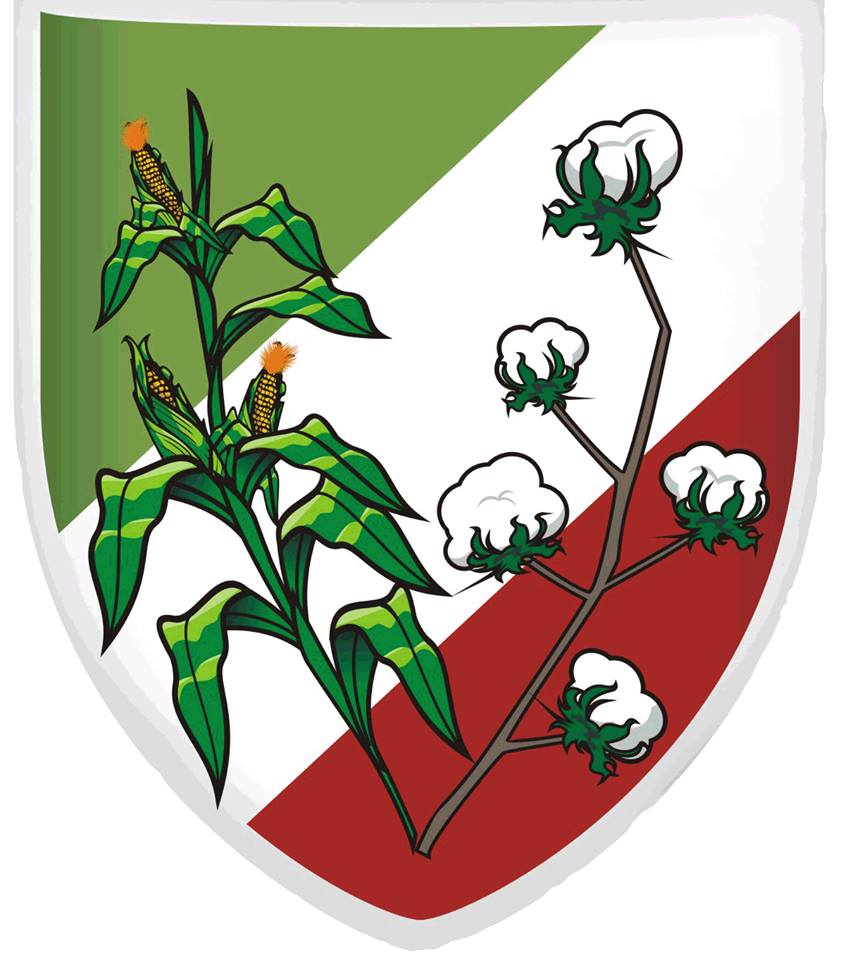
- Flag Coat of arms
- Interactive map of São José dos Cordeiros
- Country: Brazil
- Region: South
- State: Paraíba
- Mesoregion: Boborema

Population (2020)
  - Total: 3,618
- Time zone: UTC−3 (BRT)

São José dos Cordeiros (Central northeastern portuguese pronunciation: [ˈsɐ̃w ʒuˈzɛ duɦ koɦˈdeɾŭ]) is a municipality in the state of Paraíba in the Northeast Region of Brazil.

== See also ==
- List of municipalities in Paraíba
