= Colonia Barón =

Coordinates: 36°09′S 63°50′W

- Town
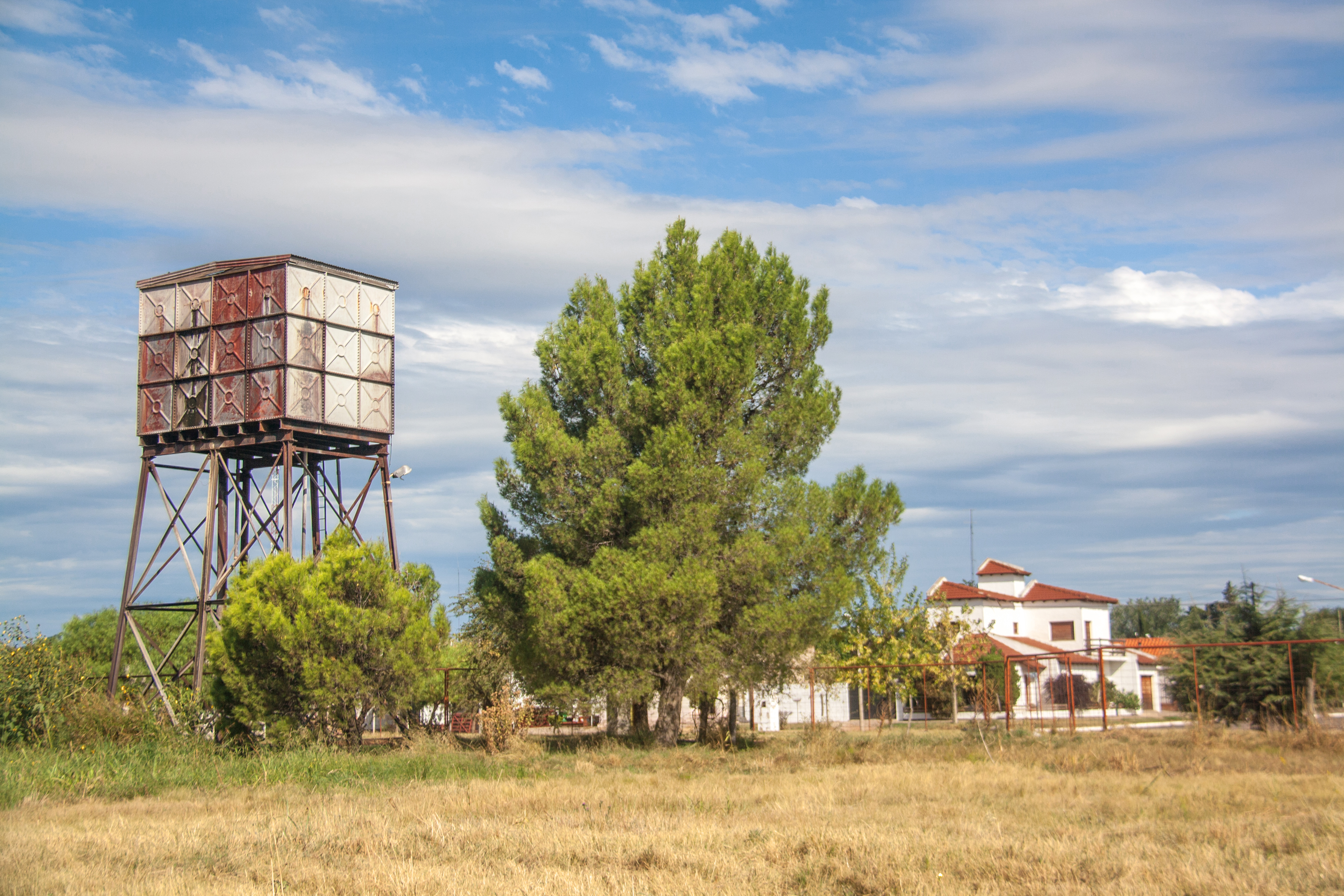
- Interactive map of Colonia Barón
- Country: Argentina
- Province: La Pampa
- Department: Quemú Quemú
- Time zone: UTC−3 (ART)

Colonia Barón is a town in the Quemú Quemú Department of La Pampa Province in Argentina.

== People ==
The speedway rider Coty Garcia is from the town.
