= Paco San José =

Spanish folk musician and music educator

Background information
- Born: Francisco San José Mediavilla; 18 May 1958 (age 68); Santander, Cantabria, Spain
- Genres: Cantabrian folk, Andean music, New-age
- Occupations: Musician, composer, writer, music educator
- Instruments: Pitu montañés (E-flat clarinet), B-flat clarinet, bagpipes, dulzaina, three-hole pipe, transverse flute, quena, guitar, accordion
- Years active: 1976–present
- Award: Premio Proa (2022)

Francisco San José Mediavilla, known professionally as Paco San José, is a Spanish musician and folklorist born on 18 May 1958 in Santander, Cantabria. He performs traditional Cantabrian instruments, chiefly the pitu montañés, and has released recordings since 1989. He founded the Banda de Piteros de Santander in 2005 and has written two books on Cantabrian folk culture.

== Early life and education ==
San José was born on 18 May 1958 in Santander. He graduated from the Jesús de Monasterio Conservatory as a music teacher, with a specialization in flute, and completed a course in choral conducting. He studied flute between the ages of 22 and 32. On the clarinete requinto, known in Cantabria as the pitu montañés, he is self-taught. He has mentioned Tomás Castillo, known as "Tomasón" de Anievas, and Bernardino Blanco as his main stylistic references.

== Career ==
San José has worked as a professional pitero since 1980. In 1976, performing with the group Colibrí, he won first prize in the musical-groups category at the Festival del Auditórium in Santander. The same year, Colibrí also won the festival's overall final. In 1979, again with Colibrí, he reached the final of the Spanish television talent contest Gente Joven.

In 1985, performing with the folk dance group of the Asociación de Sordos de Santander, he won first prize in the group category and second prize in the pairs category at a national contest in Zaragoza. At the pitero pairs contest held during the Día de Campoo, he won two first prizes and one second prize alongside drummer José Antonio Urcelay, known as "el Cachas".

In 1989, together with Manuel Luna and his cuadrilla, he represented Spain at the European Broadcasting Union festival in Fagernes, Norway. Between 1990 and 2010 he took part in folk-music showcases in France. In 1995 he performed at the Festival de la Clarinette in Le Lamentin, Martinique.

From 1995 to 1999 he taught at the Escuela de Música Tradicional de Santander, a school he had helped found. In 1990 he was elected founding president of the Asociación Cultural Promúsica de Santander and organized its first chamber-music competition.

He organized and directed the Festival Internacional de Piteros in Cantabria from 2002 to 2010. Since 2002, the related Encuentro Internacional de Piteros has been organized by the associations ADIC and Musifolk together with San José, according to a 2009 study by ethnomusicologist Susana Moreno Fernández. He founded the Colectivo de Piteros in 2000 and led further training courses for professional piteros in 2006, 2010, and 2019. He founded the Banda de Piteros de Santander in 2005.

Over his career he has played with groups including Coros y Danzas de Santander, the Cuadrilla de Manuel Luna, Llendemozó, Luétiga, La Pasma, Landeral, the Banda de Piteros de Santander, Colibrí, Malembe, Nueva Alquimia, and Jisquío.

San José is the author of two books. La vida secreta de los piteros: 30 años de anécdotas y vivencias (2010) collects three decades of anecdotes from his career and Cuentos y leyendas de los Picos de Europa (2016) is a collection of legends from the Picos de Europa mountain range.

In January 2006 he published the article "Los piteros" in response to a text by Bernardino Blanco Ruiz that had appeared in the Revista Altamira of the Centro de Estudios Montañeses. He is also the author of "El pitu montañés", an article on the traditional Cantabrian clarinet published in issue 41 of the magazine Interfolk in June 2009. His 2006 reply to Blanco Ruiz is cited as a primary source in a 2025 article on the requinto clarinet by Francisco José Gil Ortiz, published in Consonancias, the journal of the Conservatorio Superior de Música de Castilla–La Mancha. His book La vida secreta de los piteros is cited in a 2013 article on rabel players in Cantabria, published in Cuadernos de Música Iberoamericana.

He wrote the lyrics and music for "Conversaciones con Carmen", a piece about a sailor recalling the Bay of Santander. It was first performed on 28 June 2022 at the Gala del Folclore Cántabro by the Coro Ronda Altamira, conducted by José Ramón Ibáñez. He also composed "Liébana Peregrina", a choral piece with lyrics by Matilde Camus and choral arrangement by José Manuel Fernández, planned for a premiere during the 2023 Holy Year of Liébana.

== Awards and recognition ==
In 2007, the Parliament of Cantabria recognized San José for the 25th anniversary of the region's autonomy. In 2014 he received the II Galardón Isla de Mouro from the Escuela de Música Tradicional Cántabra de Santander. In June 2022 he received the Premio Proa, a lifetime-achievement award, at the Gala del Folclore Cántabro.

== Selected discography ==
- Pito y Tambor (1989)
- Llanura Nazca (1996)
- El Templo del Sol (2001)
- A lo vivu (2001)
- La Lluvia del Arcoíris (2004)
- En Directo (2007)
- Pito y Tambor tradicional (2008)
- Pólvora Fina (2010)
- La Música de las Danzas de Cantabria (2011)
- Iquique (2015)
- Piteros y Rabeles (2018)
- En Directo (2019)
- Valvanuz (2024)
- Cantabria América (2025)

According to Folk Cantabria, he has made fourteen recordings under his own name and contributed to twenty-nine more, for a total of forty-two albums, thirty-two of them dedicated to Cantabrian music. The Biblioteca Nacional de España catalogs two 1989 sound recordings: A lo bajo y a lo alto; A lo pesao y a lo ligero, and Tambor, pitos y estribillos.

== Publications ==
- San José Mediavilla, Francisco (2010). La vida secreta de los piteros: 30 años de anécdotas y vivencias (in Spanish). Cantabria Tradicional. ISBN 978-84-15112-00-6.
- San José Mediavilla, Francisco (2016). Cuentos y leyendas de los Picos de Europa (in Spanish). UNO Editorial. ISBN 978-84-16607-78-5.

== Personal life ==
San José practices mountaineering in his free time. On 6 June 2016, after a thirteen-year relationship, he married María Gómez Ganzo at the summit of the Naranjo de Bulnes (Picu Urriellu) in the Picos de Europa. He has two daughters from a previous marriage and two grandchildren. He worked as an administrative clerk for most of his career and has since retired from that profession.
