= Colonia San José, La Pampa =

Colonia San José
- Rural locality and village
- Location within Argentina
- Coordinates: 36°6′S 63°54′W
- Country: Argentina
- Province: La Pampa Province
- Department: Quemú Quemú
- Time zone: UTC−3 (ART)

Colonia San José is a village and rural locality (municipality) in La Pampa Province in Argentina.
