= São José do Sabugi =

- Municipality
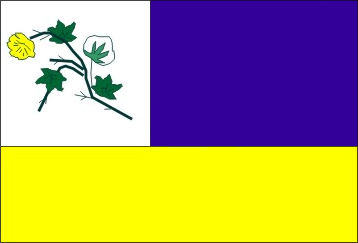
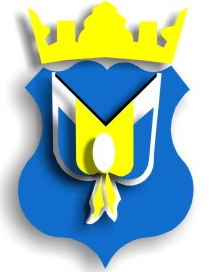
- Flag Coat of arms

- Location in Brazil
- Coordinates: 6°46′33″S 36°47′56″W
- Country: Brazil
- Region: Northeast
- State: Paraíba
- Mesoregion: Boborema

Population (2020)
  - Total: 4,147
- Time zone: UTC−3 (BRT)

São José do Sabugi (Central northeastern portuguese pronunciation: [ˈsɐ̃w ʒuˈzɛ du sɐbuˈʒi]) is a municipality in the state of Paraíba in the Northeast Region of Brazil.

== See also ==
- List of municipalities in Paraíba
