= Colegio San José =

Colegio San José may refer to:

- Colegio San José, Arequipa, a Jesuit boys' school in Peru
- Colegio San José (San Juan), a boys college preparatory school
- Colegio San José (San Germán), a co-educational college preparatory school
