= Hammamet =

Hammamet may refer to:

- Hammamet, Algiers, a town and commune in Algiers Province, Algeria
- Hammamet, Tébessa, a town and commune in Tébessa Province, Algeria
- Hammamet, Tunisia, a coastal city on the northern edge of the Gulf of Hammamet
- Gulf of Hammamet, a large gulf in northeastern Tunisia
- Hammamet (film), a 2020 Italian biographical drama film
