= Teo San José =

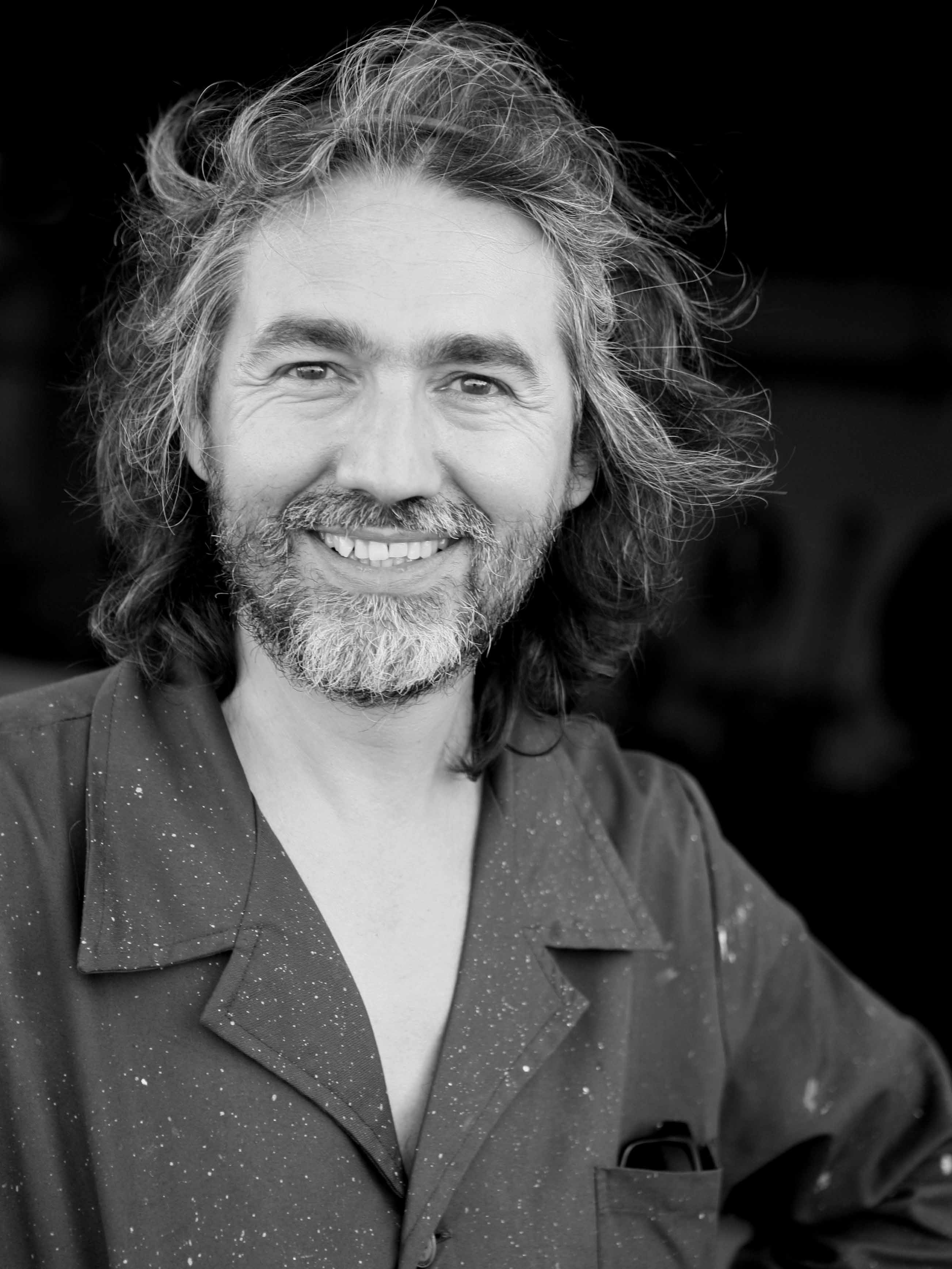
- Teo San José 2009 por Jose María Hortelano.
- Born: Teodoro San José Aguilar; Valladolid (Spain)
- Known for: Sculpture, art therapy, writer
- Movement: Modern art
- Awards: V National Design Award Industry and Commerce Ministry of Spain, Sculpture Forecourt RBS, Honorable Award ARTOTEQUE., International Symposium of Sculpture of Cyrus y RBS Member (Royal British Society of Sculptors)

Teodoro San José Aguilar is a sculptor, painter, art therapist and writer. He created the Seeds for Peace to the World Foundation. He has also created the concept of Urban Plastic-Aesthetic Interventions applied to monumental public sculptures.

== Artistic biography ==
=== Beginnings ===
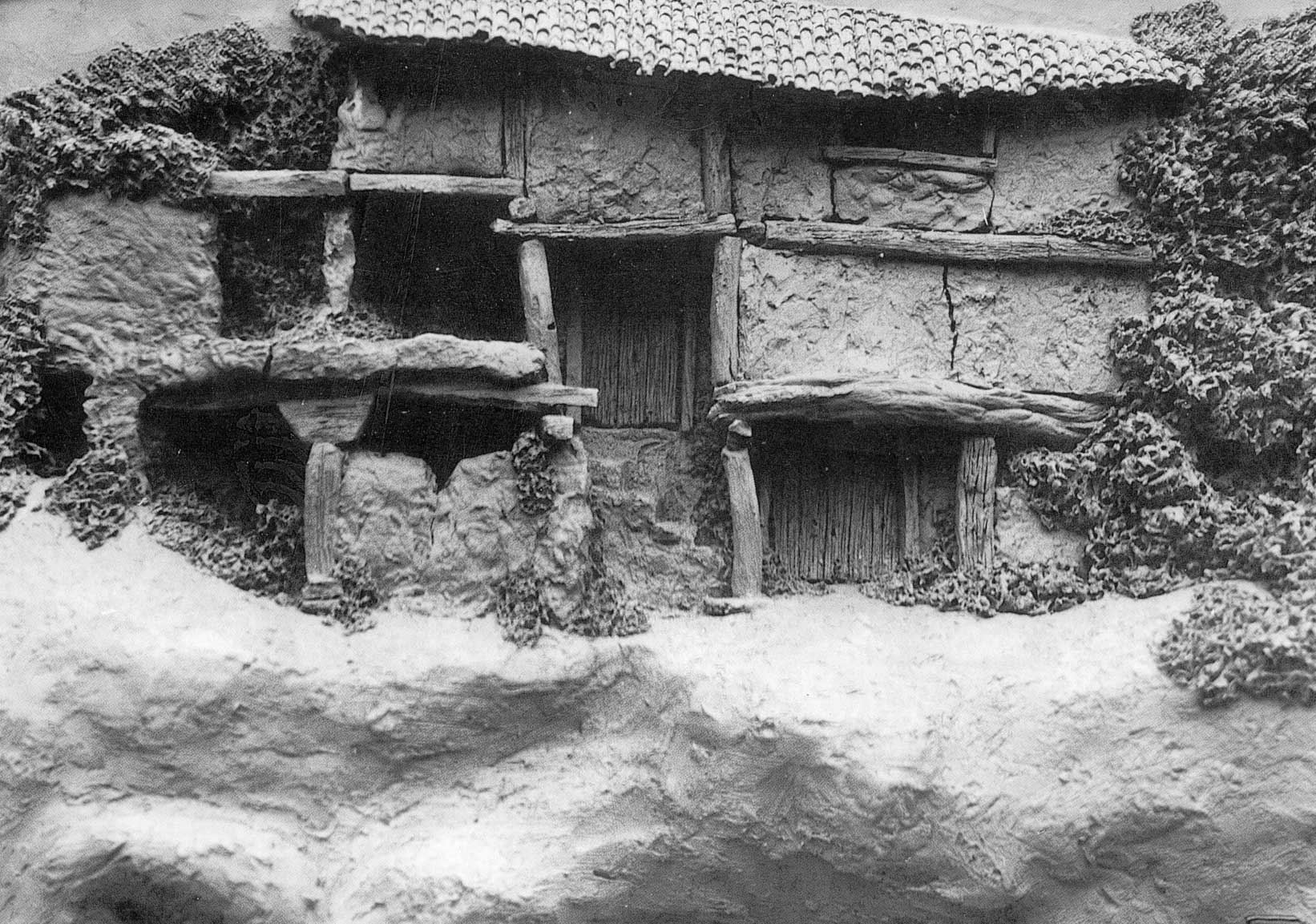
high relief murals clay baked at 1,832 °F (1,000 °C) in a gas. Popular arquitecture texture nº28

From his very beginning (1987–1990) San José set off with the sole idea of working with light and shadows and also with textures. This idea lead him work exclusively with the yellowish clay of Castilla (center Spain) for years and to undertake high relief murals following a hyperrealist technique of great impact. The clay is baked at 1,832 °F (1,000 °C) in a gas oven with the carbonation technique.

The imprint of this earth can be noticed with all its characteristics in the work named Textures, based on popular architectural elements, a subject that, being the foundation of his work. He becomes an expert in this field and that allows him to give lectures on the subject and to write a book commissioned by the Popular University of San Sebastian de los Reyes, Madrid, titled: Strolling through The Community of Madrid. Popular Architecture.

This book was unique in this field of literature because it drew attention to what elements, aesthetically speaking, were noteworthy for each type of place. The book gave some routes that allow the reader to explore and recognize these important samples of a village or region´s specific traditional culture, those aspects that for centuries have defined its peculiar urban appearance. This book sold out years ago.

=== Evolution ===
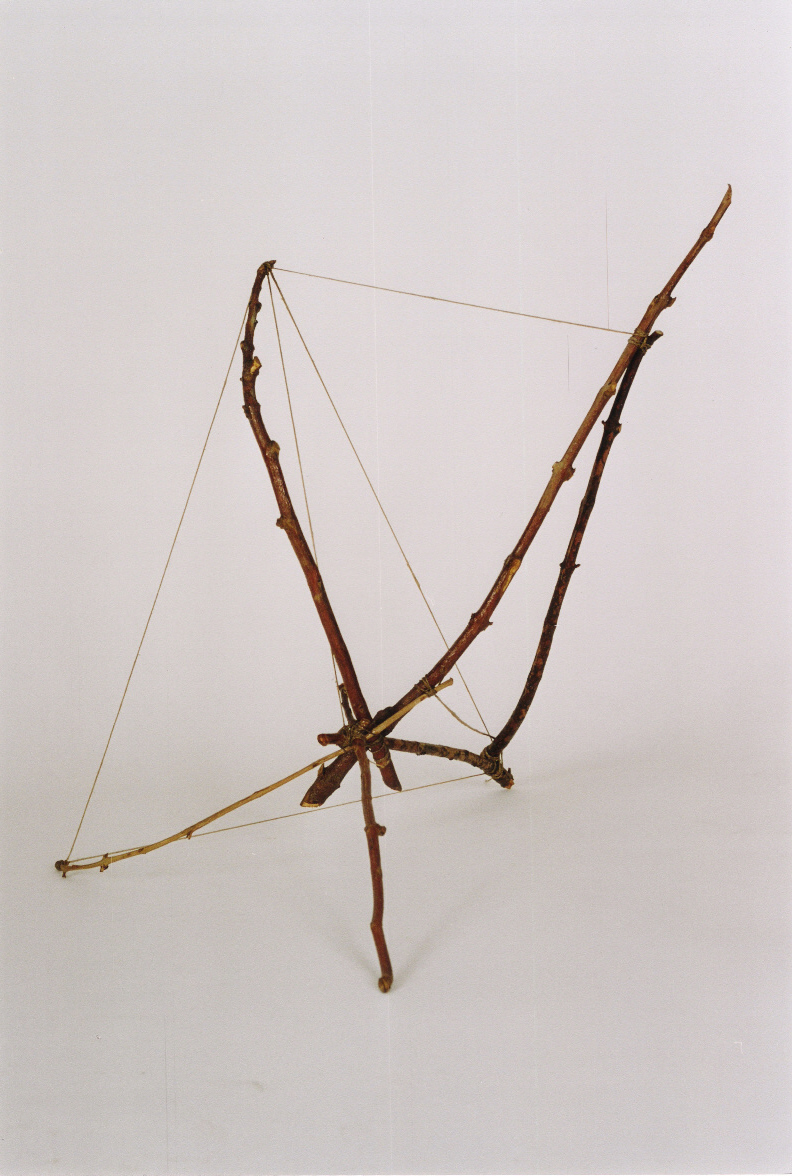
Tree branches and strings sculpture

A trip to Hamburg and Berlin in the beginning of the 90s marked a definite change in his work as he had the chance of meeting directly with works by Jean Arp, Henry Moore and Calder which together with the impact of Kandinsky watercolors, transformed in a drastic way his sculptures. He abandoned hyperrealism which was a characteristic of his work, to move to total abstraction. However, he kept his personal use of very elementary elements such as tree branches that have been pruned or very simple strings made of natural materials. This series was called the Tensions. This took a decade to complete but surprisingly it was never exhibited to the public as most of the pieces were burnt in an unfortunate accident.

=== Internacionalization ===
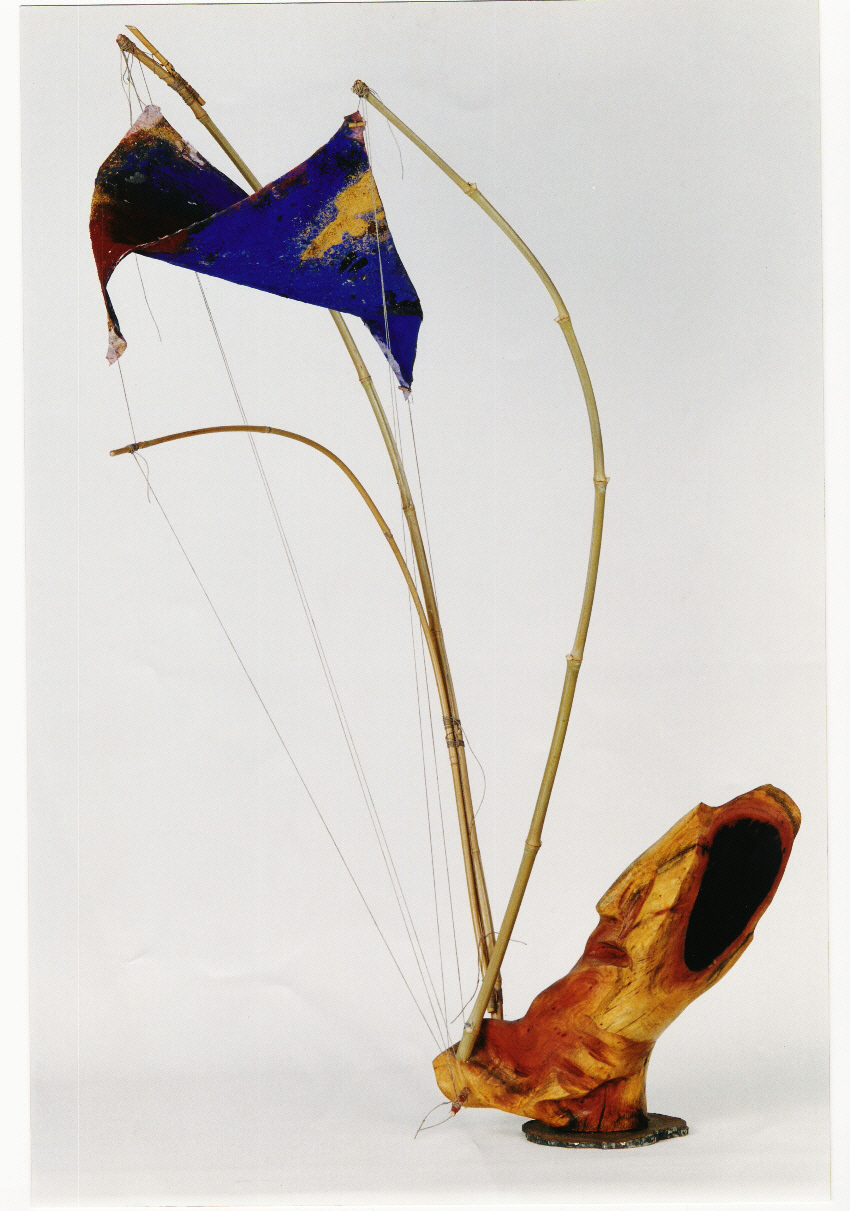
Carved wood, bamboo and raw pigments fabric sculpture.

Two major events in the artist's life took place in the year 2000. An exhibition in Denia, Alicante (Spain) of work done there, where he has been living for the last ten years. In this exhibition the M.Y.S. series, Movement and Solidity, made completely in steel where color appears for the first time, together with the series Woman and Tensions made in carved wood and bronze or with tree branches and natural strings.

Also in this exhibition in an exclusive way, he showed the Picto series which are volumes, paintings made with a technique based on using colors as a solid material like pigments or other pastes. This creates micro-volumes where the pigment or color can appear to come from inside the picture, in its middle coats or at the surface generating millions of textures and volumes. In the same year he was selected to take part in the International Biennial Exhibition of Contemporary Art in Florence where he showed his most avant-garde work.

The international reviews specialized in art was highly impress by his sculptures The Cloth Sailing Ships and reviews are written about his work in international art press, together with an invitation to represent Spain at the Triennial Exhibition of Contemporary Art in Paris. He is the sole Spanish artist to take part in it. His sculptures are shown at the Great Arch of the Defense in Paris, (France).

=== Recognition ===
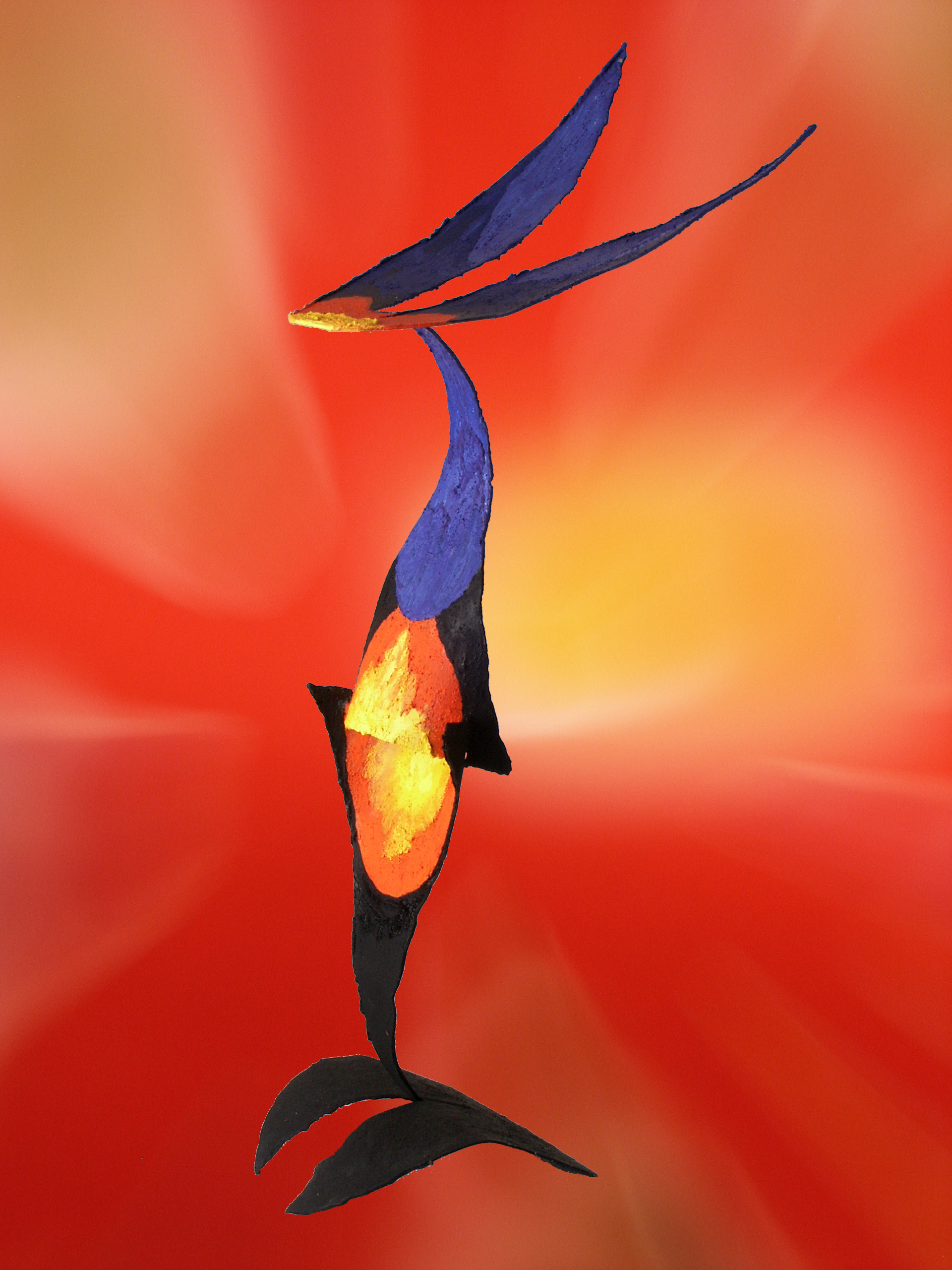
Steel color sculpture. 6.5 × 3 x 2 foot

Our artist's life went through a change in the year 2006 when he was selected to take part in the Summer Exhibition of the Royal Academy in London where his works were shown side by side to Antoni Tàpies. His sculpture Fire Bird had such an effect that the exhibition jury chose it as one of the event's most significant pieces and a special documentary was made of this exhibit by BBC London.

From then on his work has been recognized in the United Kingdom. First he was chosen as a member of the Royal British Society of Sculptors in London and later, this prestigious institution, awarded him with the prize Sculpture Forecour, he is the first Spaniard to receive it. From then on his works was exhibited all through United Kingdom In the year 2009 he was selected by the Spanish Embassy in London to represent Spain at the International Biennial of Architecture of London

At present he combines his production of big size sculptures with his activities in the Seeds for Peace to the World Foundation. One of his last works is the 40-foot-tall high sculpture Serenity Portal made in steel and placed in the city of Querétaro in Mexico.

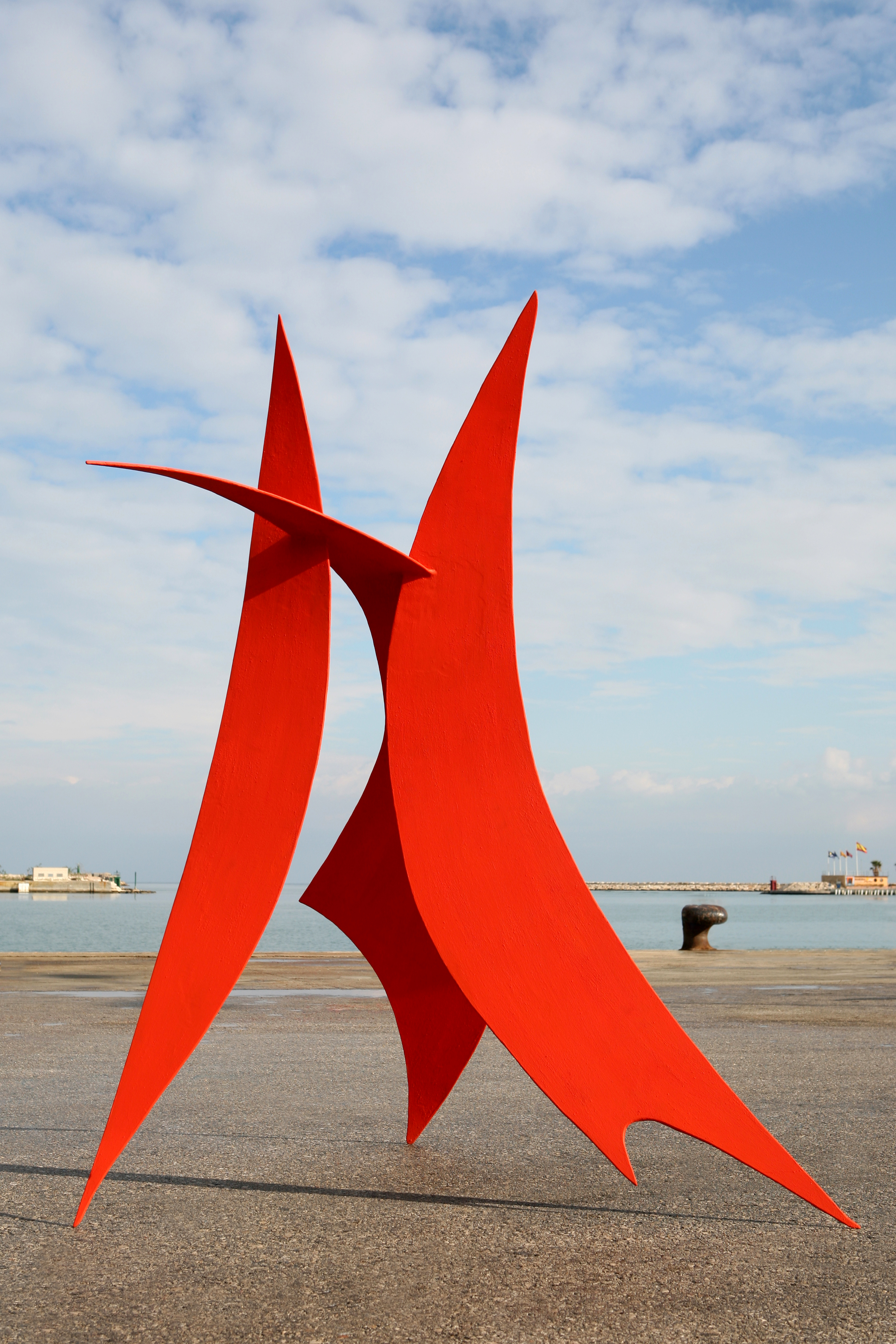
Colored Steel Sculpture de 6.5 x 6.5 x 5.25 foot

== International events ==
- UBE Biennial of Contemporary Sculpture, Ube. (Japan).
- Biennial Exhibition of Contemporary Art in Florence. (Italy).
- Triennial Exhibition of Contemporary Art in Paris. (France).
- European Show of Contemporary Art Chouzy-sur-Cisse. (France).
- Printemps Romarantin Show. (France)
- Summer Exhinbition. Royal Academy of Art London. United Kingdom.
- Royal British Society of Sculptors. London. United Kingdom.
- Spanish Representation at the International Biennial of Architecture. London. United Kingdom.
- Sculpture in "Paradise" Chichester. United Kingdom.
- Art Contact Cambridge. United Kingdom.
- Sculpture Park. North Yorkshire. United Kingdom.
- Grove Exhibition. London. United Kingdom.
- Exhibition Manuel Chacón Gallery. Mexico
- Paralax Exhibition. New York US

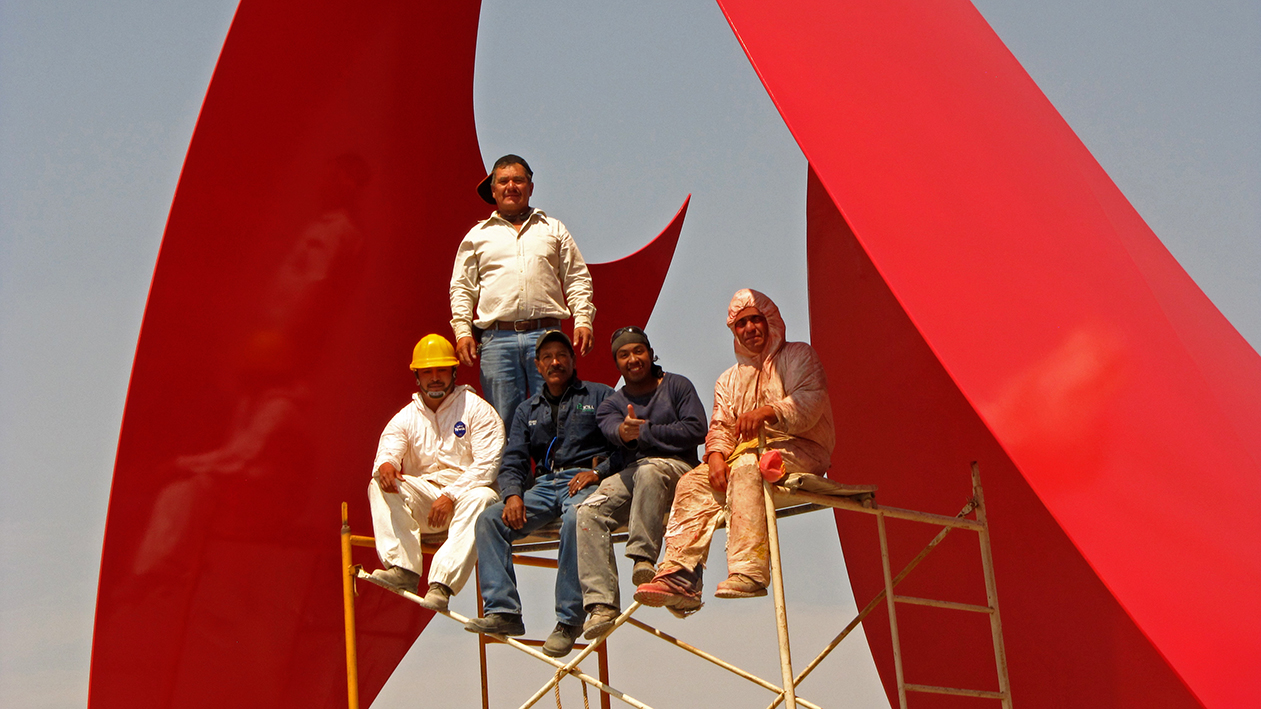
40-foot-tall high sculpture Serenity Portal

== Awards and recognition ==
- V National Design Award Industry and Commerce Ministry of Spain.
- Sculpture Forecourt RBS, London (United Kingdom).
- Honorable Award ARTOTEQUE, London. United Kingdom..
- International Symposium of Sculpture of Cyrus.
- RBS Member (Royal British Society of Sculptors), London. United Kingdom..

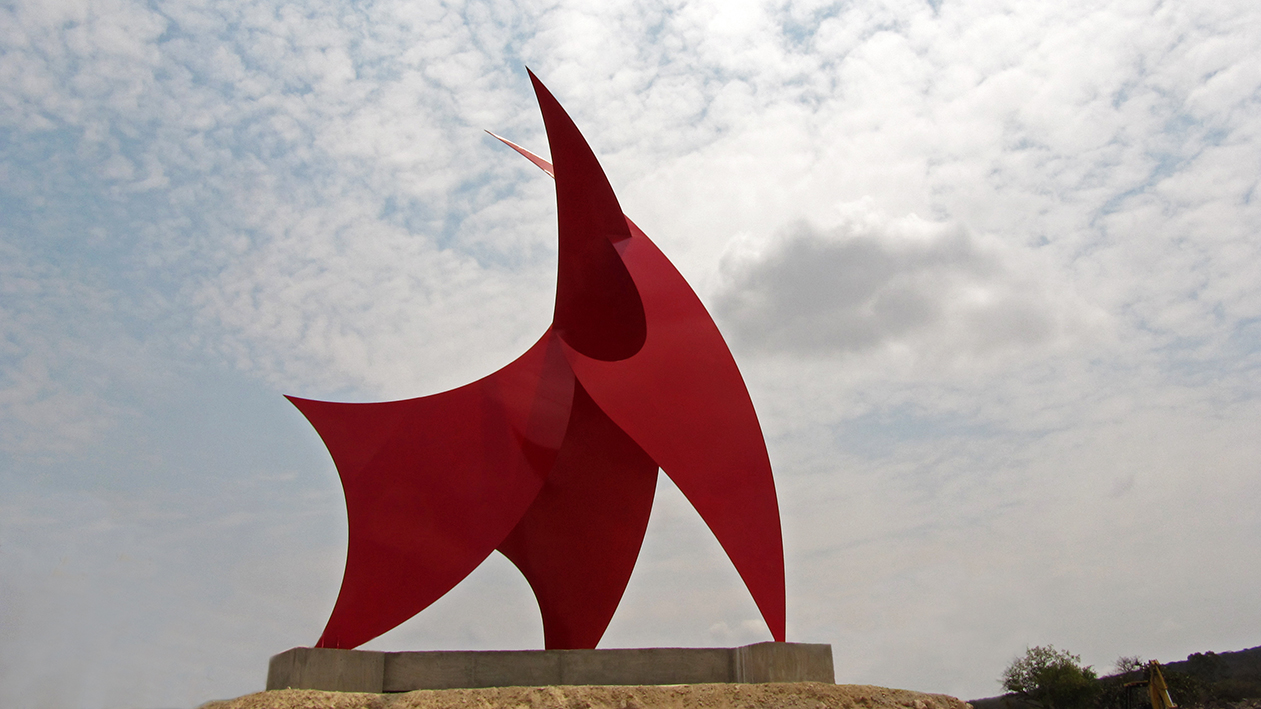
40-foot-tall high sculpture Serenity Portal

== Art therapy ==
Right from the very beginning San José shares his work with teaching sculpture both in public and private centers, which he has been doing so for more than 25 years. He is the founder and teacher during 14 years at the Sculpture workshop run by Denia Council, Alicante, Spain. Based on his experience and his ailment like anxiety, he develops the Clay Healing Technique which allows the healing of human ailment that tend to accumulate inside us as "Actives Memories". This technique focuses on the unconscious mind. After using it for two terms at a Spanish state school, he created a program designed to reduce bullying in schools. This programme is called “Seeds for Peace” and it quickly goes over the Atlantic ocean and is applied and known in Mexico where he begins the "Seeds for Peace for the World" foundation with the aim of to spread and popularize this programme all over the world through workshops, talks, seminars, taking part in Congress, etc.

In 2012 the first edition of the book “Seeds for Peace” was published. The Art Healing Technique that allows you to pass from fear to curiosity. From violence to peace.

This book is the basic tool for the development of this programme. Nowadays a second edition is on sale. The Foundation "Seeds for Peace" aims to teach for free teachers and artist this method so that can be used at schools and also through talks to help and teach the parents. This method has proved to be very successful and efficient to eradicate this type of violence (bullying).

== Published books ==
- Paseando por la Comunidad de Madrid. Arquitectura Popular.
- Semillas de Paz
