= São José do Jacuri =

Coordinates: 18°16′S 42°40′W

- Municipality
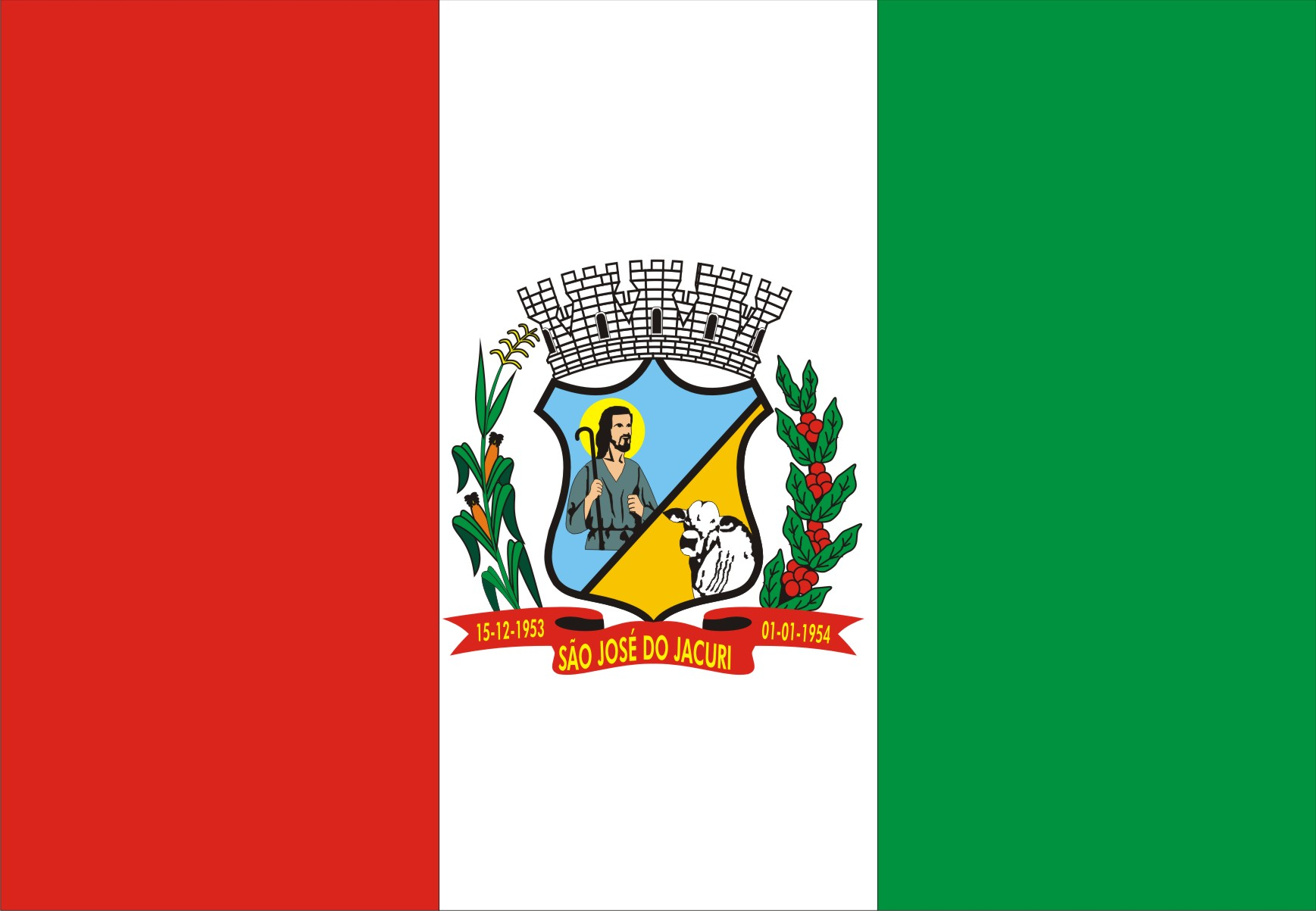
- Flag Coat of arms
- Interactive map of São José do Jacuri
- Country: Brazil
- Region: Southeast
- State: Minas Gerais
- Mesoregion: Vale do Rio Doce

Population (2022 Census)
  - Total: 6,197
  - Estimate (2025): 6,282
- Time zone: UTC−3 (BRT)

São José do Jacuri is a municipality in the state of Minas Gerais in the Southeast region of Brazil.

== See also ==
- List of municipalities in Minas Gerais
