= San José, Santa María =

Coordinates: 26°46′S 66°04′W

San José (Santa María)
- Municipality and town
- Interactive map of San José (Santa María)
- Country: Argentina
- Province: Catamarca Province
- Time zone: UTC−3 (ART)

San José (Santa María) is a town and municipality in Catamarca Province in northwestern Argentina.
