= George L. San Jose =

American business executive

- Years active: 1981-present
- Known for: Founder and CEO of The San Jose Group (SJG)

George L. San Jose, the founder and CEO of The San Jose Group (SJG), began his career in 1981 with only $247, which he used to purchase a used desk and office chair. He then built SJG into one of the largest minority-owned marketing and advertising agencies in the United States. By 2007, SJG had grown significantly, reporting $55 million in billings.

In 1988, San Jose established San Jose Consulting, the first marketing consulting group specializing in Multicultural segments, to identify and quantify share growth opportunities for U.S. Fortune 1000 clients. He further expanded his portfolio in 1990 by creating SJ Public Relations. He currently serves as president and CEO of both companies.

In 1991, San Jose founded and currently serves as chairman of The San Jose Network Ltd. (SJN), which provides services to U.S.-based corporations seeking expansion and growth opportunities in Latin American markets. Headquartered in Chicago, SJN's conglomerate of independent advertising and marketing communications agencies operates 28 offices in 15 countries, serving 32 markets across the U.S., Latin America, and Canada. The agency also works in conjunction with Synergage.

An entrepreneur, San Jose is responsible for introducing some of America's major brands to the U.S. multicultural and Latin American market consumers. Utilizing his proprietary Convergent Marketing Solutions Model, he has developed advertising campaigns that proved effective across markets of the Americas and garnered relationships with multinational clients such as Anheuser Busch, American Airlines, Coca-Cola, Hormel, S.C. Johnson, and Exelon. In 2007, San Jose became the longest-standing active president of any U.S. multicultural marketing and advertising agency.

== Early life and education ==
San Jose is the son of George D. and Thelma San Jose. He was born into a middle-class family in Havana, Cuba. His father was a financial auditor for a U.S.-owned electric company, and his mother was a judge's clerk. Most of his family was involved in the legal system, particularly his grandfather, who served as one of the five justices that made up the Supreme Court of Cuba. He was raised in a household where ethics, morals, and values were strictly enforced. This upbringing helped shape the principles that guided San Jose through all of the responsibilities and challenges in his career. In 1967, his family migrated to Spain, where they lived until they came to the United States, settling in the New York City's metro area in 1968.

From an early age, San Jose was fascinated by motorcycles and cars. Before he turned thirteen, he purchased a minibike and fully rebuilt it to go as fast as 45 miles per hour. By fifteen, he was able to buy his first car, a 1964 mustard color Mustang with a purple hand-painted stripe. When San Jose bought it, he had no idea whether he could get it to run since it hadn't started in several years. It also had no windows, dashboard, or radio. He eventually got it going. This experience helped him in later years as he worked his way through college as a full-time mechanic of old U.S. cars and European sports cars.

San Jose left high school and enlisted in the United States Air Force just two days after his 17th birthday. While serving, he pursued higher education, attending the University of Texas for a few years before completing his degree in business administration at the Ft. Lauderdale Business & Finance College in Ft. Lauderdale, Florida.

== Career ==
San Jose's first job out of college was with Ryder Truck Rentals, where he quickly rose through the ranks and set new sales records. In 1977, he returned to New York City and joined Chanty Inc., selling health and beauty aid items to wholesalers and distributors along the East and West Coast markets. While working at Chanty, San Jose wrote, directed, and produced his first TV commercial. He experienced the power of advertising firsthand when the warehouse was cleared out of the shampoo he had advertised.

Having found his lifelong passion, he continued to launch successful advertising campaigns and, in 1979, was recruited by Spanish Advertising and Marketing Services (SAMS). Established in 1962, it was the largest and oldest Hispanic marketing and advertising agency serving the U.S. Hispanic market. Hired as a manager trainee, San Jose worked closely with every advertising business unit and reported directly to the agency's President, Luis Diaz Albertini. Luis, often referred to as the “Father of Hispanic Advertising,” was a legendary executive credited with launching the U.S. Hispanic “Madison Avenue” advertising era. Luis was known for his early morning starts, often arriving at the office by 6:30 am. Recognizing an opportunity to stand out, San Jose made it a point to arrive at the same time. His dedication didn't go unnoticed, and soon, Luis took San Jose under his wing and taught him the intricacies of the business, from agency presentations to new business pitches and solving complex advertising and client challenges. San Jose was eventually appointed general manager in 1980, and by April 1981, he was entrusted with opening the Chicago SAMS office, located within offices of its parent company, D’Arcy Masius Benton Bowles.

After working for SAMS for two years, San Jose founded The San Jose Group in Chicago in 1981, a marketing and advertising agency specializing in multicultural lifestyle and behavioral marketing aimed at helping companies reach the U.S. Hispanic market in more meaningful and measurable ways. In 1985, San Jose received the Businessman of the Year Award from the Puerto Rican Chamber of Commerce, and in 1990, he received the Businessman of the Year Award from the Cuban Chamber of Commerce. In 1993, the Advertising Federation of Greater Miami recognized San Jose for his lectures at Advertising Age Seminars and the Se Habla Español Annual Conference, as well as for his creative work with Anheuser-Busch.

In 1996, San Jose co-founded the Association of Hispanic Advertising Agencies (AHAA) and served on the board, first as director and later as the treasurer until 2012. In March 2000, he was appointed chairman of the Code of Ethics and Standards of Practice for AHAA and published a guidebook for newly formed agencies.

In 1996, he was awarded The Honored Patriot Award for his service to The United States of America.

In 1999, in recognition of his commitment to community service, President Bill Clinton appointed San Jose as director and chairman of the Selective Service System Board of Appeals. San Jose was also inducted into the Who's Who in Leading American Executives in U.S. Registry in 1999.

In 2001, San Jose developed and launched the renowned God Campaign Nationwide.

In 2003, his agency's billings grew 36.5%, making it the third fastest-growing agency in Chicago. That same year, San Jose's agency became one of the 25 Most Influential Advertising Agencies in the U.S., and San Jose was nominated for an honorary Doctor of Science Degree from Northwestern University. Additionally, he led the agency to win an International Gold Quill, the highest honor in public relations, for his work with The National Pork Board.

In 2004, San Jose was featured on the cover of Screen Magazine—the leading resource for Film, Television, and Advertising—as a visionary and creative powerhouse. In 2006, San Jose led the agency to win the coveted Effie Award for its marketing communications work on the National Pork Board account. In 2005, the agency celebrated its 25th anniversary, and it had now passed the $55 million in billings mark. By this point, the San Jose Network he led had grown to 41 offices, 800 employees, and $528 million in capitalized billings, and comprised best-in-class marketing communications agencies throughout Latin America and the U.S.

In 2010, Advertising Age ranked The San Jose Group as the 18th largest agency in Chicago. That same year, San Jose formed a strategic alliance between The San Jose Network (SJN) and the Transworld Advertising Agency Network (TAAN). SJN focuses on culturally convergent markets in the U.S. and complex markets in Latin America, while TAAN leads the global advertising network, serving Europe and Asia. The alliance of these two networks created the largest marketing communications group, uniting 69 agencies across 65 countries and 87 markets with combined billings of $1.1 billion.

To celebrate the agency's 30th anniversary in 2011, San Jose initiated a community give-back effort, donating $60,000 worth of professional services to three nonprofit organizations. The donations were awarded in amounts of $30,000, $20,000, and $10,000 to organizations voted on by the public.

In 2014, San Jose created a hemispheric alliance between The San Jose Network (SJN) and The Trans-Canada Advertising Agency Network (T-CAAN), creating a one-stop shop for marketing services across the Americas. This alliance provided services across 20 countries, with 44 agencies and nearly $1 billion in capitalized billings. That same year, San Jose rolled out a multi-country advertising campaign for Bulova watches featuring the English Premier League football club Manchester United.

San Jose's marketing communications-work in this field has generated over $7.8 billion in incremental sales for household brands such as Clorox, SC Johnson, Anheuser Busch, Coca-Cola, Motorola, VISA, Fleet Bank, Sears, The Signature Group, American Family Insurance, Allstate, MetLife, ATA, MGM Resorts, Land of Lincoln HealthCare, Gift of Hope, Kraft Foods, Sara Lee, Exelon, National Pork Board, GSK, Abbott Labs, ACE Hardware, SuperValu, and Grainger. Under his leadership, The San Jose Group has won hundreds of awards, including the coveted Effie for Advertising and IABC Gold Quill for Public Relations as an acknowledgment from industry leaders and peers.

Recognized as an industry visionary by Advertising Age, USA Today, and Crain's “Who's Who,” San Jose is a frequent speaker on advertising and marketing strategy. He has also published numerous industry articles, including “Brand Centric Hispanics,” “What Happened to the USP,” “Don't Drink the Kool-Aid,” “Just because you Build it, it does not Mean they will Come,” “Latin America: The China of 2020,” “The Fragility of Brands in Culturally Blind Society,” and “The Emergence of the Power of our Polycultural Society.” The agency's work has also been featured in prominent marketing books as case studies of marketing excellence.

== Advertising techniques ==
In his advertising, San Jose employed a consumer-centric approach rooted in dramatic realism, tapping into both the aspirational and rational sides of consumers to build brand equity. He believed in identifying Global Truths—universal aspects of daily life—and positioning products and services through warmth, shared emotions, and relatable experiences. His advertising style is grounded in a deep understanding of the diverse cultural nuances that shape U.S. and Latin American consumers: rooted in truths and core values and using simple, strong, and instinctive imagery that connects with consumers’ hearts and minds. San Jose keeps a hanging folder in his credenza drawer with slips of paper, each containing ideas and inspirational thoughts drawn from everyday situations. He often refers to this collection as a source of inspiration when conceptualizing new creative ideas. In 2009, San Jose developed the Cultural Convergent Marketing Solutions Model to help create more effective communication strategies that resonate with the shared connection points across all segments of the diverse U.S. population.

== Appointments ==
San Jose sits on the Hispanic Christian Churches Association Board and has served as chairman of the U.S. Board of Appeals for the U.S. Selective Service System. He is a member of DePaul University’s Dean's Advisory Council and has also served on the boards of the Association of Hispanic Advertising Agencies and as a committee member for the Economic Club of Chicago.

== Awards and recognition ==
In 1996, San Jose was awarded The Honored Patriot Award for his service to The United States of America.

Crain's Chicago Business named San Jose to its "Who's Who in Chicago Business” list multiple times between 1990 and 2015.

In 1997, Advertising Age recognized San Jose on its "People on a Roll" list.

== Personal life ==
In 1996, San Jose founded the 501(c)(3) Harvest Christian Churches Association (HCCA) with a mission to unify and equip churches of all denominations to address the spiritual needs of their communities. He encouraged pastors to come together around shared principles and outcomes, working collaboratively to advance the tenets of the faith. As executive director, San Jose led 65 pastors and a 12-member board. He also developed “The God Campaign” and underwrote an integrated advertising campaign that supported HCCA for nearly two decades, securing over $80 million annually in pro-bono television, radio, billboard, and magazine advertising focused on general market and Hispanic inspirational messaging. In his spare time, San Jose likes to ski, play golf and upland hunt with his kids. He is a father of three sons and one daughter.

== Bibliography ==
=== Published articles ===
2013

- George L. San Jose Article on Eleven Million More Reasons to Market to Hispanics, HMW May 2013
- George L. San Jose Chimes in on how Brand Centric Hispanics Impact CPG Trends, HMW February 2013
- George L. San Jose China of 2020 Series Parts 1-7, November 2013
- George L. San Jose on Developing a Multicultural Facebook Branding Strategy, HMW February 2013
- George L. San Jose position on marketing to the reality vs the myth Don't Drink the Kool-Aid, HMW March 2013
- George L. San Jose shares his perspective on Social Media Just because you Build it it does not Mean they will Come, HMW November 2013
- Just Because You Build It Does not Mean They Will Come, Oct 2013

2014

- Are you Getting through to your Audience? January 2014
- What happened to USP? November 2014

2015

- Cuba a time such as now... September 2015
- Cuba and the U.S.- A Tale of Two Countries, January 2015

2016

- The Fragility of Brands in a Culturally Blind Society, February 2016

2017

- The Emergence of the Power of our Polycultural Society fueled by the chasm in Social Economics, 25 August 2016

=== Books ===
- San Jose Group Case study included in the “Hispanic Marketing: Connecting with the New Latino Consumer 2nd Edition” (2011).
  - Chapter 1, America Family Insurance.
- Berman, Margo. The Copywriter's Toolkit: The Complete Guide to Strategic Advertising. Massachusetts: Wiley-Blackwell. (2012).
- San Jose Group Case studies included in the “Hispanic Marketing: The Power of the New Latino Consumer 3rd Edition” (2016).
  - Chapter 3 - CASE STUDY 3.3: American Family Insurance.
  - Chapter 8. CASE STUDY 8.2: Illinois - Encuentra Algo Mas.
  - Chapter 9. CASE STUDY 9.4 Selección De Cálidad – El Reto Del Sabor.
- San Jose Group Case studies included in the “Hispanic Marketing: The Evolution of the Latino Consumer 4th Edition” (2024).
  - Case Study 6.1: The Owner Wants You Back.
