= Quemú Quemú =

Coordinates: 36°03′S 63°33′W

- Town
- Interactive map of Quemú Quemú
- Country: Argentina
- Province: La Pampa
- Time zone: UTC−3 (ART)

Quemú Quemú is a town in La Pampa Province in Argentina.
