= Ivan Novikov =

Ivan Fyodorovich Novikov (Russian: Иван Фёдорович Новиков; 12 September 1925 – 12 December 2016) was a Soviet and Russian surgeon and urologist. In 1962 Novikov proposed an endovesical procaine blockade of the ureteric orifice during kidney stone disease. In 1970 he patented a device to remove stones from the ureter.
