= San Jose Creek (Monterey County, California) =

Stream in Los Angeles County, California

- Location of the mouth of San Jose Creek

Location
- Country: United States
- State: California
- Region: Monterey County

Physical characteristics
- Source
  - location: Chamisal Ridge
  - coordinates: 36°27′59″N 121°48′35″W
  - elevation: 1,812 ft (552 m)
- Mouth: Monastery Beach, Pacific Ocean
  - location: 3.1 miles (5.0 km) south of Carmel
  - coordinates: 36°31′25″N 121°55′34″W
  - elevation: 0 ft (0 m)

Basin features
- Tributaries
  - left: Seneca Creek
  - right: North Fork San Jose Creek

San Jose Creek is a west-flowing 9.5 miles (15.3 km) stream that begins on Chamisal Ridge in the northern Santa Lucia Range in Monterey County, California. It is tributary to the Pacific Ocean at Monastery Beach

== History ==
The lands about San Jose Creek were originally inhabited by the Rumsen, a group of the Ohlone People. San Jose Creek is one of many California places named by the Spanish for Saint Joseph. It runs through the Rancho Potrero de San Carlos Spanish land grant which is now a conservation community known as the Santa Lucia Preserve.

== Ecology ==
San Jose Creek hosts spawning and rearing of federally threatened South-Central California Coast steelhead trout (Oncorhynchus mykiss) distinct population segment (DPS).
