= Duas Estradas =

- Municipality
- Flag Coat of arms

- Location in Brazil
- Coordinates: 6°41′S 35°25′W
- Country: Brazil
- Region: Northeast
- State: Paraíba
- Mesoregion: Agreste Paraibano

Population (2020)
  - Total: 3,582
- Time zone: UTC−3 (BRT)

Duas Estradas (Central northeastern portuguese pronunciation: [duɐziʃˈtɾɐdɐ]) is a municipality in the state of Paraíba in the Northeast Region of Brazil.

== See also ==
- List of municipalities in Paraíba
