= 2013 Campeonato Potiguar =

Campeonato Potiguar de Futebol
- Season: 2013
- Champions: Potiguar de Mossoró
- Relegated: Potyguar de Currais Novos
- Copa do Brasil: Potiguar de Mossoró; América; ABC
- Série D: Potiguar de Mossoró
- Copa do Nordeste: Potiguar de Mossoró; América
- Matches played: 118
- Goals scored: 278 (2.36 per match)

The 2013 Campeonato Potiguar de Futebol was the 93rd edition of the Rio Grande do Norte's top professional football league. The competition began on January 13, and ended on May 19. Potiguar de Mossoró won the championship by the 2nd time, while Potyguar de Currais Novos was relegated.

== Format ==
On the first stage, all teams excluding those who aren't playing on Copa do Nordeste play against each other team twice. The best six teams qualify to the next stage, and the worst team is relegated.

On the second teams, the six teams from the first stage are joined by América and ABC. The eight teams play against all other in each round. The four best teams in each round advance to the round's final. Each round winner advance to the championship's final. If the same team win both rounds, that team is the championship winner.

=== Qualifications ===
The best team who isn't on Campeonato Brasileiro Série A, Série B or Série C qualifies to the 2013 Campeonato Brasileiro Série D. The best three teams qualify to the 2014 Copa do Brasil. The best team in the first stage qualifies to the 2013 Copa do Brasil.

== Participating teams ==
Club	Home city	2012 result
ABC	Natal	2nd
Alecrim	Natal	9th
América-RN	Natal	1st
ASSU	Assu	5th
Baraúnas	Mossoró	3rd
Coríntians	Caicó	6th
Palmeira	Goianinha	7th
Potiguar	Mossoró	8th
Potyguar	Currais Novos	10th
Santa Cruz	Santa Cruz	4th

== First stage ==
=== Standings ===
Pos	Team	Pld	W	D	L	GF	GA	GD	Pts	Qualification or relegation
1	Santa Cruz-RN	14	9	3	2	18	8	+10	30	Advanced to the Second stage
2	Potiguar	14	7	3	4	21	10	+11	24	Advanced to the Second stage
3	Baraúnas	14	6	5	3	17	10	+7	23	Advanced to the Second stage
4	Alecrim	14	6	4	4	11	9	+2	22	Advanced to the Second stage
5	ASSU	14	6	0	8	14	13	+1	18	Advanced to the Second stage
6	Coríntians	14	4	4	6	13	16	−3	16	Advanced to the Second stage
7	Palmeira	14	4	2	8	8	21	−13	14	
8	Potyguar (R)	14	2	3	9	12	27	−15	9	Relegated

Rules for classification: 1) points; 2) goal difference; 3) number of goals scored.
(R) Relegated

=== Results ===
Home \ Away	ALE	ASU	BAR	COR	PAL	POT	PTY	SCR
Alecrim		1–0	1–1	1–0	2–1	2–0	1–2	1–0
ASSU	2–0		1–2	1–2	1–0	0–1	2–1	0–1
Baraúnas	0–0	1–0		0–0	3–0	1–1	5–1	0–1
Coríntians	0–0	1–0	0–1		1–1	2–0	3–1	1–2
Palmeira	1–0	0–3	2–1	2–1		0–4	0–0	0–1
Potiguar	1–1	1–2	2–0	3–0	1–0		5–0	1–2
Potyguar	0–1	0–1	1–2	1–1	3–0	0–1		1–1
Santa Cruz-RN	1–0	2–1	0–0	3–1	0–1	0–0	4–1	

Legend: Blue = home team win; Yellow = draw; Red = away team win.

== Second stage ==
The six teams from the first stage are joined by ABC and América-RN.

=== First round (Copa Rio Grande do Norte) ===
==== Standings ====
Pos	Team	Pld	W	D	L	GF	GA	GD	Pts	Qualification
1	América-RN	7	5	1	1	10	6	+4	16	Advanced to round's finals
2	Coríntians	7	5	1	1	15	12	+3	16	Advanced to round's finals
3	ABC	7	4	1	2	16	5	+11	13	
4	ASSU	7	4	1	2	9	12	−3	13	
5	Potiguar	7	2	2	3	11	10	+1	8	
6	Santa Cruz-RN	7	1	2	4	6	9	−3	5	
7	Alecrim	7	1	2	4	9	16	−7	5	
8	Baraúnas	7	0	2	5	4	10	−6	2	

Rules for classification: 1) points; 2) goal difference; 3) number of goals scored.

==== Results ====
Home \ Away	ABC	ALE	ARN	ASU	BAR	COR	POT	SCR
ABC				5–0		6–1		2–1
Alecrim	1–3		0–2		3–2		2–5	
América-RN	1–0			1–1		1–3		2–1
ASSU		2–1			4–2		1–0	
Baraúnas	0–0		0–1				0–0	0–1
Coríntians		1–1		3–0	1–0		4–3	
Potiguar	1–0		1–2					1–1
Santa Cruz-RN		1–1		0–1		1–2		

Legend: Blue = home team win; Yellow = draw; Red = away team win.

==== Finals ====
March 23, 2013
20:30 UTC−03:00

Coríntians	0–2	América
	Report	Cascata 28', 62'

Estádio Senador Dinarte Mariz, Caicó
Attendance: 2,397
Referee: Ítalo Medeiros de Azevedo

March 31, 2013
17:00 UTC−03:00

América	1–0	Coríntians
Tiago Adan 37'	Report

Estádio José Nazareno do Nascimento, Goianinha
Attendance: 4,131
Referee: Flávio Roberto de Lima

América Futebol Clube is the champion of the first round and qualifies to the final.

=== Second round (Copa Cidade de Natal) ===
==== Standings ====
Pos	Team	Pld	W	D	L	GF	GA	GD	Pts	Qualification
1	Potiguar	7	5	0	2	13	7	+6	15	Advanced to round's finals
2	América-RN	7	4	3	0	12	6	+6	15	Advanced to round's finals
3	Baraúnas	7	4	2	1	11	4	+7	14	
4	ABC	7	4	2	1	7	4	+3	14	
5	ASSU	7	2	2	3	5	8	−3	8	
6	Alecrim	7	2	0	5	10	10	0	6	
7	Coríntians	7	1	1	5	8	20	−12	4	
8	Santa Cruz-RN	7	1	0	6	6	13	−7	3	

Rules for classification: 1) points; 2) goal difference; 3) number of goals scored.

==== Results ====
Home \ Away	ABC	ALE	ARN	ASU	BAR	COR	POT	SCR
ABC		1–0	1–1		0–0		0–3	
Alecrim				3–1		5–0		0–2
América-RN		2–1			1–1		4–1	
ASSU	0–2		1–1			1–1		1–0
Baraúnas		2–1		0–1		3–1		
Coríntians	0–2		1–2					4–3
Potiguar		2–0		1–0	0–1	4–1		
Santa Cruz-RN	0–1		0–1		0–4		1–2	

Legend: Blue = home team win; Yellow = draw; Red = away team win.

==== Finals ====
May 05, 2013
20:30 UTC−03:00

América	0–0	Potiguar
	Report

Estádio José Nazareno do Nascimento, Goianinha
Attendance: 2,419
Referee: Ítalo Medeiros de Azevedo

May 12, 2013
16:00 UTC−03:00

Potiguar	2–1	América
Chiquinho 46'; Radamés 90'	Report	Tiago Adan 72'

Nogueirão, Mossoró
Attendance: 3,769
Referee: Leandro Vuaden

Associação Cultural e Desportiva Potiguar is the champion of the second round and qualifies to the final.

== Final stage ==
May 15, 2013
20:30 UTC−03:00

Potiguar	2–2	América
Daniel 14'; Paulinho 24'	Report	Índio Oliveira 3'; Renatinho 30'

Nogueirão, Mossoró
Attendance: 2,363
Referee: Wilson Luiz Seneme

May 19, 2013
16:00 UTC−03:00

América	1–1	Potiguar
Índio Oliveira 36'	Report	Chiquinho 76'
Penalties
Cascata (penalty scored); Renatinho (penalty missed); Índio (penalty scored); Índio Oliveira (penalty scored); Allyson (penalty scored); Itamar (penalty missed)	4-5	Chiquinho (penalty scored); Paulinho (penalty scored); Giovanni (penalty missed); Lima (penalty scored); Santos (penalty scored); Radamés (penalty scored)

Estádio Manoel Dantas Barretto, Ceará-Mirim
Attendance: 5,959
Referee: Alicio Pena Júnior

Associação Cultural e Desportiva Potiguar won the 2013 Campeonato Potiguar.
