= Messi (Brazilian footballer) =

Brazilian footballer (born 1985)

Personal information
- Full name: Jamerson Michel da Costa
- Date of birth: 10 July 1985 (age 41)
- Place of birth: Parnamirim, Brazil
- Height: 1.78 m (5 ft 10 in)
- Position: Goalkeeper

Senior career*
Years	Team	Apps	(Gls)
2009–2010	Palmeira de Goianinha		
2011	Potiguar de Parnamirim		
2012–2013	Palmeira de Goianinha		
2013	Coríntians de Caicó		
2013	Currais Novos		
2014	Palmeira de Goianinha		
2014	Globo		
2014	Força e Luz		
2015	Globo		
2015	ASSU		
2016–2017	Alecrim		
2017–2019	Palmeira de Goianinha		
2019	Atlético Potengi		
- * Club domestic league appearances and goals

Jamerson Michel da Costa (born 10 July 1985), better known as Messi, is a Brazilian former professional footballer who played as a goalkeeper.

== Career ==
The first professional goalkeeper for Palmeira de Goianinha, Messi was successful on social media due to his unusual nickname alongside other club players like Zig Zig and Pedro Pancada. During his career, he played for several clubs in Rio Grande do Norte, being part of the Globo squad that played in Campeonato Brasileiro Série D.

== Personal life ==
In 2010, Messi became the first Brazilian professional player on record to come out as gay while still pursuing his career.

== Honours ==
Globo

- Copa RN: 2014

Palmeiras de Goianinha

- Campeonato Potiguar Second Division: 2018
- Copa Robinson Faria: 2009, 2010
