= Alvinho =

Brazilian footballer

Personal information
- Full name: Álvaro Felipe da Silva
- Date of birth: 24 February 1992 (age 34)
- Place of birth: Currais Novos, Brazil
- Height: 1.82 m (6 ft 0 in)
- Position: Forward

Team information
- Current team: Potyguar Seridoense

Youth career
- –2009: Potyguar Seridoense
- 2009: Vasco da Gama

Senior career*
Years	Team	Apps	(Gls)
2009–2010	ABC		
2010	→ Potiguar de Mossoró (loan)		
2011–2011	Santa Cruz (SC)		
2012–2016	ABC		
2012	→ Baraúnas (loan)		
2013	→ Santa Cruz (SC) (loan)		
2014	→ Confiança (loan)		
2014	→ Remo (loan)		
2015	→ Campinense (loan)		
2017	Gama		
2017–2018	São Bernardo FC		
2018	Sampaio Corrêa		
2019	Água Santa		
2019	São Caetano		
2020	Votuporanguense		
2020	Pouso Alegre		
2021	Juventus-SP		
2021	América-RN		
2022	Manaus		
2022–2023	Brasiliense		
2023	Uberlândia		
2024	Taubaté		
2024	Manaus		
2025	Monte Roraima		
2025–	Potyguar Seridoense		
- * Club domestic league appearances and goals as of 4 November 2025

Álvaro Felipe da Silva (born 24 February 1992), better known as Alvinho, is a Brazilian professional footballer who plays as a forward for Potyguar Seridoense.

== Career ==
Born in Currais Novos, Alvinho played for Vasco da Gama's under-20 team in 2009. He played for ABC for most of his career, being champion in 2016. On loan, he also won the state championship for Confiança in 2014 and Campinense in 2015, where he suffered a serious tibial injury. He was also part of the champion squad of the 2018 Copa do Nordeste with Sampaio Correa, and in 2019 he was top scorer in the São Paulo Series A2 with Água Santa, and in the second semester, champion of the Copa Paulista.

In 2022 he was state champion with Manaus FC, and was later traded to Brasiliense. He played in 2023 for Uberlândia and in 2024 season for Taubaté and Manaus.

On 2025 season, Alvinho played for Monte Roraima and returned to Potyguar.

== Honours ==
ABC

- Campeonato Potiguar: 2016
- Copa Cidade do Natal: 2012
- Copa RN: 2016

Confiança

- Campeonato Sergipano: 2014

Campinense

- Campeonato Paraibano: 2015

Sampaio Corrêa

- Copa do Nordeste: 2018

São Caetano

- Copa Paulista: 2019

Pouso Alegre

- Campeonato Mineiro Módulo II: 2020

Manaus

- Campeonato Amazonense: 2022

Individual

- 2019 Campeonato Paulista Série A2 top scorer: 11 goals
