= 2012 Campeonato Potiguar =

Campeonato Rondoniense
- Season: 2012
- Champions: América
- Copa do Brasil: América; ABC
- Série D: Baraúnas

The 2012 Campeonato Potiguar is the 92nd season of Rio Grande do Norte's top professional football league. The competition began on 15 January and ended on 6 May. ABC was the defending champion.

== Participating teams ==
Club	Home city
ABC	Natal
Alecrim	Natal
América	Natal
ASSU	
Baraúnas	
Caicó	
Corintians	
Palmeira	
Potiguar	
Santa Cruz	

== First stage (Taça Cidade de Natal) ==
Pos	Team	Pld	W	D	L	GF	GA	GD	Pts	Qualification
1	ABC (A)	9	5	3	1	19	9	+10	18	Advances to the Semifinals
2	América-RN (A)	9	5	1	3	22	10	+12	16	Advances to the Semifinals
3	Santa Cruz-RN (A)	9	5	0	4	17	9	+8	15	Advances to the Semifinals
4	Coríntians (A)	9	4	3	2	11	6	+5	15	Advances to the Semifinals
5	Potiguar	9	4	1	4	12	14	−2	13	
6	Palmeira	9	4	1	4	8	11	−3	13	
7	Baraúnas	9	3	4	2	8	6	+2	13	
8	ASSU	9	3	1	5	9	15	−6	10	
9	Caicó	9	2	2	5	6	21	−15	8	
10	Alecrim	9	1	2	6	8	18	−10	5	

Updated to match(es) played on 8 December 2012. Source:
Rules for classification: 1) Points; 2) wins; 3) goal difference; 4) head-to-head (if two teams involved); 5) goals scored; 6) draw
(A) Advance to a further round

=== Semifinals ===
Team 1	Score	Team 2
ABC	2–1	Coríntians
América-RN	3–1	Santa Cruz-RN

=== Finals ===
==== First leg ====
22 February 2012

América-RN	0–1	ABC
		Alison 36'

Attendance: 2,589

==== Second leg ====
26 February 2012

ABC	1–0	América-RN
Washington 25'

Attendance: 11,046

ABC won 2-0 on aggregate. ABC first stage champions

== Second stage (Copa Rio Grande do Norte) ==
Pos	Team	Pld	W	D	L	GF	GA	GD	Pts	Qualification
1	ABC (A)	9	6	2	1	13	3	+10	20	Advances to the Semifinals
2	Baraúnas (A)	9	5	3	1	9	4	+5	18	Advances to the Semifinals
3	Santa Cruz-RN (A)	9	4	3	2	12	5	+7	15	Advances to the Semifinals
4	América-RN (A)	9	4	2	3	14	10	+4	14	Advances to the Semifinals
5	ASSU	9	4	2	3	10	9	+1	14	
6	Alecrim	9	4	1	4	12	17	−5	13	
7	Palmeira	9	1	5	3	8	11	−3	8	
8	Coríntians	9	1	6	2	9	12	−3	9	
9	Potiguar	9	1	3	5	4	8	−4	6	
10	Caicó	9	1	2	6	6	20	−14	5	

Updated to match(es) played on 8 December 2012. Source:
Rules for classification: 1) Points; 2) wins; 3) goal difference; 4) head-to-head (if two teams involved); 5) goals scored; 6) draw
(A) Advance to a further round

=== Semifinals ===
Team 1	Score	Team 2
América-RN	1–2	ABC
Caicó	1–0	Santa Cruz-RN

=== Finals ===
==== First leg ====
21 April 2012

América-RN	4–1	Baraúnas

==== Second leg ====
25 April 2012

Baraúnas	0–2	América-RN

América won 6-1 on aggregate. América second stage champions

== Championship finals ==
=== First leg ===
29 April 2012
16:00

América-RN	2–1	ABC
	report

=== Second leg ===
6 May 2012

ABC	0–2	América-RN
	report

America won 4-1 on aggregate. state champions 2012
