= Ignácio (footballer) =

Brazilian footballer (born 1996)

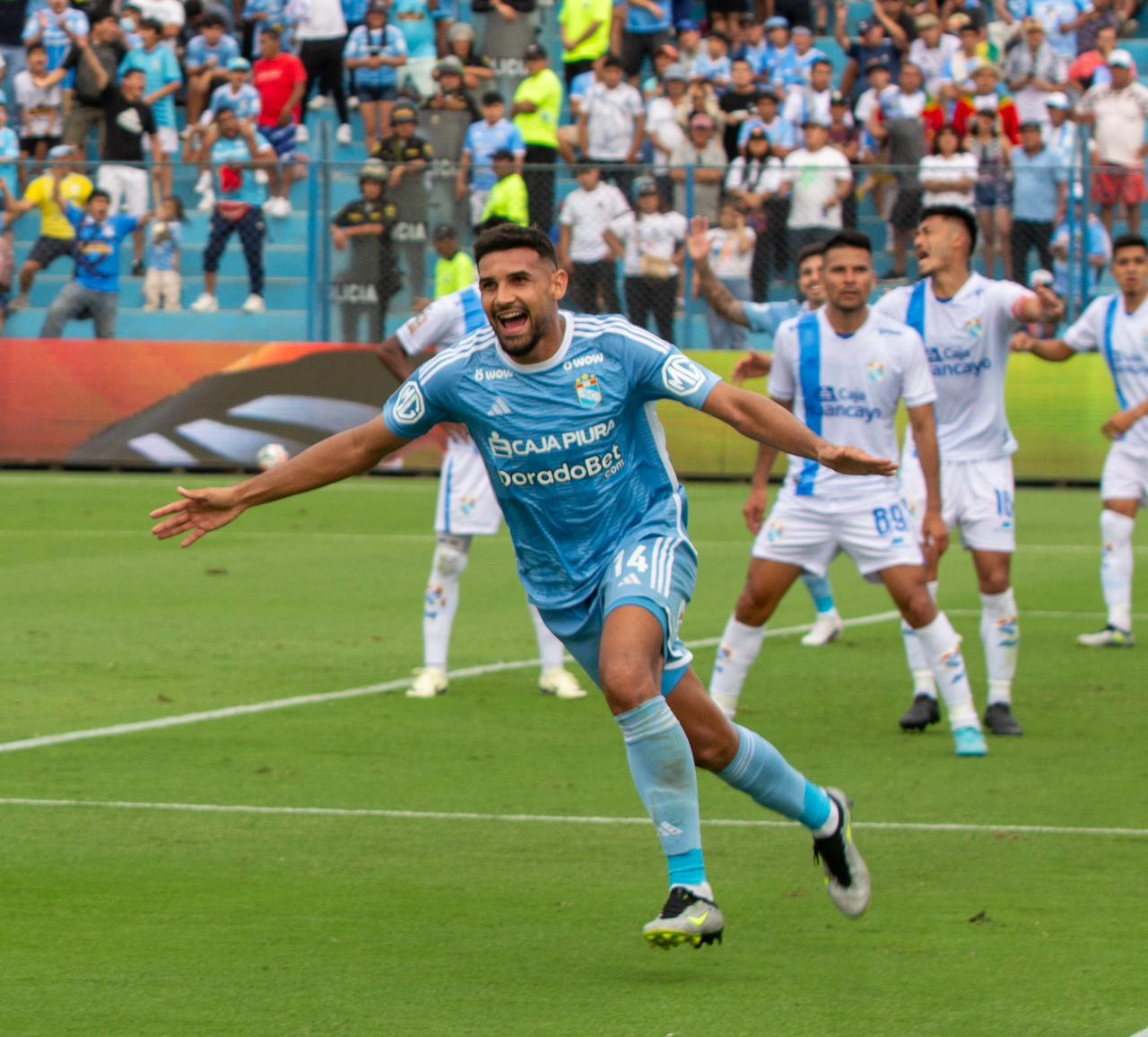
- Ignacio da Silva celebrating a goal with Sporting Cristal in 2024

Personal information
- Full name: Ignácio da Silva Oliveira
- Date of birth: 1 December 1996 (age 29)
- Place of birth: Currais Novos, Brazil
- Height: 1.90 m (6 ft 3 in)
- Position: Centre-back

Team information
- Current team: Fluminense
- Number: 4

Youth career
- 2015: Santa Cruz-RN
- 2016: Itapirense

Senior career*
| Years | Team | Apps | (Gls) |
| 2017 | VOCEM | 8 | (0) |
| 2017–2018 | Força e Luz | 19 | (2) |
| 2018 | Santa Cruz-RN | 0 | (0) |
| 2018 | → ASSU (loan) | 6 | (0) |
| 2018 | → Bahia (loan) | 1 | (0) |
| 2019–2022 | Bahia | 57 | (5) |
| 2020–2021 | → CSA (loan) | 2 | (0) |
| 2021–2022 | → Chapecoense (loan) | 24 | (2) |
| 2023–2024 | Sporting Cristal | 49 | (8) |
| 2024– | Fluminense | 44 | (0) |
- * Club domestic league appearances and goals as of 6 April 2026

Ignácio da Silva Oliveira (born 1 December 1996), simply known as Ignácio, is a Brazilian footballer who plays as a central defender for Campeonato Brasileiro Série A club Fluminense.

== Career ==
Born in Currais Novos, Rio Grande do Norte, Ignácio represented Santa Cruz-RN and Itapirense as a youth, before making his senior debut with VOCEM in 2017. Later in that year, he also played for local side Força e Luz, winning the second division of the Campeonato Potiguar.

On 12 April 2018, after impressing in the year's Potiguar, Ignácio joined Série D side ASSU on loan from Santa Cruz-RN. In July, after his club was knocked out of the competition, he moved to Bahia also on a temporary deal, and was initially assigned to their under-23 team.

Ignácio made his first team – and Série A – debut on 6 October 2018, coming on as a second-half substitute for Eric Ramires in a 2–2 away draw against Grêmio. The following 7 January, he signed a permanent deal until 2022 as the club bought 60% of his economic rights.

On 3 October 2020, after being rarely used, Ignácio was loaned to Série B side CSA until the end of the season. The following 28 May, he moved to Chapecoense also in a temporary deal.

Back to Bahia for the 2022 season, Ignácio became an undisputed starter, but still left on 21 December 2022, after failing to agree new terms. He moved abroad three days later, after signing for Peruvian Primera División side Sporting Cristal.

On 19 July 2024, Ignácio returned to his home country after being announced at Fluminense on a four-and-a-half-year contract.

== Career statistics ==
As of 25 August 2025

| Club | Season | League | | | State League | | Cup | | Continental | | Other | | Total | |
| Club | Season | Division | Apps | Goals | Apps | Goals | Apps | Goals | Apps | Goals | Apps | Goals | Apps | Goals |
|---|---|---|---|---|---|---|---|---|---|---|---|---|---|---|
| VOCEM | 2017 | Paulista 2ª Divisão | — | | 8 | 0 | — | | — | | — | | 8 | 0 |
| Força e Luz | 2017 | Potiguar 2ª Divisão | — | | 5 | 1 | — | | — | | — | | 5 | 1 |
| Força e Luz | 2018 | Potiguar | — | | 14 | 1 | — | | — | | — | | 14 | 1 |
| Força e Luz | Total | | — | | 19 | 2 | — | | — | | — | | 19 | 2 |
| ASSU | 2018 | Série D | 6 | 0 | — | | — | | — | | — | | 6 | 0 |
| Bahia | 2018 | Série A | 1 | 0 | — | | — | | — | | — | | 1 | 0 |
| Bahia | 2019 | Série A | 0 | 0 | 3 | 0 | 0 | 0 | 0 | 0 | 0 | 0 | 3 | 0 |
| Bahia | 2020 | Série A | 0 | 0 | 6 | 1 | 0 | 0 | — | | 0 | 0 | 6 | 1 |
| Bahia | 2021 | Série A | 0 | 0 | 8 | 0 | 0 | 0 | 1 (Note: Appearance(s) in Copa Sudamericana) | 0 | 2 (Note: Appearance(s) in Copa do Nordeste) | 0 | 11 | 0 |
| Bahia | 2022 | Série B | 35 | 3 | 5 | 1 | 4 | 0 | — | | 8 | 0 | 52 | 4 |
| Bahia | Total | | 36 | 3 | 22 | 2 | 4 | 0 | 1 | 0 | 10 | 0 | 73 | 5 |
| CSA (loan) | 2020 | Série B | 2 | 0 | — | | — | | — | | — | | 2 | 0 |
| CSA (loan) | 2021 | Série B | 0 | 0 | 0 | 0 | — | | — | | 1 | 0 | 1 | 0 |
| CSA (loan) | Total | | 2 | 0 | 0 | 0 | — | | — | | 1 | 0 | 3 | 0 |
| Chapecoense (loan) | 2021 | Série A | 24 | 2 | — | | 0 | 0 | — | | — | | 24 | 2 |
| Sporting Cristal | 2023 | Liga 1 | 31 | 3 | — | | — | | 12 (Note: Ten appearances and two goals in Copa Libertadores, two appearances in Copa Sudamericana) | 2 | — | | 43 | 5 |
| Sporting Cristal | 2024 | Liga 1 | 18 | 5 | — | | — | | 1 (Note: Appearance(s) in Copa Libertadores) | 0 | — | | 19 | 5 |
| Sporting Cristal | Total | | 49 | 8 | — | | — | | 13 | 2 | — | | 62 | 10 |
| Fluminense | 2024 | Série A | 4 | 0 | — | | — | | — | | — | | 4 | 0 |
| Fluminense | 2025 | Série A | 9 | 0 | 11 | 0 | 4 | 1 | 3 | 0 | 4 (Note: Appearance(s) in FIFA Club World Cup) | 0 | 31 | 1 |
| Fluminense | Total | | 13 | 0 | 11 | 0 | 4 | 1 | 3 | 0 | 4 | 0 | 35 | 1 |
| Career total | | | 130 | 13 | 60 | 4 | 8 | 1 | 17 | 2 | 15 | 0 | 230 | 20 |

== Honours ==
Força e Luz

- Campeonato Potiguar Segunda Divisão: 2017

Bahia

- Campeonato Baiano: 2019, 2020
