= Cícero Ramalho =

Brazilian footballer (born 1964)

Personal information
- Full name: Cícero Ramalho da Rocha
- Date of birth: 20 November 1964 (age 61)
- Place of birth: Mossoró, Brazil
- Height: 1.76 m (5 ft 9 in)
- Position: Forward

Youth career
- –1981: Potiguar de Mossoró

Senior career*
Years	Team	Apps	(Gls)
1982–1984	Potiguar de Mossoró		
1985–1987	Quixadá		
1987	Ceará		
1988	Quixadá		
1988	Ferroviário		
1988–1989	Real Murcia	6	(0)
1989–1991	Levante	82	(28)
1992–1993	Sabadell	9	(0)
1994	Ferroviário		
1995	Étoile du Sahel		
1995	Potiguar de Mossoró		
1996	Coríntians de Caicó		
1996–1997	América de Natal		
1997	Treze		
1998	Coríntians de Caicó		
1999	Itapipoca		
1999–2002	Baraúnas		
2005–2006	Baraúnas		
2007	Potiguar de Parnamirim		
2007	Baraúnas		
- * Club domestic league appearances and goals

Cícero Ramalho (born 20 November 1964), is a Brazilian former professional footballer, who played as a forward.

== Career ==
Cícero Ramalho began his career at Potiguar de Mossoró, and later played for Quixadá, when he was the top scorer in the 1988 state championship. He had spells at Ceará and Ferroviário, but soon moved to Real Murcia. While playing for Real Murcia, Ramalho ended up ingesting a suppository orally, which caused serious gastroenteritis that almost resulted in death. He also played in Spain for Levante and Sabadell, before returning to Ferroviário in 1994, where he became state champion.

In 2005 he gained national recognition by being the best on the field for Baraúnas, who eliminated Vasco da Gama in the Copa do Brasil. Ramalho, who had retired in 2002, weighed more than 90 kg at the time.

== Personal life ==
Cícero Ramalho became a lime producer in the Mossoró region.

== Honours ==
Ferroviário

- Campeonato Cearense: 1994

Baraúnas

- Campeonato Potiguar: 2006

Individual

- 1988 Campeonato Cearense top scorer: 15 goal
- 1995 Campeonato Potiguar top scorer: 15 goals
