= Francisco Diá =

Brazilian football manager

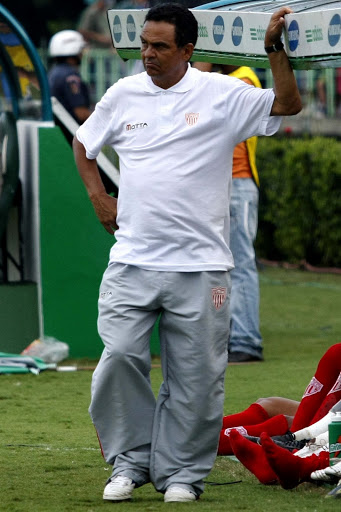
- Diá while in charge of Mogi Mirim in 2010

Personal information
- Full name: Francisco de Assis Ciríaco dos Santos
- Date of birth: 5 November 1955 (age 70)
- Place of birth: Natal, Brazil

Managerial career
- Years: Team
- 1995: Força e Luz
- 1996: ABC
- 1997: Penapolense
- 1998–2000: São Gonçalo-RN
- 2002–2003: Alecrim
- 2004: ABC
- 2006: Baraúnas (assistant)
- 2007–2008: Santa Cruz (assistant)
- 2009: Alecrim
- 2009: América de Natal
- 2010: Mogi Mirim
- 2010–2011: Botafogo-PB
- 2011: América de Natal
- 2012: Baraúnas
- 2012: Santa Cruz-RN
- 2012–2013: Icasa
- 2013: Grêmio Barueri
- 2014: Nacional-AM
- 2014: Oeste
- 2014: ASA
- 2014–2016: Campinense
- 2016: América de Natal
- 2017: Altos
- 2017–2018: Sampaio Corrêa
- 2019: Campinense
- 2020: ABC
- 2021: Ferroviário
- 2022: Juazeirense
- 2022: Pouso Alegre
- 2022: Altos
- 2022: Ferroviário
- 2023: Botafogo-PB
- 2023: Metropolitano
- 2024: Campinense
- 2025: Altos
- 2025: Sousa
- 2026: Piauí
- 2026: Sampaio Corrêa

Francisco de Assis Ciríaco dos Santos (born 5 November 1955), known as Francisco Diá, is a Brazilian football coach.

== Career ==
Born in Natal, Rio Grande do Norte, Diá started his career with hometown side Força e Luz in 1995. He took over ABC in the following year, and then worked with Penapolense, São Gonçalo-RN and Alecrim before returning to ABC in 2004.

In 2009, while in charge of Alecrim, Diá achieved promotion to the Série C with the club before leaving. In October, he was appointed América de Natal, and left the club in the following month to take over Mogi Mirim after avoiding relegation in the Série B.

Diá was sacked by Mogi in February 2010, after five consecutive defeats, and subsequently returned to América. He resigned from his latter club in March, and worked with Botafogo-PB for the remainder of the year.

Diá returned to América for a third spell in May 2011, but was relieved of his duties two months later. He was appointed at the helm of Baraúnas for the ensuing campaign in late October, and also worked at Santa Cruz-RN and Icasa throughout the 2012 campaign.

Diá was sacked by Icasa in June 2013, and took over Grêmio Barueri in August. He left in September, after five losses in five matches and a subsequent relegation to the Série D, and was named manager of Nacional-AM.

On 5 August 2014, Diá was presented at ASA, but was dismissed eight days later after just one match. He took over Campinense late in the month, and led the club to two consecutive Campeonato Paraibano titles before leaving in June 2016.

On 26 June 2016, six days after leaving Campinense, Diá returned to América for a fourth spell. He left in October after the club's relegation, and was named Altos manager for the 2017 campaign shortly after.

On 27 February 2017, Diá left Altos to manage Sampaio Corrêa. He won the year's Campeonato Maranhense and achieved promotion with the club in the season, but was sacked in May 2018 after a poor start in the second division.

On 28 July 2018, Diá returned to Campinense for the 2019 campaign, but resigned in May 2019. He returned to ABC in September, but opted to leave the club in December 2020 after refusing a wage cut.

On 17 December 2020, Diá was appointed Ferroviário manager, but resigned the following 5 September. For the 2022 season, he took over Juazeirense and Pouso Alegre before returning to Altos on 26 April. He only lasted 19 days at the latter club before being sacked on 16 May.

On 4 July 2022, Diá returned to Ferroviário, but was unable to prevent their relegation from the third division. On 23 January 2023, he replaced Moisés Egert at the helm of Botafogo-PB, but was himself sacked on 3 March.

== Managerial statistics ==
As of 7 March 2026

Managerial record by team and tenure
Team	Nat	From	To	Record							
Team	Nat	From	To	G	W	D	L	GF	GA	GD	Win %
Força e Luz	(Brazil)	1 January 1995	7 August 1995	22	5	4	13	13	36	−23	22.73
ABC	(Brazil)	1 February 1996	18 October 1996	41	20	9	12	58	39	+19	48.78
São Gonçalo	(Brazil)	31 December 1998	31 December 2000	46	18	11	17	59	56	+3	39.13
Alecrim	(Brazil)	1 January 2002	31 December 2003	22	4	6	12	27	41	−14	18.18
ABC	(Brazil)	10 January 2004	29 March 2004	14	5	6	3	26	19	+7	35.71
Icasa	(Brazil)	24 September 2012	5 June 2013	47	24	8	15	73	57	+16	51.06
ASA (interim)	(Brazil)	8 August 2014	12 August 2014	1	0	0	1	1	2	−1	0.00
Campinense	(Brazil)	6 September 2014	20 June 2016	77	40	19	18	117	58	+59	51.95
América-RN	(Brazil)	1 July 2016	19 September 2016	12	3	4	5	11	13	−2	25.00
Altos	(Brazil)	6 February 2017	27 February 2017	5	3	2	0	7	3	+4	60.00
Sampaio Corrêa-MA	(Brazil)	27 February 2017	8 May 2018	62	26	20	16	81	65	+16	41.94
Campinense	(Brazil)	27 July 2018	16 May 2019	19	7	4	8	21	19	+2	36.84
ABC	(Brazil)	24 September 2019	16 December 2020	42	23	12	7	88	33	+55	54.76
Ferroviário	(Brazil)	13 January 2021	5 September 2021	40	21	14	5	55	23	+32	52.50
Juazeirense	(Brazil)	21 December 2021	28 January 2022	2	0	1	1	3	6	−3	0.00
Pouso Alegre	(Brazil)	14 February 2022	27 April 2022	7	4	1	2	9	10	−1	57.14
Altos	(Brazil)	29 April 2022	16 May 2022	5	1	0	4	4	8	−4	20.00
Ferroviário	(Brazil)	11 July 2022	31 December 2022	4	0	1	3	3	8	−5	0.00
Botafogo-PB	(Brazil)	24 January 2023	3 March 2023	11	2	7	2	11	10	+1	18.18
Metropolitano	(Brazil)	19 July 2023	9 August 2023	3	0	0	3	3	7	−4	0.00
Campinense	(Brazil)	18 January 2024	18 March 2024	9	3	2	4	6	10	−4	33.33
Altos	(Brazil)	4 December 2024	17 March 2025	16	6	5	5	21	15	+6	37.50
Sousa	(Brazil)	16 May 2025	27 May 2025	2	0	0	2	1	3	−2	0.00
Piauí	(Brazil)	6 January 2026	9 February 2026	5	3	0	2	6	6	+0	60.00
Sampaio Corrêa-MA	(Brazil)	16 February 2026	present	0	0	0	0	0	0	+0	—
Career total				514	218	136	160	704	547	+157	42.41

== Honours ==
Botafogo-PB

- Copa Paraíba: 2010

Nacional-AM

- Campeonato Amazonense: 2014

Campinense

- Campeonato Paraibano: 2015, 2016

Sampaio Corrêa

- Campeonato Maranhense: 2017

ABC

- Campeonato Potiguar: 2020
