= Campeonato Potiguar de Futebol Feminino =

Women's football league in Rio Grande do Norte, Brazil

- Founded: 1984
- Country: Brazil
- Confederation: FNF
- Promotion to: Brasileiro Série A3
- Current champions: União (7th title) (2025)
- Most championships: União (7 titles)

The Campeonato Potiguar de Futebol Feminino is the women's football state championship of Rio Grande do Norte state, and is contested since 1984.

== List of champions ==
Following is the list with all recognized titles of Campeonato Potiguar Feminino:

Season	Champions	Runners-up
1984	Drogaria Guararapes (1)	Cidade do Sol
1985	Cidade do Sol (1)	
1986	Drogaria Guararapes (2)	
1987–2006	Not held	
2007	ABC (1)	
2008	Parnamirim (1)	ABC
2009	Potiguar de Parnamirim (1)	ABC
2010	Potiguar de Parnamirim (2)	ABC
2011	Força e Luz (1)	Monamy
2012	América (1)	Monamy
2013	Monamy (1)	Potiguar de Mossoró
2014	Not held	
2015	União (1)	Corintians
2016	Not held	
2017	União (2)	Cruzeiro
2018	Cruzeiro (1)	Palmeiras
2019	Cruzeiro (2)	União
2020	América (2)	União
2021	União (2)	Alecrim
2022	União (4)	Parnamirim
2023	União (5)	Alecrim
2024	União (6)	Potyguar Seridoense
2025	União (7)	Potyguar Seridoense

== Titles by team ==
Teams in bold stills active.

Rank	Club	Winners	Winning years
1	**União**	7	2015, 2017, 2021, 2022, 2023, 2024, 2025
2	**América**	2	2012, 2020
2	Cruzeiro	2	2018, 2019
2	Drogaria Guararapes	2	1984, 1986
2	Potiguar de Parnamirim	2	2009, 2010
4	**ABC**	1	2007
4	Cidade do Sol	1	1985
4	**Força e Luz**	1	2011
4	Monamy	1	2013
4	**Parnamirim**	1	2008

=== By city ===
City	Championships	Clubs
Natal	8	América (2), Drogaria Guararapes (2), ABC (1), Cidade do Sol (1), Força e Luz (1), Monamy (1)
Extremoz	7	União (7)
Parnamirim	3	Potiguar (2), Parnamirim (1)
Macaíba	2	Cruzeiro (2)
