= 2009 Campeonato Brasileiro Série D =

Campeonato Brasileiro Série D
- Season: 2009
- Champions: São Raimundo (1st title)
- Promoted: São Raimundo; Alecrim; Macaé; Chapecoense
- Goals: 416
- Average goals/game: 2.65
- Biggest home win: Londrina 4−0 Ypiranga, 1st Stage 3rd Round, Jul 17
- Biggest away win: Tocantins 0−4 Moto Club, 1st Stage 3rd Round, Jul 17
- Highest attendance: 45,007 − Santa Cruz 2−2 Central, 1st Stage 2nd Round, Jul 11
- Lowest attendance: 19 − Pelotas 0−1 São José, 1st Stage 5th Round, Aug 2

In 2009, the Campeonato Brasileiro Série D, the fourth division of the Brazilian Football, is currently being contested for first time in history. The competition has 40 clubs, four of which will eventually qualify to the Campeonato Brasileiro Série C to be contested in 2010.

== Competition format ==
The 40 teams are divided in ten groups of 4, playing within them in a double round-robin format. The two best ranked in each group at the end of 6 rounds will qualify to the Second Stage, which will be played in home-and-away system. Winners advance to Third Stage along with the three losers with best record in previous stages. The quarterfinal winners will be promoted to the Série C 2010. As there is no Série E, technically there will be no relegation. However, teams who were not promoted will have to re-qualify for Série D 2010 through their respective state leagues.

== Participating teams ==
Sorted by state, ordered by CBF State Ranking as of December 2007 . Each state federation has its own criteria to indicate a club to this tournament.

State	Team	City	Qualification criteria
São Paulo	Mirassol	Mirassol	Best record in 2009 State Championship
São Paulo	Paulista	Jundiaí	2nd best record in 2009 State Championship
São Paulo	Ituano	Itu	3rd best record in 2009 State Championship
Rio de Janeiro	Macaé	Macaé	Best record in 2009 State Championship
Rio de Janeiro	Friburguense^{1}	Nova Friburgo	3rd best record in 2009 State Championship
Rio de Janeiro	Madureira^{2}	Rio de Janeiro	3rd best in 2008 Copa Rio
Rio Grande do Sul	Ypiranga	Erechim	Best record in 2009 State Championship
Rio Grande do Sul	São José^{3}	Porto Alegre	5th best record in 2009 State Championship
Rio Grande do Sul	Pelotas	Pelotas	2008 Copa FGF winners
Minas Gerais	Uberaba^{4}	Uberaba	3rd best record in 2009 State Championship
Minas Gerais	Uberlândia^{4}	Uberlândia	4th best record in 2009 State Championship
Minas Gerais	Tupi	Juiz de Fora	2008 Taça Minas Gerais winners
Paraná	Corinthians Paranaense	Curitiba	Best record in 2009 State Championship
Paraná	Londrina	Londrina	2008 Copa Paraná winners
Pernambuco	Santa Cruz	Recife	Best record in 2009 State Championship
Pernambuco	Central^{5}	Caruaru	3rd best record in 2009 State Championship
Bahia	Fluminense de Feira	Feira de Santana	Best record in 2009 State Championship
Bahia	Atlético de Alagoinhas	Alagoinhas	2nd best record in 2009 State Championship
Goiás	CRAC	Catalão	2nd best record in 2009 State Championship
Goiás	Anapolina^{6}	Anápolis	5th best record in 2009 State Championship
Santa Catarina	Chapecoense	Chapecó	Best record in 2009 State Championship
Santa Catarina	Brusque	Brusque	2008 Copa Santa Catarina winners
Ceará	Ferroviário	Fortaleza	Best record in 2009 State Championship
Pará	São Raimundo	Santarém	Best record in 2009 State Championship
Rio Grande do Norte	Alecrim^{7}	Natal	6th best record in 2009 State Championship
Alagoas	CSA^{8}	Maceió	7th best record in 2009 State Championship
Distrito Federal	Brasília	Brasília	Best record in 2009 State Championship
Espírito Santo	Rio Branco	Cariacica	Best record in 2009 State Championship
Maranhão	Moto Club	São Luís	Best record in 2008 State Championship
Paraíba	Treze^{9}	Campina Grande	2009 State Championship runners-up
Mato Grosso do Sul	Naviraiense	Naviraí	2009 State Championship 1st leg winners
Amazonas	Nacional	Manaus	2009 State Championship 1st leg winners
Sergipe	Sergipe	Aracaju	Best record in 2009 State Championship
Piauí	Flamengo	Teresina	2009 State Championship winners
Mato Grosso	Araguaia	Alto Araguaia	2008 Governor's Cup winners
Acre	No representative^{10}
Rondônia	Genus^{11}	Porto Velho	2009 State Championship runners-up
Tocantins	Tocantins	Palmas	2008 State Championship winners
Amapá	Cristal	Macapá	2008 State Championship winners
Roraima	Atlético Roraima	Boa Vista	2009 State Championship winners

- ^{1} The second best team Bangu withdrew.
- ^{2} The 2008 Copa Rio would go to Copa do Brasil 2009 and the 2nd placed to Campeonato Brasileiro Série D 2009. The champion Nova Iguaçu withdrew. The 2nd placed Americano went to Copa do Brasil 2009 and the 3rd Madureira was able to Campeonato Brasileiro Série D 2009.
- ^{3} The second best team Veranópolis, 3rd Santa Cruz, and 4th Ulbra all withdrew.
- ^{4} The first best team Rio Branco de Andradas and 2nd EC Democrata both withdrew.
- ^{5} The second best team Porto withdrew.
- ^{6} The first best team Itumbiara, 3rd Santa Helena and 4th Trindade all withdrew.
- ^{7} The first best team ASSU, 2nd Potyguar Seridoense, 3rd Santa Cruz, 4th Baraúnas and 5th Potiguar all withdrew.
- ^{8} The first best team Corinthians Alagoano, 2nd Coruripe, 3rd Murici, 4th Igaci, 5th Ipanema and 6th CSE all withdrew.
- ^{9} The first best team Sousa withdrew.
- ^{10} The first best team Juventus, 2nd Atlético Acreano, 3rd Vasco da Gama and 4th Náuas all withdrew and no other team was able to represent Acre state.
- ^{11} The first best team Vilhena withdrew.

== Results ==
=== First stage ===
==== Group 1 ====
Team	Pld	W	D	L	GF	GA	GD	Pts
(Amazonas (Brazilian state)) Nacional	4	3	0	1	6	4	+2	9
(Rondônia) Genus	4	2	0	2	7	5	+2	6
Atlético Roraima	4	1	0	3	3	7	−4	3

	ARR	GEN	NAC
Atlético Roraima	—	2−1	1−2
Genus	3−0^{1}	—	1−2
Nacional	1−0	1−2	—

^{1} Match won by WO.

==== Group 2 ====
Team	Pld	W	D	L	GF	GA	GD	Pts
(Pará) São Raimundo	6	3	1	2	9	7	+2	10
(Amapá) Cristal	6	3	1	2	6	5	+1	10
(Maranhão) Moto Club	6	2	2	2	10	6	+4	8
Tocantins	6	1	2	3	6	13	−7	5

	CRI	MOC	SRA	TOC
Cristal	—	1−0	0−1	0−1
Moto Club	2−2	—	3−0	1−1
São Raimundo	0−1	2−0	—	2−2
Tocantins	1−2	0−4	1−4	—

==== Group 3 ====
Team	Pld	W	D	L	GF	GA	GD	Pts
(Ceará) Ferroviário	6	3	1	2	8	4	+4	10
(Rio Grande do Norte) Alecrim	6	3	1	2	7	5	+2	10
(Paraíba) Treze	6	2	2	2	5	7	−2	8
(Piauí) Flamengo	6	1	2	3	5	9	−4	5

	ALE	FER	FLA	TRE
Alecrim	—	1−2	1−0	2−0
Ferroviário	0−1	—	3−0	2−0
Flamengo	2−1	1−1	—	1−1
Treze	1−1	1−0	2−1	—

==== Group 4 ====
Team	Pld	W	D	L	GF	GA	GD	Pts
(Pernambuco) Central	6	3	3	0	7	4	+3	12
Sergipe	6	2	1	3	4	6	−2	7
(Alagoas) CSA	6	1	4	1	5	6	−1	7
(Pernambuco) Santa Cruz	6	1	2	3	8	8	0	5

	CEN	CSA	SCZ	SER
Central	—	0−0	1−0	1−0
CSA	1−1	—	0−3	2−0
Santa Cruz	2−2	2−2	—	1−2
Sergipe	1−2	0−0	1−0	—

==== Group 5 ====
Team	Pld	W	D	L	GF	GA	GD	Pts
(Rio de Janeiro (state)) Macaé	6	4	1	1	9	4	+5	13
(Bahia) Fluminense de Feira	6	3	1	2	10	9	+1	10
(Espírito Santo) Rio Branco	6	2	2	2	11	9	+2	8
(Bahia) Atlético de Alagoinhas	6	1	0	5	6	14	−8	3

	AAL	FLF	MAC	RBR
Atlético de Alagoinhas	—	1−2	1−2	4−2
Fluminense de Feira	3−0	—	2−1	2−2
Macaé	2−0	2−0	—	1−1
Rio Branco	3−0	3−1	0−1	—

==== Group 6 ====
Team	Pld	W	D	L	GF	GA	GD	Pts
(Minas Gerais) Tupi	6	3	2	1	4	3	+1	11
(São Paulo (state)) Paulista	6	2	3	1	4	3	+1	9
(Rio de Janeiro (state)) Madureira	6	2	2	2	9	8	+1	8
(Rio de Janeiro (state)) Friburguense	6	1	1	4	6	9	−3	4

	FRI	MAD	PTA	TUP
Friburguense	—	3−4	0−0	0−1
Madureira	1−2	—	1−2	0−0
Paulista	1−0	1−1	—	0−0
Tupi	2−1	0−2	1−0	—

==== Group 7 ====
Team	Pld	W	D	L	GF	GA	GD	Pts
(Minas Gerais) Uberaba	6	2	4	0	11	6	+5	10
(Minas Gerais) Uberlândia	6	2	4	0	10	6	+4	10
(São Paulo (state)) Mirassol	6	1	2	3	6	11	−5	5
(São Paulo (state)) Ituano	6	0	4	2	5	9	−4	4

	ITU	MIR	UBR	UBL
Ituano	—	1−4	0−0	1−1
Mirassol	0−0	—	1−4	0−3
Uberaba	2−2	2−0	—	2−2
Uberlândia	2−1	1−1	1−1	—

==== Group 8 ====
Team	Pld	W	D	L	GF	GA	GD	Pts
(Mato Grosso) Araguaia	6	5	1	0	11	6	+5	16
(Federal District (Brazil)) Brasília	6	1	3	2	11	11	0	6
(Goiás) CRAC	6	1	2	3	9	10	−1	5
(Goiás) Anapolina	6	1	2	3	9	13	−4	5

	ANA	ARA	BRA	CRAC
Anapolina	—	1−1	3−3	1−4
Araguaia	2−1	—	3−2	1−0
Brasília	2−0	1−2	—	1−1
CRAC	1−3	1−2	2−2	—

==== Group 9 ====
Team	Pld	W	D	L	GF	GA	GD	Pts
(Santa Catarina (state)) Chapecoense	6	4	1	1	13	5	+8	13
(Paraná (state)) Londrina	6	3	0	3	9	7	+2	9
(Rio Grande do Sul) Ypiranga	6	2	2	2	9	12	−3	8
(Mato Grosso do Sul) Naviraiense	6	1	1	4	5	12	−7	4

	CHA	NAV	LON	YPI
Chapecoense	—	3−0	2−0	4−3
Naviraiense	0−3	—	1−2	0−1
Londrina	2−1	0−1	—	4−0
Ypiranga	0−0	3−3	2−1	—

==== Group 10 ====
Team	Pld	W	D	L	GF	GA	GD	Pts
(Rio Grande do Sul) São José	6	4	0	2	9	6	+3	12
(Paraná (state)) Corinthians Paranaense	6	3	2	1	8	5	+3	11
(Santa Catarina (state)) Brusque	6	3	1	2	10	9	+1	10
(Rio Grande do Sul) Pelotas	6	0	1	5	4	11	−7	1

	BRU	COP	PEL	SJO
Brusque	—	1−1	4−2	0−2
Corinthians Paranaense	2−0	—	2−1	2−1
Pelotas	0−1	1−1	—	0−1
São José	2−4	1−0	2−0	—

=== Second stage ===
Team 1	Agg.	Team 2	1st leg	2nd leg
Nacional (Amazonas (Brazilian state))	3−6	(Amapá) Cristal	1−1	2−5
São Raimundo (Pará)	3−1	(Rondônia) Genus	1−1	2−0
Ferroviário (Ceará)	3−5	Sergipe	0−2	3−3
Central (Pernambuco)	1−2	(Rio Grande do Norte) Alecrim	0−2	1−0
Macaé (Rio de Janeiro (state))	3−1	(São Paulo (state)) Paulista	0−0	3−1
Tupi (Minas Gerais)	5−3	(Bahia) Fluminense de Feira	1−1	4−2
Uberaba (Minas Gerais)	4−3	(Federal District (Brazil)) Brasília	2−3	2−0
Araguaia (Mato Grosso)	4−3	(Minas Gerais) Uberlândia	2−3	2−0
Chapecoense (Santa Catarina (state))	3−0	(Paraná (state)) Corinthians Paranaense	3−0	0−0
São José (Rio Grande do Sul)	2−3	(Paraná (state)) Londrina	1−3	1−0

Teams in the left column played second match at home.

=== Third stage ===
Team 1	Agg.	Team 2	1st leg	2nd leg
Cristal (Amapá)	4−5	(Pará) São Raimundo	1−4	3−1
Alecrim (Rio Grande do Norte)	4−3	Sergipe	1−3	3−0
Macaé (Rio de Janeiro (state))	(a) 1−1	(Minas Gerais) Tupi	1−1	0−0
Araguaia (Mato Grosso)	1−2	(Minas Gerais) Uberaba	0−2	1−0
Londrina (Paraná (state))	2−3	(Santa Catarina (state)) Chapecoense	1−2	1−1

Teams in the left column play second match at home.

Three of the five 3rd stage losers qualify due to their overall record:

Team	Pld	W	D	L	GF	GA	GD	Pts
(Mato Grosso) Araguaia	10	7	1	2	16	11	+5	22
(Amapá) Cristal	10	5	2	3	16	13	+3	17
(Minas Gerais) Tupi	10	4	5	1	10	7	+3	17
Sergipe	10	4	2	4	12	13	−1	14
(Paraná (state)) Londrina	10	4	1	5	14	12	+2	13

=== Bracket ===
Quarterfinals
W1	Chapecoense (a)*	2	0
L3	Araguaia	1	1
W2	Macaé (a)*	2	2
L2	Tupi	3	1
W3	São Raimundo*	1	2
L1	Cristal	1	0
W4	Alecrim*	1	1
W5	Uberaba	0	1

Semifinals
Chapecoense*	0	3
Macaé	2	2
São Raimundo	3	2
Alecrim*	1	2

Finals
Macaé	3	1
São Raimundo (a)*	2	2

* plays second leg at home.
(p) won on penalty shootout.
(a) won by away goals rule.

=== Quarterfinals ===
Team 1	Agg.	Team 2	1st leg	2nd leg
Chapecoense (Santa Catarina (state))	(a) 2−2	(Mato Grosso) Araguaia	2−1	0−1
Macaé (Rio de Janeiro (state))	(a) 4−4	(Minas Gerais) Tupi	2−3	2−1
São Raimundo (Pará)	3−1	(Amapá) Cristal	1−1	2−0
Alecrim (Rio Grande do Norte)	2−1	(Minas Gerais) Uberaba	1−0	1−1

Teams in the left column play second match at home.

=== Semifinals ===
Team 1	Agg.	Team 2	1st leg	2nd leg
Chapecoense (Santa Catarina (state))	3−4	(Rio de Janeiro (state)) Macaé	0−2	3−2
Alecrim (Rio Grande do Norte)	3−5	(Pará) São Raimundo	1−3	2−2

Teams in the left column play second match at home.

=== Finals ===
Team 1	Agg.	Team 2	1st leg	2nd leg
São Raimundo (Pará)	(a) 4−4	(Rio de Janeiro (state)) Macaé	2−3	2−1

Teams in the left column play second match at home.

Campeonato Brasileiro Série D 2009 Winners
São Raimundo
1st Title
