= Fernando Tonet =

Brazilian football manager

Personal information
- Full name: Fernando Tonet
- Date of birth: 12 March 1970 (age 56)
- Place of birth: Caxias do Sul, Brazil

Team information
- Current team: Moto Club (head coach)

Managerial career
- Years: Team
- 2006: São José-PR
- 2007–2008: Paraná (assistant)
- 2008: Independente de Limeira
- 2009: Dom Pedro Bandeirante
- 2009: Guaxupé
- 2011: Serra
- 2011: Vilavelhense
- 2013: Piauí
- 2014: Parnahyba
- 2015: Búzios
- 2016: Alecrim
- 2016–2017: Parnahyba
- 2017: Horizonte
- 2018: Santa Cruz de Natal
- 2018: Globo
- 2019: Santa Cruz de Natal
- 2020–2021: Altos
- 2021: 4 de Julho
- 2022: Marcílio Dias
- 2022: 4 de Julho
- 2022–2023: Altos
- 2024: Potyguar Seridoense
- 2024: Potiguar Mossoró
- 2024: Alecrim
- 2025: CSE
- 2025: Decisão
- 2025: Rio Branco-PR
- 2026–: Moto Club

Fernando Tonet (born 12 March 1970) is a Brazilian football coach, currently in charge of Moto Club.

== Career ==
Born in Caxias do Sul, Rio Grande do Sul, Tonet started his career as a physiologist before being named head coach of São José-PR in 2006. He then spent two years as an assistant at Paraná before being named Independente de Limeira manager in 2008.

For the 2009 campaign, Tonet worked at Dom Pedro Bandeirante and Guaxupé. He then spent a year back at Paraná as a youth football coordinator before returning to managerial duties in 2011, with Serra; in that year, he also coached Vilavelhense.

Tonet was again a youth coordinator at Paraná during the 2012 season, but left the club to take over Piauí on 13 December. In February 2014, he was appointed Parnahyba manager, and worked at Búzios the following year.

Tonet was appointed at the helm of Alecrim on 5 January 2016, but moved back to Parnahyba in October. Dismissed by the latter club in May 2017, he took over Horizonte in July.

Tonet was appointed Santa Cruz de Natal manager for the 2018 campaign, but subsequently left the club for Globo. He was sacked on 1 June, he returned to his previous club on 12 October.

On 25 October 2019, Tonet was named Altos manager for the upcoming season. On 25 January 2021, after achieving promotion to the Série C, he renewed his contract with the club, but resigned on 20 April.

Tonet was named manager of 4 de Julho in May 2021, but resigned on 23 November and took over Marcílio Dias in the following day. Sacked on 26 April 2022, Tonet returned to 4 de Julho three days later, but left the latter on 16 May to return to Altos.

On 2 February 2023, Tonet was sacked by Altos.
