= Rafael Mariano (footballer, born 1990) =

Brazilian footballer

Personal information
- Full name: Rafael de Jesus Mariano
- Date of birth: 24 October 1990 (age 36)
- Place of birth: Pitangueiras, Brazil
- Height: 1.89 m (6 ft 2 in)
- Position: Goalkeeper

Youth career
- Primavera

Senior career*
Years	Team	Apps	(Gls)
2010	Primavera		
2011	Paraíso		
2011	Primavera		
2012	Tocantinópolis		
2012	Araguaína	1	(0)
2013	Gurupi	10	(0)
2014–2018	Globo	148	(1)
2014	→ Tocantinópolis (loan)	0	(0)
2014	→ Força e Luz (loan)	4	(0)
2016	→ América de Natal (loan)	0	(0)
2019	Água Santa	8	(0)
2019	Globo	11	(0)
2019	Força e Luz	6	(0)
2020	ABC	36	(0)
2020–2021	Manaus	18	(0)
2021	Ferroviário	21	(0)
2021	Caucaia	3	(0)
2022–2023	Concórdia	14	(0)
2022	→ Pouso Alegre (loan)	0	(0)
2022	→ Altos (loan)	13	(0)
2023	Altos	14	(0)
2023	Tuna Luso	1	(0)
2023	Figueirense	0	(0)
2024	Serra Branca-PB	8	(0)
2024	Ferroviário	0	(0)
2024	Sampaio Corrêa	8	(0)
2024	Alecrim	5	(0)
2025	Confiança	17	(0)
2025	Boavista-RJ	1	(0)
- * Club domestic league appearances and goals as of 23 October 2025

Rafael de Jesus Mariano (born 24 October 1990), simply known as Rafael Mariano, is a Brazilian professional footballer who plays as a goalkeeper.

== Career ==
Graduated in the EC Primavera from Indaiatuba, Rafael Mariano played in the first part of his career, especially for teams in the state of Tocantins. He arrived at Globo FC in 2014 where he remained until 2018. Mariano scored a goal from his own penalty area in the 2017 Campeonato Brasileiro Série C, against Guarany de Sobral.

In 2020 he was part of the state champion squad for ABC, and was then hired by Manaus FC, where in 2021 he was champion again. After some unremarkable spells, he arrived at Serra Branca in 2024, being later negotiated with Sampaio Corrêa, where he played in the 2024 Campeonato Brasileiro Série C. For the 2025 season, Rafael Mariano was hired by AD Confiança. In June, Mariano transferred to Boavista-RJ.

== Honours ==
Araguaína

- Campeonato Tocantinense Second Division: 2012

Força e Luz

- Campeonato Potiguar Second Division: 2014

ABC

- Campeonato Potiguar: 2020

Manaus

- Campeonato Amazonense: 2021

Confiança

- Campeonato Sergipano: 2025
