= Negueba (footballer, born 1999) =

Brazilian footballer

Personal information
- Full name: Luiz Henrique Soares Firmino
- Date of birth: 3 December 1999 (age 26)
- Place of birth: Ceará-Mirim, Brazil
- Height: 1.60 m (5 ft 3 in)
- Position: Forward

Team information
- Current team: Mirassol
- Number: 11

Youth career
- 2013–2019: Globo
- 2018–2019: → Fortaleza (loan)

Senior career*
| Years | Team | Apps | (Gls) |
| 2015–2021 | Globo | 59 | (25) |
| 2015 | → Força e Luz (loan) | 0 | (0) |
| 2016 | → Atlético Potengi (loan) | 2 | (0) |
| 2019–2020 | → Vitória (loan) | 6 | (0) |
| 2020 | → Santa Cruz (loan) | 8 | (0) |
| 2021 | → ABC (loan) | 14 | (7) |
| 2022– | Mirassol | 172 | (26) |
- * Club domestic league appearances and goals as of 9 April 2026

Luiz Henrique Soares Firmino (born 3 December 1999), commonly known as Negueba, is a Brazilian footballer who plays as a forward for Mirassol.

== Career ==
Born in Ceará-Mirim, Rio Grande do Norte, Negueba started his career with hometown side Globo, joining their youth sides in 2013. In February 2015, aged 15, he was registered in the first team squad of Força e Luz for the year's Campeonato Potiguar, after a partnership between both clubs were arranged.

After failing to make any appearances for Forcinha, Negueba joined Atlético Potengi in August 2016, after a partnership with Globo was established. Upon returning to Globo, he made his first team debut in 2017, before moving on loan to Fortaleza in August 2018 and returning to the youth setup.

Back to his parent club for the 2019 campaign, Negueba was the top scorer of the year's Série C, as his club was unable to avoid relegation. On 2 October, he was announced on loan at Vitória.

On 11 August 2020, after being rarely used, Negueba left Vitória and moved to Santa Cruz, also on loan. He returned to Globo in December, and scored 12 goals in the 2021 Potiguar as the club lifted the trophy.

On 27 June 2021, Negueba was loaned to ABC until the end of the year. On 10 December, he was announced at Mirassol on a permanent deal.

== Career statistics ==
As of 22 January 2024

| Club | Season | League | | | State League | | Cup | | Continental | | Other | | Total | |
| Club | Season | Division | Apps | Goals | Apps | Goals | Apps | Goals | Apps | Goals | Apps | Goals | Apps | Goals |
|---|---|---|---|---|---|---|---|---|---|---|---|---|---|---|
| Força e Luz | 2015 | Potiguar | — | | 0 | 0 | — | | — | | — | | 0 | 0 |
| Atlético Potengi (loan) | 2016 | Potiguar 2ª Divisão | — | | 2 | 0 | — | | — | | — | | 2 | 0 |
| Globo | 2017 | Série D | 0 | 0 | 1 | 0 | — | | — | | — | | 1 | 0 |
| Globo | 2018 | Série C | 6 | 0 | 3 | 0 | 0 | 0 | — | | 1 (Note: Appearance(s) in Copa do Nordeste) | 0 | 10 | 0 |
| Globo | 2019 | Série C | 17 | 8 | 9 | 4 | 0 | 0 | — | | — | | 26 | 12 |
| Globo | 2020 | Série D | 4 | 0 | — | | — | | — | | 2 | 1 | 6 | 1 |
| Globo | 2021 | Potiguar | — | | 16 | 12 | — | | — | | — | | 16 | 12 |
| Globo | Total | | 27 | 8 | 29 | 16 | 0 | 0 | — | | 3 | 1 | 59 | 25 |
| Vitória (loan) | 2019 | Série B | 1 | 0 | — | | — | | — | | — | | 1 | 0 |
| Vitória (loan) | 2020 | Série B | 0 | 0 | 5 | 0 | 0 | 0 | — | | 0 | 0 | 5 | 0 |
| Vitória (loan) | Total | | 1 | 0 | 5 | 0 | 0 | 0 | — | | 0 | 0 | 6 | 0 |
| Santa Cruz (loan) | 2020 | Série C | 8 | 0 | — | | — | | — | | — | | 8 | 0 |
| ABC (loan) | 2021 | Série D | 12 | 4 | — | | — | | — | | 2 | 3 | 14 | 7 |
| Mirassol | 2022 | Série C | 24 | 3 | 10 | 1 | 1 | 0 | — | | — | | 35 | 4 |
| Mirassol | 2023 | Série B | 35 | 4 | 13 | 2 | — | | — | | — | | 48 | 6 |
| Mirassol | 2024 | Série B | 0 | 0 | 1 | 0 | — | | — | | — | | 1 | 0 |
| Mirassol | Total | | 59 | 7 | 24 | 3 | 1 | 0 | — | | — | | 84 | 10 |
| Career total | | | 107 | 19 | 60 | 19 | 1 | 0 | 0 | 0 | 5 | 4 | 173 | 42 |
