= Campeonato Potiguar Second Division =

Football league in Brazil

- Organising body: FNF
- Founded: 1947; 79 years ago
- Country: Brazil
- State: Rio Grande do Norte
- Level on pyramid: 2
- Promotion to: Campeonato Potiguar
- Current champions: QFC (1st title) (2025)
- Most championships: Racing (7 titles)
- Website: FNF Official website

The Campeonato Potiguar Second Division is the second tier of the professional state football league in the Brazilian state of Rio Grande do Norte. It is run by the Rio Grande do Norte Football Federation (FNF).

== List of champions ==
=== Campeonato Suburbano de Natal ===
| Season | Champions | Runners-up |
|---|---|---|
| 1947 | Atlético (1) | Cruzeiro |
| 1948 | Mauá (1) | |
| 1949 | Mauá (2) | |
| 1950 | Igapó (1) | |
| 1951 | Not held | |
| 1952 | Mauá (3) | |

=== Federação de Esportes do Rio Grande do Norte ===
| Season | Champions | Runners-up |
|---|---|---|
| 1967 | Racing (1) | |
| 1968 | Racing (2) | |
| 1969 | Força e Luz (1) | |
| 1970 | Monte Castelo (1) | |
| 1971 | Palmeiras (1) | |
| 1972 | Racing (3) | |
| 1973 | Racing (4) | |
| 1974 | Racing (5) | |
| 1975 | Treze (1) | |
| 1976 | Racing (6) | |
| 1977 | Racing (7) | |
| 1978 | EMSERV (1) | |
| 1979 | Santa Cruz (1) | |
| 1980 | Ferroviário (1) | Atlético Potiguar |
| 1981 | Potiguar de Mossoró (1) | EMSERV |

=== Campeonato Potiguar Segunda Divisão ===
| Season | Champions | Runners-up |
|---|---|---|
| 1998 | CAP (1) | São Paulo |
| 1999–2000 | Not held | |
| 2001 | Potiguar de Parnamirim (1) | |
| 2002–2003 | Not held | |
| 2004 | Santa Cruz (SC) (1) | Vila Nova |
| 2005 | Macau (1) | Guamaré |
| 2006 | Guamaré (1) | Cruzeiro |
| 2007 | Potyguar Seridoense (1) | Cruzeiro |
| 2008 | Real Independente (1) | Cruzeiro |
| 2009 | Centenário (PF) (1) | Atlético Potengi |
| 2010 | ABC B (1) | Palmeira |
| 2011 | Caicó (1) | Centenário (PA) |
| 2012 | Potyguar Seridoense (2) | Currais Novos |
| 2013 | Globo (1) | Atlético Potengi |
| 2014 | Força e Luz (2) | Currais Novos |
| 2015 | ASSU (1) | Santa Cruz |
| 2016 | Santa Cruz (2) | Atlético Potiguar |
| 2017 | Força e Luz (3) | Atlético Potiguar |
| 2018 | Palmeira (1) | Alecrim |
| 2019 | Força e Luz (4) | Alecrim |
| 2020 | Palmeira (2) | Alecrim |
| 2021 | Potyguar Seridoense (3) | Riachuelo |
| 2022 | Alecrim (1) | Laguna |
| 2023 | Baraúnas (1) | Parnamirim |
| 2024 | Laguna (1) | Alecrim |
| 2025 | QFC (1) | Potyguar Seridoense |

== Titles by team ==
Teams in bold stills active.

| Rank | Club | Winners | Winning years |
|---|---|---|---|
| 1 | Racing | 7 | 1967, 1968, 1972, 1973, 1974, 1976, 1977 |
| 2 | **Força e Luz** | 4 | 1969, 2014, 2016, 2019 |
| 3 | Mauá | 3 | 1948, 1949, 1952 |
| 3 | **Potyguar Seridoense** | 3 | 2007, 2012, 2021 |
| 5 | **Palmeira** | 2 | 2018, 2020 |
| 5 | **Santa Cruz** | 2 | 1979, 2016 |
| 7 | **ABC B** | 1 | 2010 |
| 7 | **Alecrim** | 1 | 2022 |
| 7 | **ASSU** | 1 | 2015 |
| 7 | **Baraúnas** | 1 | 2023 |
| 7 | **Caicó** | 1 | 2011 |
| 7 | CAP | 1 | 1998 |
| 7 | Atlético | 1 | 1947 |
| 7 | Centenário | 1 | 2009 |
| 7 | Enserv | 1 | 1978 |
| 7 | Ferroviário | 1 | 1980 |
| 7 | Guamaré | 1 | 2006 |
| 7 | **Globo** | 1 | 2013 |
| 7 | Igapó | 1 | 1950 |
| 7 | **Laguna** | 1 | 2024 |
| 7 | Macau | 1 | 2005 |
| 7 | Monte Castelo | 1 | 1970 |
| 7 | Palmeiras | 1 | 1971 |
| 7 | **Potiguar de Mossoró** | 1 | 1981 |
| 7 | Potiguar de Parnamirim | 1 | 2001 |
| 7 | **QFC** | 1 | 2025 |
| 7 | Real Independente | 1 | 2008 |
| 7 | Santa Cruz (SC) | 1 | 2004 |
| 7 | Treze | 1 | 1975 |

=== By city ===
| City | Championships | Clubs |
|---|---|---|
| Natal | 24 | Racing (7), Força e Luz (4), Mauá (3), Santa Cruz (2), ABC B (1), Alecrim (1), Enserv (1), Ferroviário (1), Igapó (1), Monte Castelo (1), Palmeiras (1), Treze (1) |
| Currais Novos | 3 | Potyguar Seridoense (3) |
| Ceará-Mirim | 2 | Atlético (1), Globo (1) |
| Goianinha | 2 | Palmeira (2) |
| Jardim de Piranhas | 2 | CAP (1), Real Independente (1) |
| Mossoró | 2 | Baraúnas (1), Potiguar de Mossoró (1) |
| Parnamirim | 2 | Potiguar de Parnamirim (1), QFC (1) |
| Assu | 1 | ASSU (1) |
| Caicó | 1 | Caicó (1) |
| Guamaré | 1 | Guamaré (1) |
| Macau | 1 | Macau (1) |
| Pau dos Ferros | 1 | Centenário (1) |
| Santa Cruz | 1 | Santa Cruz (1) |
| Tibau do Sul | 1 | Laguna (1) |
