= Copa RN =

Football trophy

The Copa RN was a trophy organized by the Federação Norte-rio-grandense de Futebol (FNF) who currently represents the winners of the second round of the Campeonato Potiguar.

== Champions ==
List of the champions of the Copa RN of 2008 to 2022:

Season	Round	Champions	Score	Runners-up
2008	1º	ABC (1)	2–3; 3–0	Santa Cruz (SC)
2009	1º	ASSU (1)	2–2	Santa Cruz (SC)
2010	2º	ABC (2)	Round-robin	América
2011	2º	ABC (3)	Round-robin	América
2012	2º	América (1)	4–1; 2–0	Baraúnas
2013	1º (2nd stage)	América (2)	2–0; 1–0	Coríntians
2014	1º (2nd stage)	Globo (1)	Round-robin	América
2015	2º	ABC (4)	Round-robin	América
2016	2º	ABC (5)	2–0	Alecrim
2017	2º	ABC (6)	4–0; 2–1	Potiguar de Mossoró
2018	2º	ABC (7)	Round-robin	América
2019	2º	América (3)	2–1	Potiguar de Mossoró
2020	2º	ABC (8)	1–1	América
2021	2º	ABC (9)	1–1	Santa Cruz (N)
2022	2º	América (4)	0–0	ABC

=== Titles by Team ===
Rank	Club	Winners	Winning years
1	ABC	9	2008, 2010, 2011, 2015, 2016, 2017, 2018, 2020, 2021
2	América	4	2012, 2013, 2019, 2022
3	ASSU	1	2009
3	Globo	1	2014

== See also ==
- Campeonato Potiguar
- Copa Cidade do Natal
- Copa Rio Grande do Norte
