= Márcio Passos =

Brazilian footballer

Personal information
- Full name: Márcio Henrique Maia Passos
- Date of birth: 25 April 1985 (age 41)
- Place of birth: Manaus, AM, Brazil
- Height: 1.82 m (6 ft 0 in)
- Positions: Defensive midfielder; left-back

Team information
- Current team: Manaus

Senior career*
Years	Team	Apps	(Gls)
2003	Nacional de Manaus		
2004–2007	Cabofriense		
2008	Tigres do Brasil		
2009	America		
2009	Cabofriense		
2010	Rio Branco		
2010	ASA		
2011	Oeste		
2011–2014	América de Natal		
2015	Sepahan		
2015–2017	ABC		
2018	CRB		
2018	Taubaté		
2019	Manaus		
2020	URT		
2020–	Manaus		
- * Club domestic league appearances and goals as of 13 November 2026

Márcio Henrique Maia Passos (born 25 April 1985) is a Brazilian footballer played for Manaus. He is able to play as defensive midfielder and left-back.

On 28 December 2014, Márcio Passos signed a contract with Sepahan.

== Club career ==
- Last Update: 28 December 2014

Club performance			League		Cup		Continental		Total	
Season	Club	League	Apps	Goals	Apps	Goals	Apps	Goals	Apps	Goals
Brazil			League		Cup		Continental		Total	
2010	Rio Branco	Série B	16	0			-	-	16	0
2010	ASA	Série B	11	1			-	-	11	1
2011	Oeste	Série C	22	0			-	-	22	0
2011	América RN	Série C	7	1			-	-	7	1
2012	América RN	Série B	31	0	1	0	-	-	32	0
2013	América RN	Série B	33	3			-	-	33	3
2014	América RN	Série B	43	2	7	0	-	-	50	2
Iran			League		Cup		Continental		Total	
2014–15	Sepahan	Iran Pro League	2	0	0	0	-	-	2	0
Career total			164	7	8	0	0	0	172	7

== Honours ==
América de Natal

- Campeonato Potiguar: 2012, 2014

Sepahan

- Iran Pro League: 2014–15

ABC

- Copa RN: 2016, 2017
- Campeonato Potiguar: 2016, 2017

Manaus

- Campeonato Amazonense: 2019
