= Lucas Reis =

Brazilian footballer

Personal information
- Full name: Lucas dos Santos Reis
- Date of birth: 14 June 2001 (age 25)
- Place of birth: Juazeiro, Brazil
- Height: 1.90 m (6 ft 3 in)
- Position: Forward

Team information
- Current team: São Bernardo
- Number: 70

Youth career
- Juazeirense
- 2022: → São Carlos (loan)

Senior career*
Years	Team	Apps	(Gls)
2021–2022	Juazeirense	0	(0)
2021	→ Palmeira (loan)	2	(0)
2022	→ Pouso Alegre (loan)	6	(0)
2022	Atlético Pernambucano	7	(5)
2023	Botafogo-PB	3	(0)
2023	Uruaçu	8	(0)
2024	Campinense	6	(0)
2024	Metropolitano	2	(0)
2025	Altos	9	(5)
2025–	São Bernardo	6	(0)
2026	→ São José-SP (loan)	15	(5)
- * Club domestic league appearances and goals as of 18 November 2026

Lucas dos Santos Reis (born 14 June 2001), known as Lucas Reis, is a Brazilian footballer who plays as a forward for São Bernardo.

== Career ==
Born in Piri, a small village in Juazeiro, Bahia, Lucas Reis played for the youth sides of hometown side Juazeirense, but made his senior debut while on loan at Palmeira in 2021. He returned to the youth setup in January of the following year, playing for the under-20 team of São Carlos, before being announced at Pouso Alegre on 22 February 2022.

Lucas Reis ended the 2022 season at Atlético Pernambucano, before signing for Botafogo-PB on 29 November of that year. In September 2023, he agreed to a deal with Uruaçu, before returning to Paraíba with Campinense on 23 November.

On 1 December 2024, after a short spell at Metropolitano, Lucas Reis was announced at Altos. On 11 July of the following year, after being the top scorer of the Campeonato Piauiense, he joined Série C side São Bernardo.

Rarely used as Bernô achieved promotion to the Série B, Lucas Reis was loaned to São José-SP on 16 January 2026.

== Career statistics ==
As of 12 June 2026.

Club	Season	League			State League		Cup		Continental		Other		Total	
Club	Season	Division	Apps	Goals	Apps	Goals	Apps	Goals	Apps	Goals	Apps	Goals	Apps	Goals
Palmeira	2021	Potiguar 2ª Divisão	—		2	0	—		—		—		2	0
Pouso Alegre	2022	Série D	3	0	3	0	2	0	—		—		8	0
Atlético Pernambucano	2022	Pernambucano Série A2	—		7	5	—		—		—		7	5
Botafogo-PB	2023	Série C	—		3	0	0	0	—		0	0	3	0
Uruaçu	2023	Goiano 3ª Divisão	—		8	0	—		—		—		8	0
Campinense	2024	Paraibano	—		6	0	—		—		—		6	0
Metropolitano	2024	Catarinense Série B	—		2	0	—		—		—		2	0
Altos	2025	Série D	—		9	5	1	1	—		6 (Note: Appearance(s) in Copa do Nordeste)	2	16	8
São Bernardo	2025	Série C	4	0	—		—		—		—		4	0
São José	2026	Paulista A2	—		15	5	—		—		—		15	5
Career total			7	0	55	15	3	1	0	0	6	2	71	18
