= Copa Rio Grande do Norte =

- Organiser(s): FNF
- Founded: 2004
- Abolished: 2007
- Region: Rio Grande do Norte, Brazil
- Qualifier for: Copa do Brasil
- Related competitions: Campeonato Potiguar
- Most championships: Baraúnas (2 titles)

The Copa Rio Grande do Norte was the association football state cup of Rio Grande do Norte, organized by the Federação Norte-rio-grandense de Futebol (FNF), in order to decide one of the representatives of the state at the Copa do Brasil.

It was abolished after 2007, when the Campeonato Potiguar began to be played in two rounds, being one of these rounds receiving the name of Copa RN (similar to the Taça Rio in the Campeonato Carioca).

== Champions ==
Season	Champions	Runners-up
2004	Baraúnas (1)	Potiguar de Mossoró
2005	ABC (1)	Potiguar de Mossoró
2006	América (1)	ABC
2007	Baraúnas (2)	América

== See also ==
- Campeonato Potiguar
- Copa Cidade do Natal
- Copa RN
