= Matheus Pinto =

Brazilian footballer

Personal information
- Full name: Matheus dos Santos Pinto
- Date of birth: 5 October 1992 (age 34)
- Place of birth: Rio de Janeiro, Brazil
- Height: 1.76 m (5 ft 9 in)
- Position: Midfielder

Youth career
- –2012: America-RJ

Senior career*
Years	Team	Apps	(Gls)
2011–2013	America-RJ	11	(0)
2014–2016	São Cristóvão	33	(0)
2016	→ Flamengo-PI (loan)	7	(0)
2016	Resende	0	(0)
2017	Alecrim	2	(0)
2017	São Cristóvão	6	(0)
2017	Platense	4	(0)
2018	Real Sociedad	8	(0)
2019	Goytacaz	0	(0)
- * Club domestic league appearances and goals as of 14:42, 29 July 2020 (UTC)

Matheus dos Santos Pinto (born 5 October 1992) is a Brazilian footballer.

== Career statistics ==
=== Club ===
As of 17 July 2019.

Club	Season	League			State League		Cup		Continental		Other		Total	
Club	Season	Division	Apps	Goals	Apps	Goals	Apps	Goals	Apps	Goals	Apps	Goals	Apps	Goals
America-RJ	2011	–			0	0	0	0	–		11 (Note: Appearances in the Copa Rio)	1	11	1
America-RJ	2012	–			5 (Note: Appearances in the Campeonato Carioca Série B1)	0	0	0	–		6	0	11	0
America-RJ	2013	–			6	0	0	0	–		3	0	9	0
America-RJ	Total		0	0	11	0	0	0	0	0	20	1	31	1
São Cristóvão	2014	–			11 (Note: Appearances in the Campeonato Carioca Série B2)	0	0	0	–		0	0	11	0
São Cristóvão	2015	–			15	0	0	0	–		0	0	15	0
São Cristóvão	2016	–			7	0	0	0	–		0	0	7	0
São Cristóvão	Total		0	0	33	0	0	0	0	0	0	0	33	0
Flamengo-PI (loan)	2016	–			7 (Note: Appearances in the Campeonato Piauiense)	0	0	0	–		3 (Note: Appearances in the Copa do Nordeste)	0	10	0
Resende	2016	–			0	0	0	0	–		2	0	2	0
Alecrim	2017	–			2 (Note: Appearances in the Campeonato Potiguar)	0	0	0	–		0	0	2	0
São Cristóvão	2017	–			6	0	0	0	–		0	0	6	0
Platense	2017–18	Liga Salva Vida	4	0	–		0	0	2 (Note: Appearances in the CONCACAF League)	0	0	0	6	0
Real Sociedad	2017–18	Liga Salva Vida	8	0	–		0	0	0	0	0	0	8	0
Goytacaz	2019	–			0	0	0	0	–		0	0	0	0
Career total			12	0	59	0	0	2	0	0	25	1	98	1
