= Real Sociedade Independente =

Brazilian football club from Rio Grande do Norte

Real Independente
- Full name: Real Sociedade Independente
- Nickname: Concriz do Seridó (Campo troupial of the Seridó)
- Founded: May 8, 1982
- Ground: Bezerrão, Jardim de Piranhas
- Capacity: 2,000

Real Sociedade Independente is an amateur Brazilian football club from Jardim de Piranhas, Rio Grande do Norte. Established on May 8, 1982, they had a brief period of playing professionally where they won the Campeonato Potiguar Second Division in 2008, but after getting relegated in the 2009 first division, withdrew from professional level and returned to amateur status.

== Honours ==
- Campeonato Potiguar Second Division
  - Winners (1): 2008
