= Clube Laguna =

Brazilian football club

Laguna
- Full name: Clube Laguna SAF
- Founded: 2 April 2022; 4 years ago
- Ground: Estádio José Nazareno do Nascimento
- President: Rafael Eschiavi
- Head coach: Gustavo Nabinger
- League: Campeonato Brasileiro Série D Campeonato Potiguar
- 2025: Potiguar, 3rd of 8
- Website: clubelaguna.com.br
Home colors	Away colors

Clube Laguna is a Brazilian football club from Tibau do Sul, Rio Grande do Norte state.

== History ==
Founded as the first football SAF in Rio Grande do Norte, Clube Laguna stood out in particular for its sustainability proposal, and for adopting veganism as one of the club's flags and practices (similar to Forest Green Rovers).

The team was runner-up in its first professional competition, in 2022, and in 2024 managed to win the title and access to the Campeonato Potiguar.

== Honours ==
- Campeonato Potiguar Second Division
  - Winners (1): 2024

== Appearances ==
Following is the summary of Laguna appearances in Campeonato Potiguar.

Season	Division	Final position
2022	2nd	2nd
2023	2nd	5th
2024	2nd	1st
2025	1st	3rd
