= Rafael Mariano =

Rafael Mariano may refer to:

- Rafael Marques Mariano (born 1983), Brazilian football forward
- Rafael de Jesus Mariano (born 1990), Brazilian football goalkeeper
- Rafael V. Mariano, Filipino politician
