= Filipe Trindade =

Brazilian footballer (born 1999)

Personal information
- Full name: Filipe Candido da Trindade
- Date of birth: 18 July 1999 (age 27)
- Place of birth: Brasília, Brazil
- Height: 1.75 m (5 ft 9 in)
- Position: Midfielder

Team information
- Current team: CSE
- Number: 8

Youth career
- 2013–2016: PSTC
- 2016–2019: Goiás

Senior career*
Years	Team	Apps	(Gls)
2019–2021	Goiás	6	(0)
2020	→ Aparecidense (loan)	11	(0)
2021	→ Aparecidense (loan)	6	(0)
2022	Goiatuba	3	(0)
2022	União Luziense	7	(0)
2022	Contagem	6	(0)
2022	Uruaçu	2	(0)
2023	Grêmio Anápolis	4	(0)
2023	Nacional de Patos	20	(0)
2023	Mineiros	5	(0)
2024–	CSE	14	(0)
- * Club domestic league appearances and goals as of 13:30, 26 May 2024 (UTC)

Filipe Candido da Trindade (born 18 July 1999) is a Brazilian professional footballer who plays as a midfielder for CSE.

== Career ==
Trindade made his professional debut with Goiás in a 4–1 Campeonato Brasileiro Série B loss to Club Athletico Paranaense on 27 October 2019.
