= 2005 Copa do Brasil =

Copa do Brasil 2005

Tournament details
- Country: Brazil
- Dates: February 2 – June 22
- Teams: 64

Final positions
- Champions: Paulista (SP)
- Runners-up: Fluminense (RJ)

Tournament statistics
- Matches played: 117
- Goals scored: 331 (2.83 per match)
- Top goal scorer: Fred (15)

The Copa do Brasil 2005 was the 17th staging of the Copa do Brasil.

The competition started on February 2, 2005 and concluded on June 22, 2005 with the second leg of the final, held at the Estádio São Januário in Rio de Janeiro, in which Paulista lifted the trophy for the first time after a 0-0 draw with Fluminense.

Fred, of Cruzeiro, with 15 goals, was the competition's topscorer.

== Format ==
The competition was contested by 64 clubs in a knock-out format where all rounds were played over two legs and the away goals rule was used, but in the first two rounds if the away team won the first leg with an advantage of at least two goals, the second leg was not played and the club automatically qualified to the next round.

== Competition stages ==
1st Round
1	Corinthians (AL)	0
64	São Caetano (SP)	2
33	Ulbra (RS)	3 0
32	Treze (PB)	0 5
17	CFZ (DF)	0
48	Coritiba (PR)	2
49	Palmas (TO)	0 1
16	Náutico (PE)	1 3
9	Campinense (PB)	1 1
56	Fluminense (RJ)	0 3
41	Esportivo (RS)	4 0
24	Londrina (PR)	1 2
25	Bahia (BA)	2 0
40	Grêmio (RS)	1 1
57	Cuiabá (MT)	1 0
8	Vila Nova (GO)	1 2
5	Hermann Aichinger (SC)	0
60	Ituano (SP)	0
37	Coruripe (AL)	1 1
28	Fortaleza (CE)	1 3
21	Estrela do Norte (ES)	3 0
44	Atlético (MG)	4 6
53	Serra (ES)	2 2
12	Brasiliense (DF)	2 4
13	River (PI)	1 1
52	Flamengo (RJ)	1 3
45	Ypiranga (AP)	2 1
20	São Raimundo (AM)	0 3
29	União Cacoalense (RO)	0 1
36	Paysandu (PA)	1 3
61	4 de Julho (PI)	0 2
4	Ceará (CE)	0 3
3	Sampaio Corrêa (MA)	1 0
62	Corinthians (SP)	1 3
35	Cianorte (PR)	2 1
30	CENE (MS)	1 1
19	Figueirense (SC)	1 1
46	América (RJ)	0 2
51	Grêmio Coariense (AM)	1 2
14	Remo (PA)	1 4
11	São Raimundo (RR)	1
54	Botafogo (RJ)	4
43	Paulista (SP)	1 1
22	Juventude (RS)	0 1
27	SERC (MS)	1 0
38	Internacional (RS)	2 2
59	Friburguense (RJ)	4 1
6	Caldense (MG)	1 2
7	CRAC (GO)	0 1
58	Guarani (SP)	0 2
39	Potiguar (RN)	0
26	Santa Cruz (PE)	4
23	Sergipe (SE)	0 0
42	Cruzeiro (MG)	1 7
55	Ipatinga (MG)	2 2
10	Americano (RJ)	0 2
15	União (MT)	2 0
50	Vasco (RJ)	2 2
47	Rio Branco (AC)	1
18	Moto Club (MA)	3
31	Confiança (SE)	1 0
34	Vitória (BA)	0 3
63	Baraúnas (RN)	2 1 (pen: 4)
2	América (MG)	1 2 (pen: 2)

2nd Round
São Caetano (SP)	1 1
Treze (PB)	2 1
Coritiba (PR)	0 3
Náutico (PE)	1 0
Fluminense (RJ)	2 1
Esportivo (RS)	1 0
Grêmio (RS)	1 3
Vila Nova (GO)	1 1
Ituano (SP)	2 1
Fortaleza (CE)	0 2
Atlético (MG)	3
Brasiliense (DF)	1
Flamengo (RJ)	2
Ypiranga (AP)	0
Paysandu (PA)	2 0
Ceará (CE)	0 4
Corinthians (SP)	0 5
Cianorte (PR)	3 1
Figueirense (SC)	0 4
Remo (PA)	1 2
Botafogo (RJ)	1 2
Paulista (SP)	1 2
Internacional (RS)	1 4
Friburguense (RJ)	1 0
Guarani (SP)	0 0
Santa Cruz (PE)	2 0
Cruzeiro (MG)	3
Ipatinga (MG)	0
Vasco (RJ)	2 6
Moto Club (MA)	1 0
Vitória (BA)	0 1
Baraúnas (RN)	1 2

3rd Round
Treze (PB)	1 0
Coritiba (PR)	2 1
Fluminense (RJ)	3 1
Grêmio (RS)	0 0
Ituano (SP)	0 1
Atlético (MG)	0 3
Flamengo (RJ)	0 1
Ceará (CE)	2 1
Corinthians (SP)	2 0 (pen: 2)
Figueirense (SC)	0 2 (pen: 3)
Paulista (SP)	0 1 (pen: 4)
Internacional (RS)	1 0 (pen: 2)
Santa Cruz (PE)	0 1
Cruzeiro (MG)	4 0
Vasco (RJ)	2 0
Baraúnas (RN)	2 3

Quarterfinals
Treze (PB)	0 1 (pen: 8)
Fluminense (RJ)	1 0 (pen: 9)
Atlético (MG)	1 0
Ceará (CE)	1 2
Figueirense (SC)	1 0 (pen: 1)
Paulista (SP)	0 1 (pen: 3)
Cruzeiro (MG)	7 5
Baraúnas (RN)	3 0

Semifinals
Fluminense (RJ)	2 4
Ceará (CE)	2 1
Paulista (SP)	3 2
Cruzeiro (MG)	1 3

Finals
Fluminense (RJ)	0 0
Paulista (SP)	2 0

Copa do Brasil
2005 Winners
Paulista
First Title
