= Barrettão =

Stadium in Ceará-Mirim, Brazil

Estádio Manoel Dantas Barretto
- Barrettão
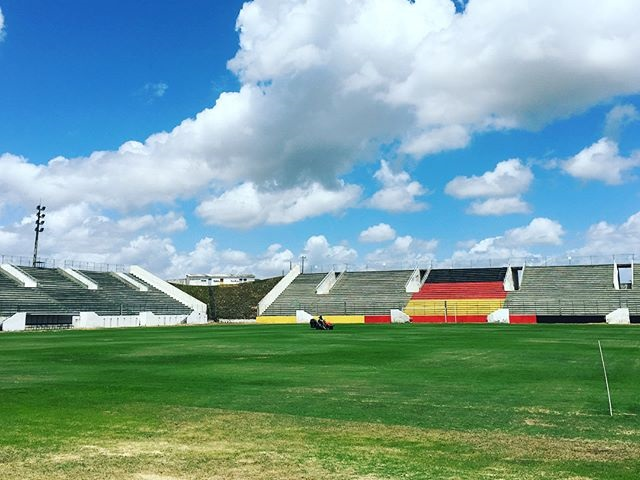
- Estádio Manoel Dantas Barretto
- Interactive map of Estádio Manoel Dantas Barretto
- Full name: Estádio Manoel Dantas Barretto
- Location: Ceará-Mirim, Rio Grande do Norte, Brazil
- Coordinates: 5°38′56″S 35°27′36″W
- Owner: Marconi Barretto
- Operator: Globo
- Capacity: 10,000
- Surface: Grass
- Record attendance: 5,959 (América de Natal v Potiguar, 19 May 2013)
- Field size: 105 x 68 m

Construction
- Groundbreaking: October 2012
- Opened: 9 May 2013

Tenant
- Globo

Estádio Manoel Dantas Barretto or Barrettão, as it is usually called is a stadium located in Ceará-Mirim, Brazil. It is used mostly for football matches and hosts the home matches of Globo. The stadium has a maximum capacity of 10,000 people.
