= Hendrich Bernardo =

Brazilian footballer (born 1986)

Personal information
- Full name: Hendrich Miller Meireles Bernardo
- Date of birth: March 2, 1986 (age 40)
- Place of birth: Natal, Brazil
- Height: 1.74 m (5 ft 9 in)
- Positions: Attacking midfielder; striker

Team information
- Current team: Santa Cruz-RN

Youth career
- 2005–2006: Atlético Mineiro

Senior career*
Years	Team	Apps	(Gls)
2007	Atlético Mineiro		
2007–2008	→ CRB (Loan)		
2008	Uberlândia		
2009	Democrata		
2009	Rio Branco	8	(1)
2010	Sousa		
2010	Central		
2011	Guarany de Sobral		
2011–	Santa Cruz-RN	4	(1)
- * Club domestic league appearances and goals

Hendrich Miller Meireles Bernardo (born March 2, 1986), is a Brazilian attacking midfielder. He currently plays for Sport Club Santa Cruz.

== Contract ==
- CRB (Loan) 5 January 2008 to 30 November 2008
- Atlético Mineiro 2 January 2008 to 31 December 2009
- Guarany de Sobral-CE 2011
