= Copa Cidade do Natal =

Football competition in Brazil

The Copa Cidade do Natal, formerly known as Taça Cidade de Natal, is a trophy organized by the Federação Norte-rio-grandense de Futebol (FNF) who currently represents the winners of the first round of the Campeonato Potiguar.

== Champions ==
List of the champions of the Copa Cidade do Natal of 2008 to 2022:

=== Taça Cidade de Natal ===
Season	Round	Champions	Score	Runners-up
2008	2º	Potiguar de Mossoró (1)	3–0; 2–3	América
2009	2º	Potyguar Seridoense (1)	1–0	ABC
2010	1º	Coríntians (1)	1–3; 2–0	América
2011	1º	Santa Cruz (SC) (1)	1–2; 4–0	ABC
2012	1º	ABC (1)	0–1; 1–0	América

=== Copa Cidade do Natal ===
Season	Round	Champions	Score	Runners-up
2013	2º (2nd stage)	Potiguar de Mossoró (2)	0–0; 2–1	América
2014	2º (2nd stage)	América (1)	Round-robin	ABC
2015	1º	América (2)	Round-robin	ABC
2016	1º	América (3)	0–0	Globo
2017	1º	Globo (1)	1–1; 2–0	ABC
2018	1º	ABC (2)	Round-robin	América
2019	1º	ABC (3)	2–1	América
2020	1º	ABC (4)	2–2	América
2021	1º	Globo (2)	2–0	América
2022	1º	ABC (5)	1–1	América

== Titles by Team ==
Rank	Club	Winners	Winning years
1	ABC	5	2012, 2018, 2019, 2020, 2022
2	América	3	2014, 2015, 2016
3	Globo	2	2017, 2021
3	Potiguar de Mossoró	2	2008, 2013
5	Coríntians	1	2010
5	Potyguar Seridoense	1	2009
5	Santa Cruz (SC)	1	2011

== See also ==
- Campeonato Potiguar
- Copa RN
- Copa Rio Grande do Norte
