= Estádio Edgar Borges Montenegro =

Brazilian football club

Coordinates: 5°35′53″S 36°54′30″W

- Edgarzão
- Interactive map of Estádio Edgar Borges Montenegro
- Location: Assu, Rio Grande do Norte, Brazil
- Owner: Liga Assuense de Desportos
- Capacity: 4,000
- Surface: Grass

Construction
- Built: 2000-2001
- Opened: October 12, 2001

Tenant
- Associação Sportiva Sociedade Unida

The Estádio Edgar Borges Montenegro, nicknamed Edgarzão, is a football stadium located in the city of Assu, in the state of Rio Grande do Norte, it belongs to the Liga Assuense de Desportos and has a maximum capacity of 4,000 people. It is the home stadium of Associação Sportiva Sociedade Unida.
