= Macau Esporte Clube =

Macau
- Full name: Macau Esporte Clube
- Nickname(s): Time Salineiro
- Founded: June 8, 1978
- Ground: Estádio Wálter Bichão, Macau, Rio Grande do Norte state, Brazil
- Capacity: 3,500
Home colours	Away colours

Macau Esporte Clube, commonly known as Macau, is a Brazilian football club based in Macau, Rio Grande do Norte state.

== History ==
The club was founded on June 8, 1978. Macau won the Campeonato Potiguar Second Level in 2005.

== Achievements ==
- Campeonato Potiguar Second Level:
  - Winners (1): 2005

== Stadium ==
Macau Esporte Clube play their home games at Estádio Wálter Bichão. The stadium has a maximum capacity of 3,500 people.
