= Estádio Municipal Coronel José Bezerra =

Football stadium in Currais Novos, Brazil

- Bezerrão
- Interactive map of Estádio Municipal Coronel José Bezerra
- Location: Currais Novos, Rio Grande do Norte, Brazil
- Coordinates: 6.27°S 36.51°W
- Owner: Currais Novos City Hall
- Capacity: 2,000

Construction
- Opened: 24 June 1967

Tenant
- Associação Cultural e Desportiva Potyguar Seridoense

The Estádio Municipal Coronel José Bezerra, nicknamed Bezerrão, is a football stadium located in Currais Novos, Rio Grande do Norte state, Brazil. It is currently used mostly for football games and is the home stadium of Associação Cultural e Desportiva Potyguar Seridoense. The stadium holds 2,000 people, and was built in 1967. The stadium is owned by the Currais Novos City Hall.

== History ==
The stadium was inaugurated on 24 June 1967. Estádio Municipal Coronel José Bezerra hosted Potyguar de Currais Novos games in the 2010 Copa do Brasil.
