= Santa Cruz Futebol Clube (Natal) =

Brazilian football club

Santa Cruz de Natal
- Full name: Santa Cruz Futebol Clube
- Nicknames: Tricolor de Natal; Santinha
- Founded: 25 December 1965; 60 years ago
- Ground: Arena das Dunas, Natal
- Capacity: 31,375
- Chairman: João Batista Nobre
- Manager: Fernando Tonet
- League: Campeonato Potiguar
- 2025 2025: Série D, 40th of 64; Potiguar, 4th of 8
Home colours	Away colours

Santa Cruz Futebol Clube, usually known as Santa Cruz or Santa Cruz de Natal, is a Brazilian football club from Natal, Rio Grande do Norte.

Santa Cruz is currently ranked fifth among Rio Grande do Norte teams in CBF's national club ranking, at 163rd place overall.

== History ==
Founded on December 25, 1965 and originally based in São Gonçalo do Amarante, they have no correlation with Santa Cruz Esporte e Cultura, state champions in 1943 and disestablished in the early 1960s.

Santa Cruz FC later won the Campeonato Potiguar Second Division in 1979 and later stopped participating in the state tournaments. They subsequently spent more than 30 years without playing, only returning to amateur competitions in 2011. Four years later, the club entered in the second division of the Potiguar, finishing second and missing out promotion as only the champion moved up to the first division.

In 2017, after being crowned champions of the second division in the previous year, Santa Cruz returned to the first division after more than 50 years, and narrowly avoided relegation. In 2018, the club finished in an impressive 3rd place, qualifying to the following year's Série D and the Copa do Brasil.

== Honours ==
- Campeonato Potiguar
  - Runners-up (1): 2024
- Campeonato Potiguar Second Division
  - Winners (2): 1979, 2016
  - Runners-up (1): 2015
