= Nogueirão =

Multi-use stadium in Mossoró, Brazil

Coordinates: 5°11′08″S 37°21′25″W

Estádio Leonardo Nogueira, usually known as Nogueirão, is a multi-use stadium located in Mossoró, Brazil. It is used mostly for football matches and hosts the home matches of the two most important teams of the city Associação Cultural Esporte Clube Baraúnas and Potiguar de Mossoró. The stadium has a maximum capacity of 25,000 people and was built in 1967.

Nogueirão is owned by the Liga Desportiva Mossoroense (Mossoró City Sporting League). The stadium is named after Manoel Leonardo Nogueira, who was the president of the city's Liga Municipal de Esportes (Municipality's Sport League) and was responsible for the stadium's construction.

== History ==
In 1967, the works on Nogueirão were completed. The inaugural match was played on June 4 of that year, when Ceará beat Mossoró City Combined Team 2–0. Ceará's Mozart scored the first goal of the stadium.

The stadium's attendance record currently stands at 18,063, set on August 11, 1985 when Flamengo beat Baraúnas 3–2.
