= Clube Centenário Pauferrense =

Brazilian football club

Centenário Pauferrense
- Full name: Clube Centenário Pauferrense
- Nicknames: O trem Carcará do Oeste
- Founded: October 31, 1956
- Ground: Estádio Nove de Janeiro, Pau dos Ferros, Rio Grande do Norte state, Brazil
- Capacity: 2,000
Home colours	Away colours

Clube Centenário Pauferrense, commonly known as Centenário Pauferrense, is a Brazilian football club based in Pau dos Ferros, Rio Grande do Norte state.

== History ==
The club was founded on October 31, 1956. They won the Campeonato Potiguar Second Level in 2009.

== Achievements ==
- Campeonato Potiguar Second Level:
  - Winners (1): 2009

== Stadium ==
Clube Centenário Pauferrense play their home games at Estádio Nove de Janeiro. The stadium has a maximum capacity of 2,000 people.
