= Uruaçu Futebol Clube =

Uruaçu FC
- Full name: Uruaçu Futebol Clube
- Founded: May 10, 1988
- Ground: Estádio Serra Grande, Uruaçu, Goiás state, Brazil
- President: Euripedes da Silveira Machado
Home colours	Away colours

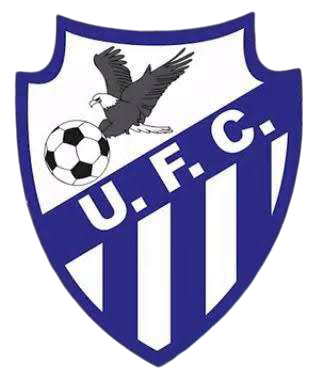
Uruaçu Futebol Clube

Uruaçu Futebol Clube is a Brazilian football club in Uruaçu, Goiás.

== History ==
It was founded on May 10, 1988.

The club played 86 matches, obtaining 31 wins, 25 draws and 30 losses. The team scored 104 goals and conceded 99.

The club's peak was in 1994, when the team played in the second division of the Goiás Championship, and finished the championship in second place.

The club's most recent participation in a professional championship was in 2002, when it played in the Third Division of the Campeonato Goiano.

In 2017 competes in local semi-professional championships.

Currently the club is legally inactive due to the lack of updating of the business register.

== Achievements ==
- Campeonato Goiano Second Division: 1990, 1991, 1992, 1994, 1995.
- Seletiva do Campeonato Goiano: 1995.
- Campeonato Goiano Third Division: 2002.

== Stadium ==
The matches of Uruaçu Futebol Clube are held at the Estádio Serra Grande belonging to the Municipal Government.
