= Macau, Rio Grande do Norte =

Municipality in Rio Grande do Norte, Brazil

Coordinates: 5°06′54″S 36°38′02″W

Macau, Brazil
- Municipality
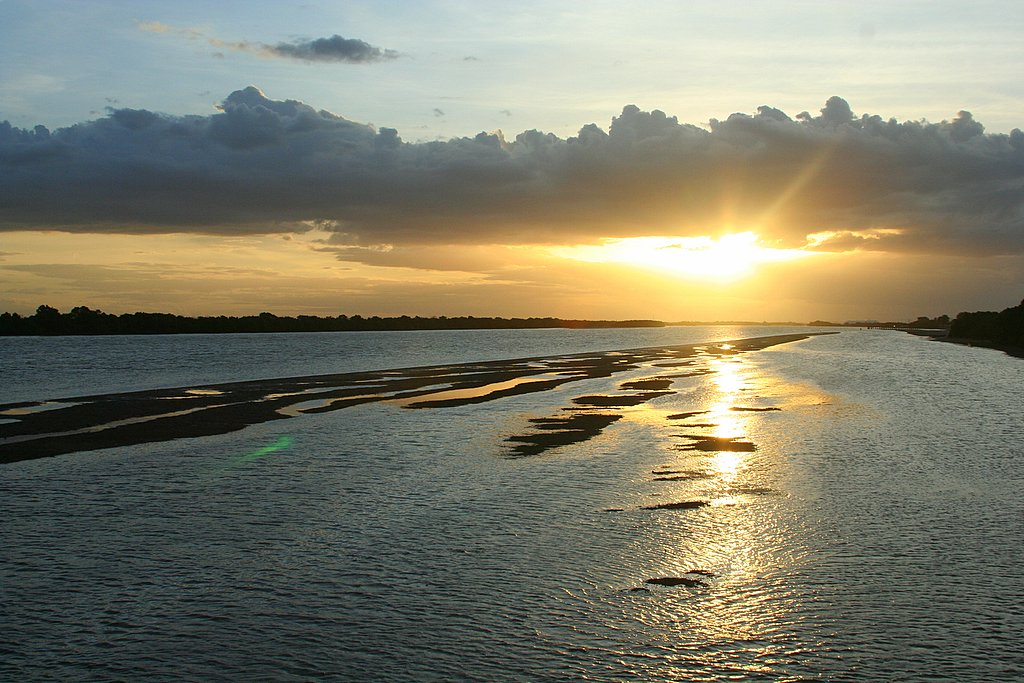
- Piranhas-Açu River in Macau.

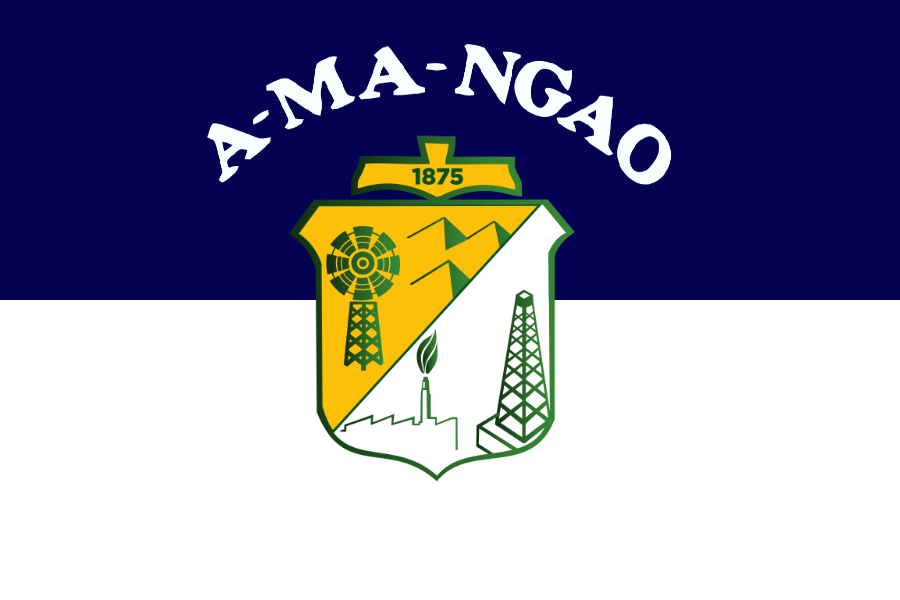
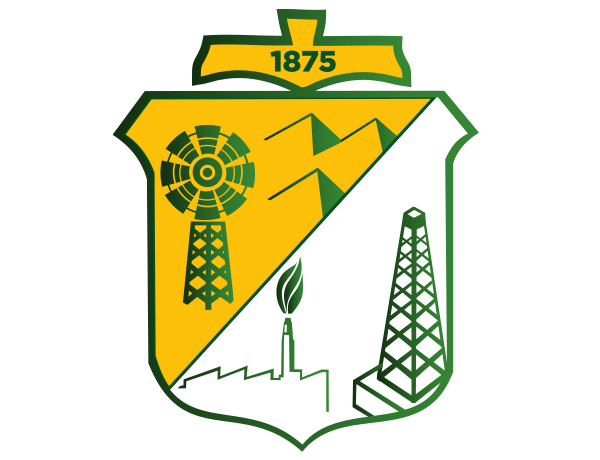
- Flag Coat of arms
- Interactive map of Macau, Brazil
- Country: Brazil
- Region: Nordeste
- State: Rio Grande do Norte
- Mesoregion: Central Potiguar

Population (2020)
  - Total: 32,039
- Time zone: UTC−3 (BRT)

Macau is a municipality in the state of Rio Grande do Norte in the Northeast region of Brazil.

== Climate ==
Climate data for Macau, Rio Grande do Norte (1981–2010)
Month	Jan	Feb	Mar	Apr	May	Jun	Jul	Aug	Sep	Oct	Nov	Dec	Year
Mean daily maximum °C (°F)	31.8 (89.2)	32.1 (89.8)	32.0 (89.6)	32.2 (90.0)	32.3 (90.1)	32.0 (89.6)	32.1 (89.8)	32.8 (91.0)	33.1 (91.6)	32.6 (90.7)	32.3 (90.1)	32.0 (89.6)	32.3 (90.1)
Mean daily minimum °C (°F)	24.7 (76.5)	24.9 (76.8)	25.0 (77.0)	24.7 (76.5)	24.5 (76.1)	23.4 (74.1)	22.8 (73.0)	22.6 (72.7)	23.1 (73.6)	23.6 (74.5)	24.2 (75.6)	24.4 (75.9)	24.0 (75.2)
Average precipitation mm (inches)	44.6 (1.76)	58.6 (2.31)	126.5 (4.98)	135.9 (5.35)	73.2 (2.88)	34.6 (1.36)	22.9 (0.90)	10.4 (0.41)	2.2 (0.09)	0.9 (0.04)	2.2 (0.09)	6.4 (0.25)	518.4 (20.41)
Average precipitation days (≥ 1.0 mm)	4	5	10	11	7	6	3	2	1	1	0	1	51
Average relative humidity (%)	73.3	75.5	77.2	78.5	75.2	73.6	68.9	67.5	66.7	67.4	69.8	70.9	72.0
Mean monthly sunshine hours	221.3	187.2	189.3	178.6	177.5	175.7	183.5	229.8	251.6	271.4	273.6	243.9	2,583.4
Source: Instituto Nacional de Meteorologia

== See also ==
- List of municipalities in Rio Grande do Norte
