= Associação Sportiva Sociedade Unida =

ASSU
- Full name: Associação Sportiva Sociedade Unida
- Nickname(s): Camaleão do Vale (Chameleon of the Valley)
- Founded: January 10, 2002; 23 years ago
- Ground: Edgarzão, Assu, Brazil
- Capacity: 4,000
- President: Dailson Machado
- Head Coach: Ademilson Almeida
- Website: https://web.archive.org/web/20110315202932/http://www.camaleaodovale.com.br/
Home colors	Away colors

Associação Sportiva Sociedade Unida, commonly known as ASSU, is a Brazilian football club from Assu, Rio Grande do Norte state. They won the Campeonato Potiguar once and competed in the Copa do Brasil once. Their colors are green and white.

ASSU is currently ranked sixth among Rio Grande do Norte teams in CBF's national club ranking, at 205th place overall.

== History ==
The club was founded on January 10, 2002. ASSU won its first title, which was the First Stage of the 2009 Campeonato Potiguar on March 1 of that year, seven years after being founded, after they tied 2–2 with Santa Cruz-RN, thus ensuring its place in the final against the winner of the Second Stage of the championship, Potyguar Seridoense, and one of the berths of Rio Grande do Norte in the 2010 Copa do Brasil. They won the Campeonato Potiguar on May 1, 2009, thus ensuring a spot in the 2009 Campeonato Brasileiro Série D. However they decided to not participate in the competition. The club won the Copa RN in 2009. ASSU competed in the Copa do Brasil in 2010, when they were eliminated in the First Stage by Atlético Goianiense.

=== Youth team ===
In 2011, the team played in the Campeonato Potiguar U-18 for the first time, when they were eliminated in the semifinals by América de Natal. The club won a spot in the 2012 Copa São Paulo de Futebol Júnior, after beating Visão Celeste 4–3 on penalty kicks in the extra game of the U-18 category, which worked as a qualification for the competition.

== Stadium ==
Associação Sportiva Sociedade Unida play their home games at Estádio Edgar Borges Montenegro, commonly known as Edgarzão. The stadium belongs to Liga Assuense de Desportos and has a maximum capacity of 4,000 people.

== Honours ==
- Campeonato Potiguar
  - Winners (1): 2009
- Copa RN
  - Winners (1): 2009
- Campeonato Potiguar Second Division
  - Winners (1): 2015

== Performance in competitions ==
=== Campeonato Potiguar - 1st Division ===
Year	Position
2002	8th
2003	5th
2004	6th
2005	3rd
2006	4th
2007	5th
2008	7th
2009	1st
2010	9th
2011	8th

Champion.

=== Copa do Brasil ===
Year	Position
2010	56th
