= Globo Futebol Clube =

Brazilian association football club based in Ceará-Mirim, Rio Grande do Norte, Brazil

Globo
- Full name: Globo Futebol Clube
- Nicknames: Águia de Ceará-Mirim (Eagle from Ceará-Mirim); Águia Querida (Beloved Eagle); Alemães (Germans)
- Founded: 18 October 2012; 13 years ago
- Ground: Barrettão
- Capacity: 10,000
- President: José Ferreira de Lima
- Head coach: Jaelson Marcelino
- League: Campeonato Potiguar
- 2025: Potiguar, 6th of 8
Home colors	Away colors

Globo Futebol Clube, commonly referred to as Globo, is a Brazilian professional club based in Ceará-Mirim, Rio Grande do Norte founded on 18 October 2012. It competes in the Campeonato Brasileiro Série D, the fourth tier of Brazilian football, as well as in the Campeonato Potiguar, the top flight of the Rio Grande do Norte state football league.

Globo is currently ranked third among Rio Grande do Norte teams in CBF's national club ranking, at 82nd place overall.

== History ==
The club was founded on the idea of the businessman Marconi Barretto that sought to honor Germany, using their colors, and the founder of Rede Globo de Televisão, Roberto Marinho, for those with admiration.

Besides businessman and president, Marconi Barretto is also a photographer recognized by the world and extracted from one of the photos, the inspiration for the club crest, which has the eagle mascot.

Created on October 18, 2012, the team start in professional football in the second half of 2013 conquering, under a foundation year, first place in the Second Division of the Campeonato Potiguar. In 2014, he was champion of Copa FNF. In the same year, the team won the First Round of the Campeonato Potiguar. The achievement came after the victory by 1–0 against Potiguar de Mossoró. With that, Globo qualified for the 2015 Copa do Nordeste, and also for being the best ranked in the Campeonato Potiguar won a place in the 2014 Campeonato Brasileiro Série D.

Globo played the Campeonato Brasileiro Série D until 2017, when they gained access to penalties on the URT, winning the game back 1x0, and on penalties for 3x2.

== Honours ==
=== National ===
- Campeonato Brasileiro Série D
  - Runners-up (1): 2017

=== State ===
- Campeonato Potiguar
  - Winners (1): 2021
  - Runners-up (2): 2014, 2017
- Campeonato Potiguar Second Division
  - Winners (1): 2013
- Copa Cidade do Natal
  - Winners (2): 2017, 2021
- Copa RN
  - Winners (1): 2014

== Stadium ==
They play their home games at the Barretão. The stadium has a maximum capacity of 10,000 people.
