= Palmeira Futebol Clube =

Palmeira
- Full name: Palmeira Futebol Clube
- Nickname(s): Verdão do Agreste; Alviverde do Agreste
- Founded: June 23, 1959
- Ground: Nazarenão, Goianinha, Rio Grande do Norte state, Brazil
- Capacity: 3,000
Home colours	Away colours

Palmeira Futebol Clube da Una, commonly known as Palmeira, is a Brazilian football club based in Goianinha, Rio Grande do Norte state.

== History ==
The club was founded on June 23, 1959. Palmeira finished in the second place in the Campeonato Potiguar Second Level in 2010, thus gaining promotion to the following year's first level.

== Stadium ==
Palmeira Futebol Clube da Una play their home games at Estádio José Nazareno do Nascimento, nicknamed Nazarenão. The stadium has a maximum capacity of 3,000 people.

== Honours ==
- Campeonato Potiguar Second Division
  - Winners (2):2018,2020
