= Santa Cruz, Rio Grande do Norte =

Municipality in Rio Grande do Norte, Brazil

Coordinates: 6°13′44″S 36°01′22″W

- Municipality
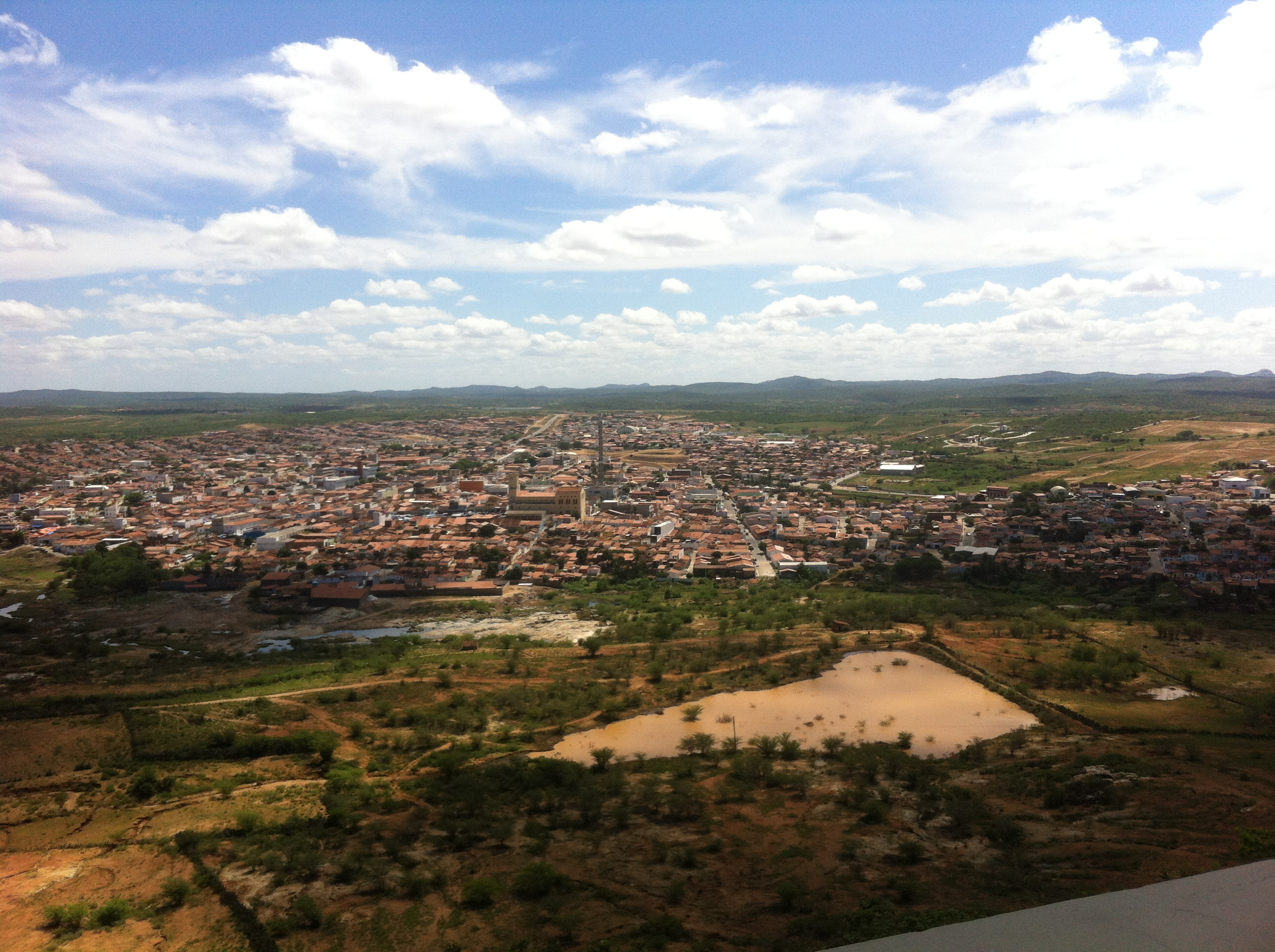
- Alto de Santa Rita de Cássia

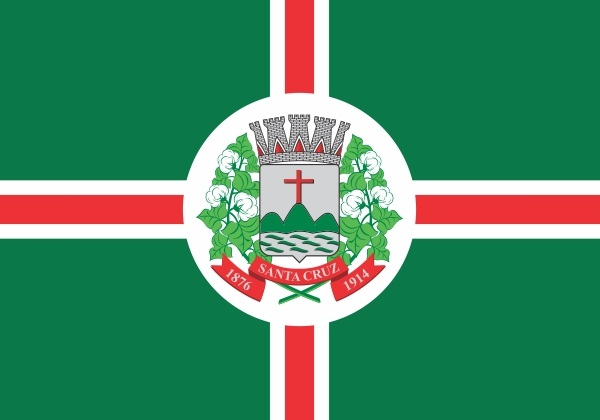
- Flag Coat of arms
- Nickname: City of Santa Rita de Cassia
- Interactive map of Santa Cruz, Rio Grande do Norte
- Country: Brazil
- Region: Nordeste
- State: Rio Grande do Norte
- Mesoregion: Agreste Potiguar

Government

Population (2020)
  - Total: 40 295
- Time zone: UTC−3 (BRT)

Santa Cruz is a municipality in the state of Rio Grande do Norte in the Northeast region of Brazil. The city is known for its St. Rita of Cascia Statue, the biggest Brazilian statue. According to the IBGE, in 2020, the city had a total population of 40,295. The city is located 115 km from Natal, the largest city and capital of Rio Grande do Norte.

The area of the municipality of Santa Cruz was originally inhabited by the current Tapuia indigenous peoples. From 1831 onwards, Lourenço da Rocha, accompanied by João da Rocha and João Rodrigues da Silva, began the settlement of the place, with an economy based on agropastoral activity, which they soon called «Malhada do Juazeiro» and then «Santa Rita of the Waterfall". Legend has it that a certain one, knowing this tradition, thought of the village and sent a cross, made with some branches of this tree. Then, in front of Santa Rita de Cássia, where all the weapons of the population of this order were, being all the weapons of this native order, there was a great order. With this fact, the village had its name changed to «Santa Cruz do Inharé». In 1835, the chapel of Santa Rita de Cássia was built, which further stimulated the growth of the village. An image of the saint, coming from the Cachoeira farm, was donated to the chapel. In the same year, provincial law no. 24, dated 27 March, elevates the village to the status of district, with the name “Santa Cruz da Ribeira do Trairi”. On the 30th of 1914, the state law 372, the village was declared inferior to the condition of a city, having its name changed to «Santa Cruz». At the same time, the district of Tangará was created, passing through the municipality to be constituted by four districts. On December 31, 1958, the districts of Tangará and Trairi were dismembered, which gave rise to the municipality of Tangará and Campo Redondo. On October 24, 1962, a ruling by the Federal Supreme Court extinguished the municipality of Campo Redondo, which returned to belonging to the municipality of Santa Cruz, but was again dismembered on March 26, 1963. Since then, the municipality of Santa Cruz has preserved its natural divisions. In November 2007, on Monte Carmelo, construction began on a statue dedicated to the patron saint of the municipality, Santa Rita de Cássia.

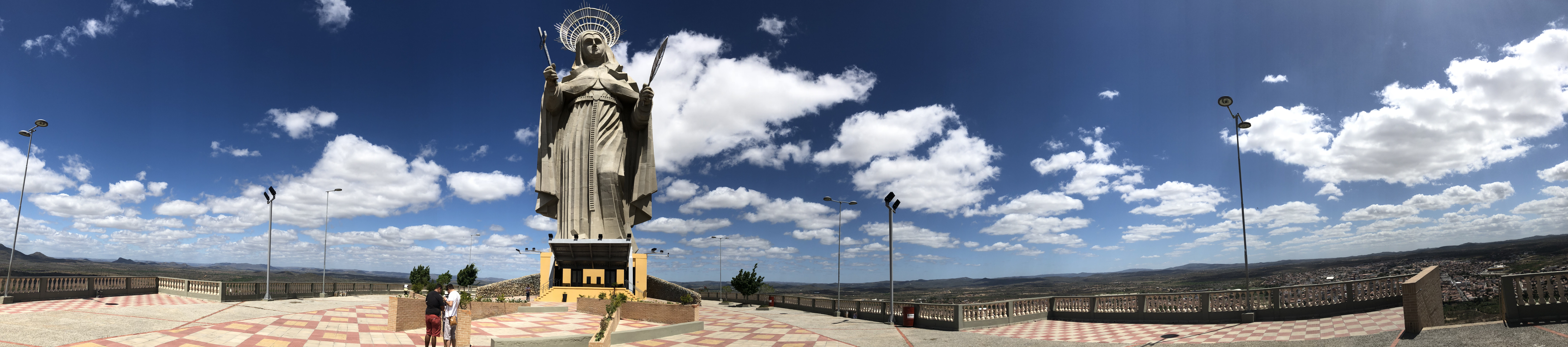
Panorama of the St.Rita Sanctuary

== See also ==
- List of municipalities in Rio Grande do Norte
