= Potiguar Esporte Clube =

Potiguar de Parnamirim
- Full name: Potiguar Esporte Clube
- Nickname(s): Avião de Parnamirim
- Founded: May 26, 1945
- Ground: Estádio Tenente Luís Gonzaga, Parnamirim, Rio Grande do Norte state, Brazil
- Capacity: 8,000
Home colours	Away colours

Potiguar Esporte Clube, commonly known as Potiguar de Parnamirim, is a Brazilian football men's and women's club based in Parnamirim, Rio Grande do Norte state. They competed in the Copa do Brasil de Futebol Feminino twice.

== History ==
The club was founded on February 15, 1946.

=== Women's team ===
The club competed in the Copa do Brasil de Futebol Feminino in 2009, when they were eliminated in the First Round by CESMAC, and in 2010, when they were eliminated in the First Round by Botafogo-PB.

== Honours ==
=== Women's Football ===
- Campeonato Potiguar de Futebol Feminino
  - Winners (2): 2009, 2010

== Stadium ==
Potiguar Esporte Clube play their home games at Estádio Tenente Luís Gonzaga. The stadium has a maximum capacity of 8,000 people.
