= Goianinha =

Municipality in Rio Grande do Norte, Brazil

- Municipality
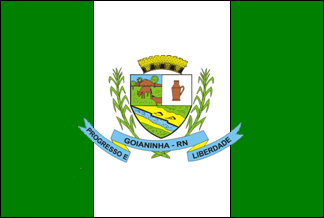
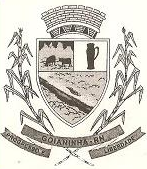
- Flag Coat of arms

- Location in Rio Grande do Norte state

- Location in Brazil
- Coordinates: 6°16′01″S 35°12′36″W
- Country: Brazil
- Region: Northeast
- State: Rio Grande do Norte

Population (2020)
  - Total: 26,669
- Time zone: UTC-03:00 (BRT)

Goianinha is a municipality in the state of Rio Grande do Norte in the Northeast region of Brazil.
