= Federação Norte-rio-grandense de Futebol =

Brazilian football state federation

- Formation: 14 July 1918; 108 years ago
- Type: List of international sport federations
- Headquarters: Natal, Rio Grande do Norte, Brazil
- Official language: Portuguese
- Website: fnf.org.br

The Federação Norte-rio-grandense de Futebol (English: Football Association of Rio Grande do Norte state) was founded on July 14, 1918, and it manages all the official football tournaments within the state of Rio Grande do Norte, which are the Campeonato Potiguar, the Campeonato Potiguar lower levels and the Copa RN, and represents the clubs at the Brazilian Football Confederation (CBF).

Old logo
