= Centro Esportivo Força e Luz =

Força e Luz
- Full name: Centro Esportivo Força e Luz
- Nickname: The Electrics
- Founded: 20 July 1966; 59 years ago
- Ground: Estádio José Nazareno do Nascimento
- Capacity: 7,000
- President: Júnior Rocha
- League: Campeonato Potiguar
- 2024: Potiguar, 6th of 8
Home colors	Away colors

Centro Esportivo Força e Luz, commonly known as Força e Luz, is a Brazilian football club based in Natal, Rio Grande do Norte.

== History ==
The club was established by employees of the Rio Grande do Norte energy concessionaire in 1966. After years of playing only in youth teams, the club returned to professionalism in 2014.

== Honours ==
=== State ===
- Campeonato Potiguar Second Division
  - Winners (4): 1969, 2014, 2017, 2019

=== Women's Football ===
- Campeonato Potiguar de Futebol Feminino
  - Winners (1): 2011

== Appearances ==
Following is the summary of Força e Luz appearances in Campeonato Potiguar, since the club return in 2014:

Season	Division	Final position
2014	2nd	1st
2015	1st	10th (relegated)
2016	2nd	4th
2017	2nd	1st
2018	1st	7th
2019	1st	8th (relegated)
2019	2nd	1st
2020	1st	3rd
2021	1st	6th
2022	1st	7th
2023	1st	5th
2024	1st	6th
2025	1st	8th (relegated)
