= Associação Cultural e Desportiva Potyguar Seridoense =

Brazilian football club

Potyguar de Currais Novos
- Full name: Associação Cultural e Desportiva Potyguar Seridoense
- Nickname(s): Leão do Seridó
- Founded: August 1, 1989
- Ground: Estádio Municipal Coronel José Bezerra, Currais Novos, Rio Grande do Norte state, Brazil
- Capacity: 2,000
- President: Antônio Marcos
- Head coach: Netinho Matias
Home colors	Away colors

Associação Cultural e Desportiva Potyguar Seridoense, commonly known as Potyguar de Currais Novos or Potyguar Seridoense, is a Brazilian football club based in Currais Novos, Rio Grande do Norte state. They competed in the Copa do Brasil once.

== History ==
The club was founded on August 1, 1989. Potyguar de Currais Novos won the Campeonato Potiguar Second Level in 2007. They competed in the Copa do Brasil in 2010, when they were eliminated in the First Round by Paysandu.

== Honours ==
- Campeonato Potiguar
  - Runners-up (1): 2009
- Campeonato Potiguar Second Division
  - Winners (3): 2007, 2012, 2021
- Copa Cidade do Natal
  - Winners (1): 2009

== Stadium ==
Associação Cultural e Desportiva Potyguar Seridoense play their home games at Estádio Municipal Coronel José Bezerra. The stadium has a maximum capacity of 2,000 people.
