= Associação Cultural Esporte Clube Baraúnas =

Baraúnas
- Full name: Associação Cultural; Esporte Clube Baraúnas
- Nicknames: Leão; Leão do Oeste; Baru
- Founded: January 14, 1960 (65 years ago)
- Ground: Nogueirão, Mossoró, Brazil
- Capacity: 25,000
- Chairman: João Dehon da Rocha
- Manager: Hugo Sales
- League: Campeonato Potiguar Segunda Divisão
- 2025: Potiguar Segunda Divisão, 3rd of 7
Home colours	Away colours

Associação Cultural Esporte Clube Baraúnas, or Baraúnas as they are usually called, is a Brazilian football team from Mossoró in Rio Grande do Norte, founded on January 14, 1960.

== History ==
In 1924, Baraúnas was initially a carnival block (meaning bloco carnavalesco in Portuguese).

Some of the members of this block, on January 14, 1960, founded Esporte Clube Baraúnas.

In 1966, Esporte Clube Baraúnas changed its name to Associação Cultural Esporte Clube Baraúnas.

In 1989, Baraúnas competed in the Campeonato Brasileiro Série B, being eliminated in the first stage.

In 1998, the club competed in the Campeonato Brasileiro Série C, being eliminated in the first stage.

In 2005, Baraúnas competed in the Copa do Brasil for the first time. In the first stage, the club beat América Mineiro, in the second stage, the club beat Vitória, in the third stage, Baraúnas beat Vasco da Gama, but in the quarterfinals, the club was eliminated by Cruzeiro.

In 2006, Baraúnas won its first state championship, beating its rival, Potiguar de Mossoró, in the final. Baraúnas' Luciano Paraíba was the competition's top goalscorer, with 11 goals.

== Honours ==
=== State ===
- Campeonato Potiguar
  - Winners (1): 2006
  - Runners-up (2): 1981, 1987
- Copa Rio Grande do Norte
  - Winners (2): 2004, 2007
- Campeonato Potiguar Second Division
  - Winners (1): 2023
- Torneio Início do Rio Grande do Norte
  - Winners (2): 1981, 1988

=== City ===
- Campeonato Mossoroense
  - Winners (10): 1961, 1962, 1963, 1964, 1967, 1972, 1977, 1982, 1983, 1989
- Torneio Início do Campeonato Mossoroense
  - Winners (6): 1961, 1962, 1963, 1967, 1972, 1977
- Taça Cidade de Mossoró
  - Winners (3): 1977, 1985, 1988

== Idols ==
- Etevaldo (1960s)
- Romildo (1980s)
- Cícero Ramalho (1990s and 2000s)
- Isaías (1990s and 2000s)
- Nildo (1990s and 2000s)

== Current squad ==
=== First Team ===
Note: Flags indicate national team as defined under FIFA eligibility rules; some limited exceptions apply. Players may hold more than one non-FIFA nationality.

No.	Pos.	Nation	Player
—	GK	BRA	Érico
—	GK	BRA	Jefferson
—	DF	BRA	Pedrosa
—	DF	BRA	Nildo
—	DF	BRA	Johnson
—	DF	BRA	Robert

No.	Pos.	Nation	Player
—	DF	BRA	Rogerinho
—	MF	BRA	Everton
—	MF	BRA	Fidélis
—	MF	BRA	Wilker
—	FW	BRA	Cristiano
—	FW	BRA	Léo Guerreiro

== Stadium ==
Baraúnas' home stadium is the Nogueirão stadium, which has a maximum capacity of 25,000 people.

== Derby ==
Baraúnas' greatest rival is Potiguar de Mossoró. The derby is known as Potiba.

== Mascot ==
The club's mascot is a lion called "Leão da doze". Doze anos (Twelve years, in English) is the name of the neighborhood where the club is located.

== Anthem ==
Olismar Lima and Francisco Diógenes are the creators of the official anthem's lyrics, and Maestro Batista and Francisco Diógenes are the music authors.
