= Sport Club Santa Cruz =

Santa Cruz
- Full name: Sport Club Santa Cruz
- Nickname(s): Tricolor do Trairi
- Founded: November 30, 2003
- Ground: Iberêzão, Santa Cruz, Brazil
- Capacity: 4,500
- Head coach: Maurício Rodrigues
- League: Campeonato Brasileiro Série D
- 2011: Série D, 16th
Home colours	Away colours

Sport Club Santa Cruz, also known as Santa Cruz, are a Brazilian football team from Santa Cruz, Rio Grande do Norte. They competed in the Série C in 2008.

== History ==
Sport Club Santa Cruz were founded on November 30, 2003. They won the Campeonato Potiguar Second Level in 2004, after beating Vila Nova in the final. Santa Cruz competed in the Série C in 2008, when they were eliminated in the first stage. The club withdrew from competing in the 2009 Série D.

== Stadium ==
Santa Cruz play their home games at Iberêzão. The stadium has a maximum capacity of 4,500 people.

== Current squad (selected) ==
Note: Flags indicate national team as defined under FIFA eligibility rules; some limited exceptions apply. Players may hold more than one non-FIFA nationality.

No.	Pos.	Nation	Player
—	GK	(Brazil) BRA	Isaias
—	GK	(Brazil) BRA	Eridelson
—	DF	(Brazil) BRA	Pantera
—	DF	(Brazil) BRA	Paulinho (on loan from ABC)
—	DF	(Brazil) BRA	Adalberto
—	DF	(Brazil) BRA	Fernandes
—	DF	(Brazil) BRA	Marcelo
—	DF	(Brazil) BRA	Rafinha
—	DF	(Brazil) BRA	Rogerinho
—	DF	(Brazil) BRA	Geriel
—	DF	(Brazil) BRA	Michell

No.	Pos.	Nation	Player
—	MF	(Brazil) BRA	Lano
—	MF	(Brazil) BRA	Robson
—	MF	(Brazil) BRA	Rodrigo
—	MF	(Brazil) BRA	Daniel
—	MF	(Brazil) BRA	Gabriel
—	FW	(Brazil) BRA	Cristiano Tiririca
—	FW	(Brazil) BRA	Hendrich
—	FW	(Brazil) BRA	Alberto
—	FW	(Brazil) BRA	Didi Potiguar
—	FW	(Brazil) BRA	Wlademir

== Honours ==
- Campeonato Potiguar
  - Runners-up (1): 2011
- Campeonato Potiguar Second Division
  - Winners (1): 2004
- Copa Cidade do Natal
  - Winners (1): 2011

== Season Records ==
Season	Campeonato Potiguar					Campeonato Brasileiro			Copa do Brasil
Season	Division	Format	Stage	Position	Position	Division	Stage	Position	Copa do Brasil
2004	B	g6*-4	Final	Champions					
2005	A	2g6-8	Semifinals		4th				
2006	A	g12*-8	Quarterfinals		6th				
2007	A	g12*-8	First Stage	9th					
2008	A	(2g6*-4)²-2	Copa RN-Final	RU	5th	C	First Stage		
2008	A	(2g6*-4)²-2	Taça Natal-First Stage	4th	5th	C	First Stage		
2009	A	(g11*-2,g6*-2)-2	Final	RU	4th	D	withdrew		
2009	A	(g11*-2,g6*-2)-2	Second Stage	4th	4th				
2010	A	g(10*-2,g10*-2)-2	First Stage	7th	4th	D	withdrew		
2010	A	g(10*-2,g10*-2)-2	First Stage	3rd	4th				
2011	A	(g10*-2,g10*-2)-2	Final	CH	RU	D	in 1st stage		
2011	A	(g10*-2,g10*-2)-2	Second Stage	5th	RU	D	in 1st stage		
