= Atlético Clube Coríntians =

- Full name: Atlético Clube Corintians
- Nicknames: Corinthians; Galo do Seridó (in English: Serido's rooster)
- Founded: January 25, 1968
- Ground: Senador Dinarte Mariz, Marizão
- Capacity: 3,000
- Chairman: Rogério Gurgel da Silva
- League: Campeonato Potiguar, league champions in 2001
- 2006: Campeonato Potiguar
Home colours	Away colours

Atlético Clube Coríntians, or Coríntians, as they are usually called, is a football club based in the city Caicó in the state of Rio Grande do Norte, Brazil.

A.C. Coríntians is notable for being the only Caicó club to avoid folding or missing a season. It has maintained consistent operation since forming in 1968.

== History ==
Club crest, 1968–2001.

The club was formed in 1963 as Associação Desportiva Corintians (in English, Corinthians Sporting Association).

In 1968, Atlético Clube Coríntians (in English, Corinthians Athletic Club) was founded after Associação Desportiva Corintians and Atlético Clube de Caicó fused.

The club emerged on January 25, 1968, from the merger between Coríntians Esporte Clube and Atlético de Caicó . The most responsible for the foundation of the club was Valdemir Marcelino de Assis Coríntians competed in the Campeonato Brasileiro Série C, but was eliminated in the first stage.

The club won the Campeonato Potiguar league title in 2001. In the same year, Coríntians competed in the Campeonato Brasileiro Série C, but was eliminated in the first stage, finishing in the third place of its group.

In 2002 and in 2003, the club competed in the Copa do Brasil. In 2002, the club was eliminated in the first stage by Bahia, and in 2003, Coríntians defeated Santa Cruz in the first stage, but was eliminated by Cruzeiro in the second stage.

== Mascot ==
The team's mascot is a rooster.

== Honours ==
- Campeonato Potiguar
  - Winners (1): 2001
  - Runners-up (1): 2010
- Copa Cidade do Natal
  - Winners (1): 2010
