= Alecrim Futebol Clube =

Alecrim
- Full name: Alecrim Futebol Clube
- Nicknames: Verdão; Verdão Maravilha; Periquito; Time mais simpático do RN
- Founded: August 15, 1915 (111 years ago)
- Ground: Machadão, Natal, Brazil
- Capacity: 45,000
- President: Anthony Armstrong Emery
- Head coach: Edson Alves
- League: Campeonato Potiguar Second Division
- 2021: 7th of 8
| Home colors | Away colors |

Alecrim Futebol Clube, also known as Alecrim (pt-BR pronunciation), are a Brazilian football team from Natal, Rio Grande do Norte. They competed in the Série A in 1963, 1964 and 1986.

== History ==
Alecrim Futebol Clube were founded on August 15, 1915, by a group of boys that included the future Brazilian President, Café Filho. They won the Campeonato Potiguar seven times. Alecrim competed in the Série A in 1986 when they were eliminated in the first stage of the competition.

On February 4, 1968, the famous player Garrincha played a game for Alecrim against Sport. In 2012, Alecrim appointed Englishman Anthony Armstrong-Emery, as the first foreign President of a Brazilian club.

== Stadium ==
Alecrim played their home games at Estádio Dr. João Cláudio Vasconcelos Machado, commonly known as Machadão. The stadium had a maximum capacity of 45,000 people. At the end of 2013, Alecrim moved to a new 10,500 capacity stadium, which has the potential for expansion to 25,000. The new stadium will also host an academy.

== Players with current contract ==
Note: Flags indicate national team as defined under FIFA eligibility rules; some limited exceptions apply. Players may hold more than one non-FIFA nationality.

| No. | Pos. | Nation | Player |
|---|---|---|---|
| — | GK | BRA | Ubiratan Aurélio Ferreira Junior |
| — | GK | BRA | Willians Gomes do Nascimento |
| — | DF | BRA | Francisco Fabiano Pereira Marciano |
| — | DF | BRA | Diego Batista Cordeiro de Almeida |
| — | DF | BRA | Ewerton Silva Felix |
| — | DF | BRA | Elton Gomes Avelino de Lima |
| — | DF | BRA | Antonio Carlos de Oliveira Mendanha |
| — | DF | BRA | Eduardo Igor da Silva Moreno |
| — | DF | BRA | Jonatha Marques de Oliveira<--Jonatha--> |
| — | DF | BRA | Abemor do Nascimento |
| — | DF | BRA | Cleiton Kelly da Silva |
| — | DF | BRA | Francisco Anderson da Silva Nascimento |
| — | MF | BRA | Roosevelt Delano de Menezes Alves |
| — | MF | BRA | Danilo Gomes de Almeida |

| No. | Pos. | Nation | Player |
|---|---|---|---|
| — | MF | BRA | Claiton Fontoura dos Santos |
| — | MF | BRA | Thiago Teodoro |
| — | MF | BRA | José Alexandre da Silva Sousa |
| — | MF | BRA | Marcelo Mozack |
| — | MF | BRA | Paulo César de Oliveira |
| — | MF | BRA | Francisco Manoel do Nascimento Silva |
| — | MF | BRA | Ramon Gabriel Santos do Nascimento |
| — | MF | BRA | Paulo César de Oliveira |
| — | FW | BRA | Edivaldo Felix Alves Barbosa |
| — | FW | BRA | Edivan Luiz Hermenegildo |
| — | FW | BRA | Rogean Gomes da Silva |
| — | FW | BRA | Rico |
| — | FW | BRA | José Maria dos Santos Lima |
| — | FW | BRA | Roberlan Lacerda |

== Honours ==
=== Official tournaments ===
State
| Competitions | Titles | Seasons |
|---|---|---|
| Campeonato Potiguar | 5 | 1963, 1964, 1968, 1985, 1986 |
| Campeonato Potiguar Second Division | 1 | 2022 |

=== Others tournaments ===
==== State ====
- Torneio Início do Rio Grande do Norte (4): 1926, 1961, 1966, 1972

=== Runners-up ===
- Campeonato Potiguar (5): 1960, 1965, 1966, 1972, 1982
- Campeonato Potiguar Second Division (4): 2018, 2019, 2020, 2024
