= Campeonato Potiguar =

Football league in Rio Grande do Norte, Brazil

- Organising body: FNF
- Founded: 1918; 108 years ago
- Country: Brazil
- State: Rio Grande do Norte
- Level on pyramid: 1
- Relegation to: Campeonato Potiguar Second Division
- Domestic cup(s): Copa do Brasil; Copa do Nordeste
- Current champions: América (40th title) (2026)
- Most championships: ABC (57 titles)
- Website: FNF Official website

The Campeonato Potiguar is the top-flight professional state football league in the Brazilian state of Rio Grande do Norte. It is run by the Rio Grande do Norte Football Federation (FNF).

== List of champions ==
Following is the list with the Campeonato Potiguar champions:

Season	Champions	Runners-up
1918	Not finished	
1919	América (1)	Centro Esportivo
1920	América (2)	Centro Esportivo
1920	ABC (1)	Centro Esportivo
1921	ABC (2)	América
1921	Centro Esportivo (1)	América
1922	América (3)	ABC
1923	ABC (3)	América
1924	Alecrim (1)	Tie for champion
1924	América (4)	Tie for champion
1925	ABC (4)	Tie for champion
1925	Alecrim (2)	Tie for champion
1926	América (5)	Tie for champion
1926	ABC (5)	Tie for champion
1927	América (6)	ABC
1928	ABC (6)	América
1929	ABC (7)	América
1930	América (7)	ABC
1931	América (8)	ABC
1932	ABC (8)	Sport
1933	ABC (9)	América
1934	ABC (10)	América
1935	ABC (11)	América
1936	ABC (12)	Sport
1937	ABC (13)	América
1938	ABC (14)	América
1939	ABC (15)	América
1940	ABC (16)	América
1941	ABC (17)	Santa Cruz
1942	Not finished	
1943	Santa Cruz (1)	América
1944	ABC (18)	América
1945	ABC (19)	América
1946	América (9)	ABC
1947	ABC (20)	Santa Cruz
1948	América (10)	ABC
1949	América (11)	ABC
1950	ABC (21)	Santa Cruz
1951	América (12)	ABC
1952	América (13)	Santa Cruz
1953	ABC (22)	América
1954	ABC (23)	América
1955	ABC (24)	América
1956	América (14)	ABC
1957	América (15)	ABC
1958	ABC (25)	América
1959	ABC (26)	América
1960	ABC (27)	Alecrim
1961	ABC (28)	Atlético
1962	ABC (29)	Globo EC
1963	Alecrim (3)	ABC
1964	Alecrim (4)	ABC
1965	ABC (30)	Alecrim
1966	ABC (31)	Alecrim
1967	América (16)	Riachuelo
1968	Alecrim (5)	ABC
1969	América (17)	ABC
1970	ABC (32)	América
1971	ABC (33)	América
1972	ABC (34)	Alecrim
1973	ABC (35)	América
1974	América (18)	ABC
1975	América (19)	ABC
1976	ABC (36)	América
1977	América (20)	ABC
1978	ABC (37)	América
1979	América (21)	ABC
1980	América (22)	ABC
1981	América (23)	Baraúnas
1982	América (24)	Alecrim
1983	ABC (38)	América
1984	ABC (39)	América
1985	Alecrim (6)	América
1986	Alecrim (7)	ABC
1987	América (25)	Baraúnas
1988	América (26)	ABC
1989	América (27)	ABC
1990	ABC (40)	América
1991	América (28)	ABC
1992	América (29)	ABC
1993	ABC (41)	América
1994	ABC (42)	América
1995	ABC (43)	Desportiva
1996	América (30)	ABC
1997	ABC (44)	Potiguar de Mossoró
1998	ABC (45)	América
1999	ABC (46)	América
2000	ABC (47)	São Gonçalo
2001	Corintians (1)	América
2002	América (31)	Corintians
2003	América (32)	São Gonçalo
2004	Potiguar de Mossoró (1)	América
2005	ABC (48)	América
2006	Baraúnas (1)	Potiguar de Mossoró
2007	ABC (49)	América
2008	ABC (50)	Potiguar de Mossoró
2009	ASSU (1)	Potyguar Seridoense
2010	ABC (51)	Corintians
2011	ABC (52)	Santa Cruz (SC)
2012	América (33)	ABC
2013	Potiguar de Mossoró (2)	América
2014	América (34)	Globo
2015	América (35)	ABC
2016	ABC (53)	América
2017	ABC (54)	Globo
2018	ABC (55)	América
2019	América (36)	ABC
2020	ABC (56)	América
2021	Globo (1)	ABC
2022	ABC (57)	América
2023	América (37)	ABC
2024	América (38)	Santa Cruz
2025	América (39)	ABC
2026	América (40)	ABC

== Titles by team ==
Teams in bold stills active.

Rank	Club	Winners	Winning years
1	**ABC**	57	1920, 1921 (shared), 1923, 1925 (shared), 1926 (shared), 1928, 1929, 1932, 1933, 1934, 1935, 1936, 1937, 1938, 1939, 1940, 1941, 1944, 1945, 1947, 1950, 1953, 1954, 1955, 1958, 1959, 1960, 1961, 1962, 1965, 1966, 1970, 1971, 1972, 1973, 1976, 1978, 1983, 1984, 1990, 1993, 1994, 1995, 1997, 1998, 1999, 2000, 2005, 2007, 2008, 2010, 2011, 2016, 2017, 2018, 2020, 2022
2	**América**	40	1919, 1920, 1922, 1924 (shared), 1926 (shared), 1927, 1930, 1931, 1946, 1948, 1949, 1951, 1952, 1956, 1957, 1967, 1969, 1974, 1975, 1977, 1979, 1980, 1981, 1982, 1987, 1988, 1989, 1991, 1992, 1996, 2002, 2003, 2012, 2014, 2015, 2019, 2023, 2024, 2025, 2026
3	**Alecrim**	7	1924 (shared), 1925 (shared), 1963, 1964, 1968, 1985, 1986
4	**Potiguar de Mossoró**	2	2004, 2013
4	**ASSU**	1	2009
4	**Baraúnas**	1	2006
4	Centro Esportivo	1	1921 (shared)
4	Coríntians	1	2001
4	**Globo**	1	2021
4	**Santa Cruz**	1	1943

=== By city ===
City	Championships	Clubs
Natal	106	ABC (57), América (40), Alecrim (7), Centro Esportivo (1), Santa Cruz (1)
Mossoró	3	Potiguar de Mossoró (2), Baraúnas (1)
Assu	1	ASSU (1)
Caicó	1	Coríntians (1)
Ceará-Mirim	1	Globo (1)

== Participation ==
=== Most appearances ===
As of 2023 season

Below is the list of clubs that have more appearances in the Campeonato Potiguar.

Club	App	First	Last
ABC	104	1919	2023
América	99	1919	2023
Alecrim	85	1924	2023
Atlético Potiguar	48	1941	1993
Potiguar de Mossoró	45	1974	2023
Riachuelo	41	1949	1993
Baraúnas	38	1976	2018
Santa Cruz	38	1928	2023
Força e Luz	24	1932	2023
Potyguar Seridoense	22	1976	2023

== See also ==
- Copa Cidade do Natal
- Copa RN
- Copa Rio Grande do Norte
