= Associação Cultural e Desportiva Potiguar =

Potiguar
- Full name: Associação Cultural e Desportiva Potiguar
- Nicknames: Time Macho; Príncipe; Alvirrubro Mossoroense; Maior do interior
- Founded: 15 February 1948; 78 years ago
- Ground: Nogueirão
- Capacity: 25,000
- Chairman: Benjamim Machado
- Manager: Emanoel Sacramento
- League: Campeonato Potiguar
- 2025: Potiguar, 5th of 8
- Website: http://www.potiguardemossoro.com.br/
Home colors	Away colors	Third colors

Associação Cultural e Desportiva Potiguar, commonly known as Potiguar or as Potiguar de Mossoró, are a Brazilian football team from Mossoró. They won the Campeonato Potiguar once and competed in the Série A twice.

Potiguar is currently ranked fourth among Rio Grande do Norte teams in CBF's national club ranking at 157th place overall. They are the best placed team in the state from outside of Greater Natal.

== History ==
They were founded on 11 February 1945, as Esporte Clube Potuguar by a group of sportsmen. They fused with Associação Desportiva Potiguar on June 19, 1953. The club won the Campeonato Potiguar in 2004. Potiguar competed in the Série A in 1979, when they were eliminated in the first stage. The club was eliminated in Copa João Havelange's first stage of the Green module in 2000.

== Stadium ==
They play their home games at the Nogueirão stadium. The stadium has a maximum capacity of 25,000 people.

== Honours ==
=== State ===
- Campeonato Potiguar
  - Winners (2): 2004, 2013
  - Runners-up (3): 1997, 2006, 2008
- Campeonato Potiguar Second Division
  - Winners (1): 1981
- Copa Cidade do Natal
  - Winners (2): 2008, 2013
- Torneio Início do Rio Grande do Norte
  - Winners (1): 1979

=== City ===
- Campeonato Mossoroense
  - Winners (20): 1951, 1952, 1953, 1954, 1955, 1957,1965, 1966, 1968, 1969, 1971, 1973, 1974, 1975, 1976, 1980, 1981, 1985, 1986, 1987

== Derby ==
The derby between Potiguar and Baraúnas is known as Potiba.
