= 2018 Campeonato Paraibano =

Campeonato Paraibano de Futebol
- Season: 2018
- Champions: Botafogo-PB
- Relegated: Guarabira; Auto Esporte
- Copa do Brasil: Botafogo-PB; Campinense
- Série D: Campinense; Serrano
- Copa do Nordeste: Botafogo-PB; Campinense
- Matches: 72
- Goals: 157 (2.18 per match)
- Top goalscorer: 9 goals (Nando, Botafogo-PB)
- Biggest home win: Nacional de Patos 6–0 Guarabira; Relegation Quadrangle Round 6, 25 March
- Biggest away win: Guarabira 1–4 Botafogo-PB; Round 4, 24 January; Guarabira 0–3 Atlético Cajazeirense; Relegation Quadrangle Round 5, 21 March
- Highest scoring: 6 goals Botafogo-PB 3–3 CSP; Round 7, 11 February; Treze 2–4 Botafogo-PB; Round 8, 18 February; Nacional de Patos 6–0 Guarabira; Relegation Quadrangle Round 6, 25 March
- Longest winning run: 5 (Sousa)
- Longest unbeaten run: 10 (Botafogo-PB)
- Longest winless run: 13 (Auto Esporte)
- Longest losing run: 6 (Auto Esporte)
- All statistics correct as of 10:19, 9 April 2018 (UTC).

The 2018 Campeonato Paraibano de Futebol was the 108th edition of Paraíba's top professional football league. The competition began on 7 January and ended on 8 April. Botafogo-PB were defending champions, after defeating Treze in the 2017 final.

== Format ==
The competition was divided into a number of stages.

In the first stage, the ten teams were divided into two groups of five. Each team played against the five teams in the other group, both at home and away, totaling ten games. The teams finishing at the top of each group qualified directly for the third stage, which is the semi-final stage. The teams finishing second and third in each group advanced to the second stage, which is the quarter-final stage. Among these two teams, the one with the best record in the competition was classified first to progress to the next stage. The teams finishing fourth and fifth in each group competed in the relegation quadrangle stage.

In the second stage, which is the quarter-final stage, the teams that finished second in each group competed against the team that finished third in the same group over two legs, one at home and one away. In both ties, the team that finished third in their group played the first leg at home. The two winning teams advanced to the third stage, which is the semi-final stage. The team with the best record in the competition up to that point was classified as third going into that stage.

In the relegation quadrangle stage, the four qualifying teams played each other both at home and away, with no points carried forward from the first stage. The two teams that finished at the bottom of this stage were relegated to Division 2 for 2019.

In the third stage, which is the semi-final stage, the team classified fourth played against the team classified first, and the team classified third played against the team classified second. Both ties were played over two legs, with the lower qualified team playing the first leg at home.

In the final stage, the two winning teams from the third (semi-final) stage played over two legs, with the team with the best record in the competition so far playing the first leg away from home.

=== Qualification ===
The two finalists qualified to participate in the 2019 Copa do Brasil and 2019 Copa do Nordeste. The two best placed teams (other than Botafogo-PB) qualified to participate in the 2019 Campeonato Brasileiro Série D.

== Participating teams ==
Club	Home city	2017 result
Atlético Cajazeirense	Cajazeiras	4th
Auto Esporte	João Pessoa	5th
Botafogo-PB	João Pessoa	1st
Campinense	Campina Grande	3rd
CSP	João Pessoa	8th
Guarabira	Guarabira	2nd (2nd division)
Serrano	Campina Grande	6th
Nacional de Patos	Patos	1st (2nd division)
Sousa	Sousa	7th
Treze	Campina Grande	2nd

== First stage ==
=== Group A ===
Pos	Team	Pld	W	D	L	GF	GA	GD	Pts	Qualification
1	Campinense	10	7	2	1	17	3	+14	23	Qualification for Semi-final stage
2	Botafogo-PB	10	6	4	0	27	11	+16	22	Qualification for Quarter-final stage
3	Sousa	10	6	2	2	12	6	+6	20	Qualification for Quarter-final stage
4	Nacional de Patos	10	6	1	3	9	6	+3	19	Qualification for Relegation quadrangle
5	Auto Esporte	10	0	3	7	8	15	−7	3	Qualification for Relegation quadrangle

Rules for classification: 1) points; 2) wins; 3) goal difference; 4) number of goals scored; 5) least red cards; 6) least yellow cards.

=== Group B ===
Pos	Team	Pld	W	D	L	GF	GA	GD	Pts	Qualification
1	Treze	10	4	2	4	10	12	−2	14	Qualification for Semi-final stage
2	CSP	10	3	4	3	11	12	−1	13	Qualification for Quarter-final stage
3	Serrano	10	3	2	5	7	13	−6	11	Qualification for Quarter-final stage
4	Atlético Cajazeirense	10	2	2	6	9	16	−7	8	Qualification for Relegation quadrangle
5	Guarabira	10	1	2	7	4	20	−16	5	Qualification for Relegation quadrangle

Rules for classification: 1) points; 2) wins; 3) goal difference; 4) number of goals scored; 5) least red cards; 6) least yellow cards.

== Quarter-final stage ==
Games were played between 7 and 15 March.

Team 1	Agg.	Team 2	1st leg	2nd leg
Sousa	2–3	Botafogo-PB	1–0	1–3
Serrano	2–0	CSP	1–0	1–0

== Semi-final stage ==
Games were scheduled to be played on 18 March and 25 March. The first leg between Botafogo-PB and Treze was postponed due to a legal challenge by Botafogo-PB regarding who should have home advantage according to the published rules of the competition. Following rejection of the challenge, the game was rescheduled for 25 March, with the second leg on 1 April.

Team 1	Agg.	Team 2	1st leg	2nd leg
Serrano	1–2	Campinense	1–0	0–2
Botafogo-PB	3–1	Treze	2–1	1–0

== Final stage ==
Games were played on 5 and 8 April.

Team 1	Agg.	Team 2	1st leg	2nd leg
Campinense	1–2	Botafogo-PB	1–0	0–2

== Relegation quadrangle ==
Games took place between 7 and 25 March.

Pos	Team	Pld	W	D	L	GF	GA	GD	Pts	Qualification
1	Nacional de Patos	6	3	2	1	10	4	+6	11	
2	Atlético Cajazeirense	6	3	1	2	8	4	+4	10	
3	Auto Esporte (R)	6	2	2	2	5	4	+1	8	Relegated to Second Division
4	Guarabira (R)	6	1	1	4	3	14	−11	4	Relegated to Second Division

Rules for classification: 1) points; 2) wins; 3) goal difference; 4) number of goals scored; 5) least red cards; 6) least yellow cards.
(R) Relegated
