= 2016 Campeonato Paraibano =

Campeonato Paraibano de Futebol
- Season: 2016
- Champions: Campinense
- Relegated: Esporte; Santa Cruz-PB
- Copa do Brasil: Campinense; Botafogo-PB
- Série D: Campinense; Sousa
- Copa do Nordeste: Campinense; Botafogo-PB
- Matches played: 70
- Goals scored: 161 (2.3 per match)
- Top goalscorer: 9 goals (Rodrigão, Campinense)
- Biggest home win: Campinense 7–1 Esporte, Round 7, 6 March 2016
- Biggest away win: Atlético Cajazeirense 0-4 Campinense, Round 3, 6 February 2016
- Highest scoring: 8 goals (Campinense 7–1 Esporte), Round 7, 6 March 2016
- Longest winning run: 3 (Campinense)
- Longest unbeaten run: 15 (Campinense)
- Longest winless run: 8 (Atlético Cajazeirense)
- Longest losing run: 7 (Esporte)

The 2016 Campeonato Paraibano de Futebol was the 106th edition of Paraíba's top professional football league. The competition began on 30 January and ended on 15 June. Campinense were champions, for the 20th time.

== Format ==
The competition was divided into three stages.

In the first stage, the ten teams were split into two groups. Each team played all the teams from the other group, home and away, for a total of ten games.

In the second stage, the top three teams from each group played off in a single round over two legs. The draw was pre–determined based on finishing positions in the first stage. The bottom two teams from each group played each other home and away, for a total of six games, with the bottom two teams in this phase relegated to the second division.

In the final stage, the three winning teams in the second stage, along with the eliminated team with the best overall record in the competition, played the Semi Final over two legs, and the winners played the final over two legs.

=== Qualification ===
The champions qualify to participate in the 2017 Copa do Brasil. The two best placed teams (other than Botafogo-PB) qualify to participate in the 2016 Campeonato Brasileiro Série D and 2017 Campeonato Brasileiro Série D. The two finalists qualify to participate in the 2017 Copa do Nordeste.

== Participating teams ==
Club	Home city	2015 result
Atlético Cajazeirense	Cajazeiras	7th
Auto Esporte	João Pessoa	4th
Botafogo-PB	João Pessoa	2nd
Campinense	Campina Grande	1st
CSP	João Pessoa	5th
Esporte	Patos	2nd (2nd division)
Paraíba	Cajazeiras	1st (2nd division)
Santa Cruz-PB	Santa Rita	8th
Sousa	Sousa	6th
Treze	Campina Grande	3rd

== First stage ==
=== Standings ===
==== Group A ====
Pos	Team	Pld	W	D	L	GF	GA	GD	Pts	Qualification
1	Campinense	10	6	4	0	20	3	+17	22	Qualification for Second stage
2	Paraíba	10	4	3	3	13	11	+2	15	Qualification for Second stage
3	Sousa	10	3	5	2	12	9	+3	14	Qualification for Second stage
4	Auto Esporte	10	3	3	4	10	19	−9	12	Entered into Relegation stage
5	Santa Cruz-PB	10	2	2	6	6	12	−6	8	Entered into Relegation stage

Rules for classification: 1) points; 2) wins; 3) goal difference; 4) number of goals scored; 5) least red cards; 6) least yellow cards; 7) Seeding by FPF

==== Group B ====
Pos	Team	Pld	W	D	L	GF	GA	GD	Pts	Qualification
1	Botafogo-PB	10	6	4	0	19	3	+16	22	Qualification for Second stage
2	CSP	10	3	4	3	11	9	+2	13	Qualification for Second stage
3	Treze	10	3	4	3	11	11	0	13	Qualification for Second stage
4	Esporte	10	2	3	5	10	24	−14	9	Entered into Relegation stage
5	Atlético Cajazeirense	10	1	2	7	3	14	−11	5	Entered into Relegation stage

Rules for classification: 1) points; 2) wins; 3) goal difference; 4) number of goals scored; 5) least red cards; 6) least yellow cards; 7) Seeding by FPF

== Second stage ==
The top three teams from each group in the first stage play each other over two legs. In each tie, the better performing team will have home advantage in the second leg.

The first legs will be played on 10 April 2016, the second legs on 24 April 2016.

Team 1	Agg.	Team 2	1st leg	2nd leg	Match ID
Treze	1–2	Campinense	0–0	1–2	C
CSP	2–0	Paraíba	2–0	0–0	D
Sousa	3–6	Botafogo-PB	3–1	0–5	E

== Relegation stage ==
The bottom two teams from each group in the first stage play in league tournament, home and away, with the two worst performing teams being relegated to the Second Division.

Pos	Team	Pld	W	D	L	GF	GA	GD	Pts	Qualification
1	Auto Esporte	6	4	1	1	8	3	+5	13	
2	Atlético Cajazeirense	6	4	0	2	6	5	+1	12	
3	Santa Cruz-PB (R)	6	3	1	2	7	5	+2	10	Relegated to Second Division
4	Esporte (R)	6	0	0	6	1	9	−8	0	Relegated to Second Division

Rules for classification: 1) points; 2) wins; 3) goal difference; 4) number of goals scored; 5) least red cards; 6) least yellow cards; 7) Seeding by FPF
(R) Relegated

== Final stage ==
In each tie, the team which has the best record so far in the competition has home advantage in the second leg. Sousa qualified as the "lucky loser" for being losing team in the second stage with the best overall record in the competition.

Semi Final first leg games were scheduled to take place on 1 May and 8 May 2016, with Second leg games scheduled to take place on 8 and 11 May 2016. However, an injunction filed by Treze at the Superior Tribunal de Justiça Desportiva (STJD) the Superior Court of Sports Justice, caused the first leg of the game between Campinense and CSP to be postponed until after a hearing at the Tribunal de Justiça Desportiva da Paraíba (TJD-PB) (Sports Court of Paraíba) on 11 May.

=== Bracket ===
Semi Final
CSP	0	1	1
Campinense	1	1	2
Sousa	2	0	2
Botafogo-PB	1	2	3

Final
Campinense	3	0	3
Botafogo-PB	2	1	3
