= 2019 Campeonato Paraibano =

109th season of Paraíba, Brazil's professional football league

Campeonato Paraibano de Futebol
- Season: 2019
- Champions: Botafogo-PB
- Relegated: Serrano; Esporte de Patos
- Copa do Brasil: Botafogo-PB; Campinense
- Série D: Campinense; Atlético Cajazeirense
- Copa do Nordeste: Botafogo-PB; Campinense
- Matches: 56
- Goals: 135 (2.41 per match)
- Top goalscorer: 7 (Clayton, Botafogo-PB)
- Biggest home win: Campinense 4–0 Serrano (Match day 8, 10 March 2019)
- Biggest away win: Serrano 0–3 Atlético Cajazeirense (Match day 1, 12 January 2019); Serrano 0–3 Campinense (Match day 3, 27 January 2019); Serrano 1–4 CSP (Match day 7, 23 February 2019); Nacional de Patos 1–4 Atlético Cajazeirense (Match day 9, 17 March 2019)
- Highest scoring: Perilima 3–3 Serrano (Match day 10, 27 March 2019)
- Longest winning run: 6 (Botafogo-PB)
- Longest unbeaten run: 7 (Sousa)
- Longest winless run: 7 (Serrano)
- Longest losing run: 5 (CSP)
- All statistics correct as of 08:52, 22 April 2019 (UTC).

The 2019 Campeonato Paraibano de Futebol was the 109th edition of Paraíba's top professional football league. The competition began on 12 January and ended on 20 April. Botafogo-PB were defending champions, after defeating Campinense in the 2018 final.

Botafogo-PB were crowned champions, after a repeat of the 2018 final against Campinense.

== Format ==
The competition was divided into a number of stages.

In the first (group) stage, the ten teams were divided into two groups of five. Each team played the five teams in the other group, home and away, for a total of ten games. The teams that finished first and second in each group qualified directly for the second (semi-final) stage. The teams that finished last in each group were relegated to the second division.

In the second (semi-final) stage, the winner of each group played the runner up of their group over two games, home and away. The group winner had home advantage in the second leg.

In the third (final) stage, the two winning teams from the second (semi-final) stage played over two legs, with the team with the best record in the competition so far playing the second leg at home.

=== Qualification ===
The two finalists qualified to participate in the 2020 Copa do Brasil and 2020 Copa do Nordeste. The two best placed teams (other than those already participating in a national league) qualified to participate in the 2020 Campeonato Brasileiro Série D.

== Participating teams ==
Club	Home city	2018 result
Atlético Cajazeirense	Cajazeiras	8th
Botafogo-PB	João Pessoa	1st
Campinense	Campina Grande	2nd
CSP	João Pessoa	6th
Esporte de Patos	Patos	1st (2nd Division)
Serrano	Campina Grande	3rd
Nacional de Patos	Patos	7th
Perilima	Campina Grande	2nd (2nd Division)
Sousa	Sousa	5th
Treze	Campina Grande	4th

== First stage ==
=== Group A ===
Pos	Team	Pld	W	D	L	GF	GA	GD	Pts	Qualification
1	Botafogo-PB (A)	10	8	0	2	17	5	+12	24	Advance to Semi-final stage
2	Nacional de Patos (A)	10	5	0	5	16	18	−2	15	Advance to Semi-final stage
3	Sousa	10	3	5	2	11	8	+3	14	
4	Treze	10	3	2	5	8	8	0	11	
5	Serrano (R)	10	1	4	5	9	23	−14	7	Relegated to Division 2

Rules for classification: 1) points; 2) wins; 3) goal difference; 4) number of goals scored; 5) least red cards; 6) least yellow cards.
(A) Advance to a further round; (R) Relegated

=== Group B ===
Pos	Team	Pld	W	D	L	GF	GA	GD	Pts	Qualification
1	Atlético Cajazeirense (A)	10	7	1	2	17	6	+11	22	Advance to Semi-final stage
2	Campinense (A)	10	5	2	3	15	7	+8	17	Advance to Semi-final stage
3	Perilima	10	2	5	3	11	15	−4	11	
4	CSP	10	2	2	6	10	16	−6	8	
5	Esporte de Patos (Note: Esporte de Patos deducted three points, subject to appeal, by the Superior Court of Justice for Sport (STJD) due to fielding a suspended player in the final round game against Nacional de Patos on 27 March 2019.) (R)	10	3	1	6	9	17	−8	7	Relegated to Division 2

Rules for classification: 1) points; 2) wins; 3) goal difference; 4) number of goals scored; 5) least red cards; 6) least yellow cards.
(A) Advance to a further round; (R) Relegated

== Semi-finals ==
In the semi-final stage, the winner of each group played the runner up of their group over two games, home and away. The group winner had home advantage in the second leg.

Semi-finals were played between 31 March and 14 April 2019.

Team 1	Agg.	Team 2	1st leg	2nd leg
Nacional de Patos	1–3	Botafogo-PB	1–2	0–1
Campinense	2–2(5–3 p)	Atlético Cajazeirense	1–1	1–1

== Final ==
The final took place over two games, home and away, and the team with the best record in the competition had home advantage in the second leg.

The final took place on 17 and 20 April 2019.

Team 1	Agg.	Team 2	1st leg	2nd leg
Campinense	1–4	Botafogo-PB	1–2	0-2
