= Eduardo Rato =

Brazilian footballer

Personal information
- Full name: Eduardo Vieira do Nascimento
- Date of birth: January 11, 1983 (age 43)
- Place of birth: Foz do Iguaçu, Paraná, Brazil
- Height: 1.87 m (6 ft 2 in)
- Position: Forward

Senior career*
Years	Team	Apps	(Gls)
2002–2003	Iraty		
2003–2004	Porto B		
2004–2005	Olhanense		
2006	Londrina		
2006	Daejeon Citizen		
2007	Joinville		
2007	J. Malucelli		
2008	Caxias		
2009	Nacional de Patos		
2009	Umuarama-PR		
2010	Campinense		
2010	Operário Ferroviário		
2011	Nacional de Patos		
2011	Ypiranga-AP		
2012	Sousa		
2012	Campinense		
2013	Itabaiana		
2013	Tiradentes-CE		
2013	Sousa		
2013	Potiguar de Mossoró		
2013	Esporte de Patos		
2014	Chã Grande		
2014	Coruripe		
2014	Cametá		
2014	Miramar		
2015	Santa Cruz (SC)		
2015	Hercílio Luz		
2015	Globo		
2015	Esporte de Patos		
2016	CSE		
2016	Esporte de Patos		
2016	América-GO		
2017	Atlético Cajazeirense		
2017	Estanciano		
2017	Genus		
2017	Nacional de Patos		
- * Club domestic league appearances and goals as of 18 September 2025

Eduardo Vieira do Nascimento also known as Edu or Eduardo Rato (born January 11, 1983) is a Brazilian former footballer who played as a forward.

== Career ==
A native of Foz do Iguaçu, Edu Rato began his career with Iraty in 2002, being part of the team that won the state championship that year. He later played abroad for Porto B and Daejeon Citizen, as well as other traditional Brazilian teams such as Londrina, Joinville, and Caxias. In the latter part of his career, he traveled throughout the country, standing out especially in Paraíba, where he forged ties. He retired in 2017.

== Honours ==
Iraty

- Campeonato Paranaense: 2002

Joinville

- Campeonato Catarinense Série B: 2007

Esporte de Patos

- Campeonato Paraibano Second Division: 2013, 2015

Nacional de Patos

- Campeonato Paraibano Second Division: 2017
