= Miss Paraíba =

Miss Paraíba Miss Universe Paraíba
- Formation: 1955
- Type: Beauty pageant
- Headquarters: Paraíba, Brazil
- Members: Miss Brazil
- Official language: Portuguese
- State Director: Beto Ferraz

Miss Paraíba is a Brazilian Beauty pageant which selects the representative for the State of Paraíba at the Miss Brazil contest. The pageant was created in 1955 and has been held every year since with the exception of 1990–1991, 1993, and 2020. The pageant is held annually with representation of several municipalities. Since 2019, the State director for Miss Paraíba is Beto Ferraz. Paraíba still has yet to win a crown in the national contest.

== Results summary ==
=== Placements ===
- Miss Brazil:
- 1st Runner-Up:
- 2nd Runner-Up:
- 3rd Runner-Up: Virgínia Helena Gomes da Silva (1981)
- 4th Runner-Up: Roberta Moreira da Silva (1986); Amélia Augusta da Cruz Fonsêca (1989); Natália Taveira Mota Alves (2010)
- Top 5/Top 8/Top 9:
- Top 10/Top 11/Top 12: Patrícia Moreira da Silva (1985); Cláudia Maria Pessoa Jardim (1987); Madeleine de Vasconcelos Braga (1988); Fabiana Pirro Tavares de Lima (1992); Humberlena de Albuquerque Chacon (1994); Carolina Thaís Muller (1997); Ariádine Maroja Bezerra de Albuquerque (2015)
- Top 15/Top 16: Flora Alexandre Meira Costa (2009); Ana Carla Medeiros (2018); Kennya Araújo da Silva (2019); Joyce Sthephanny Freitas (2022)

=== Special awards ===
- Miss BrasilTur by Danilo Avila

3rd Runner-Up: Vanessa de Souza/ Vanessa Abreu (2001)

- Miss Congeniality: Maria do Socorro Costa Alves (1969); Geusa Maria Moreira de Azevedo (1982); Maria do Socorro Braga de Lira (1984); Patrícia Moreira da Silva (1985); Janalívia do Nascimento Carneiro (1995); Kayonara Walleska de Macêdo (2008)
- Best State Costume: Cleide Lira Pedrosa (1965)

== Titleholders ==
Year	Name	Age (Note: Ages at the time of the pageant)	Height	Represented	Miss Brazil placement	Notes
Miss Universe Paraíba
2023	Ana Vitória Jacinto Araújo	24	1.79 m (5 ft 10 1/2 in)	Pocinhos		
2022	Joyce Sthephanny Freitas	20	1.70 m (5 ft 7 in)	Solânea	Top 16	
2021	Maria Beatriz Monteiro Gomes	22	1.75 m (5 ft 9 in)	Patos		
U Miss Paraíba 2020 and Miss Paraíba Be Emotion 2020
2020	No national Miss Brazil contest due to the COVID-19 pandemic and change in the national franchise holder which caused the national titleholder to be appointed.					
Miss Paraíba Be Emotion
2019	Kennya Araújo da Silva	26	1.71 m (5 ft 7 1/2 in)	João Pessoa	Top 15	Last Miss Miss Paraíba Be Emotion
2018	Ana Carla Medeiros	21	1.72 m (5 ft 7 1/2 in)	Campina Grande	Top 15	
2017	Larissa Aragão Holanda	22	1.68 m (5 ft 6 in)	Bananeiras		
2016	Mayrla Emília Dantas Vasconcelos	20	1.85 m (6 ft 1 in)	Nova Palmeira		
2015	Ariádine Maroja Bezerra de Albuquerque	20	1.78 m (5 ft 10 in)	Mamanguape	Top 10	
Miss Paraíba Universe
2014	Larissa Juliane Muniz da Silva	18	1.75 m (5 ft 9 in)	Esperança		
2014	Maria Janaynna Sousa de Oliveira	19	1.73 m (5 ft 8 in)	Mamanguape	Did not compete	Resigned the title after winning prior to Miss Brazil.
2013	Patrícia Curvelo dos Anjos	24	1.78 m (5 ft 10 in)	Sousa		
2012	Natália Cristina Oliveira	21	1.76 m (5 ft 9 1/2 in)	Areia		
Miss Paraíba
2011	Priscilla Medeiros Durand			Conde		
2010	Natália Taveira Mota Alves	22		João Pessoa	4th Runner-Up	
2009	Flora Alexandre Meira Costa	23		Campina Grande	Top 15	
2008	Kayonara Walleska de Macêdo	21	1.73 m (5 ft 8 in)	Araruna		Won Miss Congeniality.
2007	Roberta Guerra de Brito			Centro Universitário de João Pessoa		
2006	Sarah Azevedo Rodrigues					
2005	Lílian Vasconcelos de Moura					
2004	Isabela Marinho da Nóbrega					
2003	Mayana Maria Ramos Neiva			Campina Grande		
2002	Vanessa de Abreu Cordeiro -(Vanessa de Souza)	20	1.70	Jacaraú	3th Runner Miss BrasilTur	Aclamada Miss Paraíba 2002 pelo missologo Hermany Cruz . In memoria"
2001	Andréia Aravanos Sarinho					
2000	Jorgelane Talma Caires					
1999	Juliana Pereira Luna					
1998	Íris Bianca Medrado					
1997	Carolina Thaís Muller				Top 12	
1996	Danielle Albuquerque					
1995	Janalívia do Nascimento Carneiro					Won Miss Congeniality.
1994	Humberlena de Albuquerque Chacon				Top 12	
1993	No delegate sent in 1993 due to Miss Brazil 1993 being appointed rather than having a contest.					
1992	Fabiana Pirro Tavares de Lima				Top 12	
1991	No delegate sent in 1991.					
1990	No contest in 1990.					
1989	Amélia Augusta da Cruz Fonsêca				4th Runner-Up	
1988	Madeleine de Vasconcelos Braga				Top 12	
1987	Cláudia Maria Pessoa Jardim				Top 12	
1986	Roberta Moreira da Silva				4th Runner-Up	
1985	Patrícia Moreira da Silva				Top 12	Won Miss Congeniality.
1984	Maria do Socorro Braga de Lira					Won Miss Congeniality.
1983	Josélia Sobrinho			Guarabira Futebol Clube		
1982	Geusa Maria Moreira de Azevedo			Treze Futebol Clube		Won Miss Congeniality.
1981	Virgínia Helena Gomes da Silva				3rd Runner-Up	
1980	Jahelina Maria Barbosa Aristóteles					
1979	Nadjla Maria Catão Cabral					
1978	Ana Maria Araújo da Rocha					
1977	Maria da Guia Corrêa Rangel					
1976	Teresa Cristina Ferreira de Freitas					
1975	Elze Quinderé Camelo			Esporte Clube Cabo Branco		
1974	Dilma Barbosa da Silva			Maravalha Praia Clube		
1973	Luzenice Santos Bezerra			Universidade Autônoma de João Pessoa		
1972	Maria Bernadete Fernandes Martins			Esporte Clube Cabo Branco		
1971	Lúcia Medeiros de Souza			GRESSE		
1970	Sirlete de Carvalho			Campinense Clube		
1969	Maria do Socorro Costa Alves			Esporte Clube Cabo Branco		Won Miss Congeniality.
1968	Ilona Pinheiro Dias de Sá			Esporte Clube Cabo Branco		
1967	Maria Laura Lins Vieira de Mello			Clube dos Oficiais do 1º GPT E		
1966	Zélia Maria Neves de Medeiros			Esporte Clube Cabo Branco		
1965	Cleide Lira Pedrosa			Esporte Clube Cabo Branco		Won Best State Costume.
1964	Rosalma Andrade			Campinense Clube		
1963	Kalina Lígia Duarte Nogueira			GRESSE		
1962	Terezinha Arraes de Alencar					
1961	Inês Gomes Pessoa			Clube Aquático Campinense		
1960	Maria das Mercês Morais			Clube Astréa		
1959	Glícia Coelho Chianca			Clube Astréa		
1958	Stella Maria Stuckert de Vasconcelos			Clube Astréa		
1957	Maria Zélia de Almeida Cardoso			Alagoa Nova		
1956	Margarida Vasconcelos			Cabaceiras		
1955	Maria Bernadete Silva			Esporte Clube Cabo Branco		
1954	No delegate sent in 1954 as the contest didn't exist until 1955.					
