= 2015 Campeonato Paraibano =

Campeonato Paraibano de Futebol
- Season: 2015
- Champions: Campinense
- Relegated: Lucena and Miramar
- Copa do Brasil: Campinense and Botafogo-PB
- Série D: Campinense
- Copa do Nordeste: Campinense and Botafogo-PB
- Matches played: 102
- Goals scored: 282 (2.76 per match)
- Top goalscorer: 15 goals (Rafael Oliveira, Botafogo-PB)
- Biggest home win: Atlético Cajazeirense 7–2 Auto Esporte, Round 11, 5 April 2015
- Biggest away win: Atlético Cajazeirense 0–4 Campinense, Round 9, 22 April 2015; Miramar 0–4 Campinense, Round 2, 7 February 2015
- Highest scoring: 9 goals (Atlético Cajazeirense 7–2 Auto Esporte, Round 11, 5 April 2015)
- Longest winning run: 8 (Campinense)
- Longest unbeaten run: 12 (Campinense)
- Longest winless run: 13 (Miramar)
- Longest losing run: 7 (Miramar)

The 2015 Campeonato Paraibano de Futebol was the 105th edition of Paraíba's top professional football league. The competition ran from 18 January to 13 June. The champions, for the 19th time, were Campinense.

== Format ==
The competition was divided into two stages.

In the first stage, the ten teams faced each other home and away for a total of 18 games. The top four teams qualified to the second stage. The bottom two teams were relegated to the second division.

In the second stage, the four qualifying teams faced each other home and away for a total of 6 games. The team winning the second stage was declared champion.

=== Qualification ===
The champions qualified to participate in the 2016 Copa do Brasil. The best placed team (other than Botafogo-PB) qualified to participate in the 2015 Campeonato Brasileiro Série D. The champions and vice champions qualified to participate in the 2016 Copa do Nordeste.

== Participating teams ==
Club	Home city	2014 result
Atlético Cajazeirense	Cajazeiras	6th
Auto Esporte	João Pessoa	3rd
Botafogo-PB	João Pessoa	1st
Campinense	Campina Grande	2nd
CSP	João Pessoa	4th
Lucena	Lucena	1st (2nd division)
Miramar	Cabedelo	2nd (2nd division)
Santa Cruz-PB	Santa Rita	7th
Sousa	Sousa	5th
Treze	Campina Grande	8th

== First stage ==
=== Standings ===
Pos	Team	Pld	W	D	L	GF	GA	GD	Pts	Qualification
1	Botafogo-PB	18	13	2	3	37	18	+19	41	Qualification for Second stage
2	Campinense	18	12	4	2	38	15	+23	40	Qualification for Second stage
3	Treze	18	9	6	3	27	16	+11	33	Qualification for Second stage
4	Auto Esporte	18	8	5	5	23	17	+6	29	Qualification for Second stage
5	CSP	18	7	4	7	21	21	0	25	
6	Sousa	18	7	4	7	22	26	−4	25	
7	Atlético Cajazeirense	18	4	7	7	28	33	−5	19	
8	Santa Cruz-PB	18	3	7	8	20	31	−11	16	
9	Lucena	18	3	5	10	21	32	−11	14	Relegated to Second Division
10	Miramar	18	1	2	15	12	40	−28	5	Relegated to Second Division

Updated to match(es) played on 8 May 2015. Source:
Rules for classification: 1) points; 2) wins; 3) goal difference; 4) number of goals scored; 5) least red cards; 6) least yellow cards; 7) Seeding by FPF

== Second stage ==
=== Standings ===
Pos	Team	Pld	W	D	L	GF	GA	GD	Pts	Qualification
1	Campinense	6	4	1	1	11	4	+7	13	Champion
2	Botafogo-PB	6	2	3	1	9	8	+1	9	Runners up
3	Treze	6	1	3	2	7	9	−2	6	
4	Auto Esporte	6	0	3	3	6	12	−6	3	

Updated to match(es) played on 13 June 2015. Source:
Rules for classification: 1) points; 2) wins; 3) goal difference; 4) number of goals scored; 5) least red cards; 6) least yellow cards; 7) Seeding by FPF
