= Tiquinho Soares =

Brazilian footballer

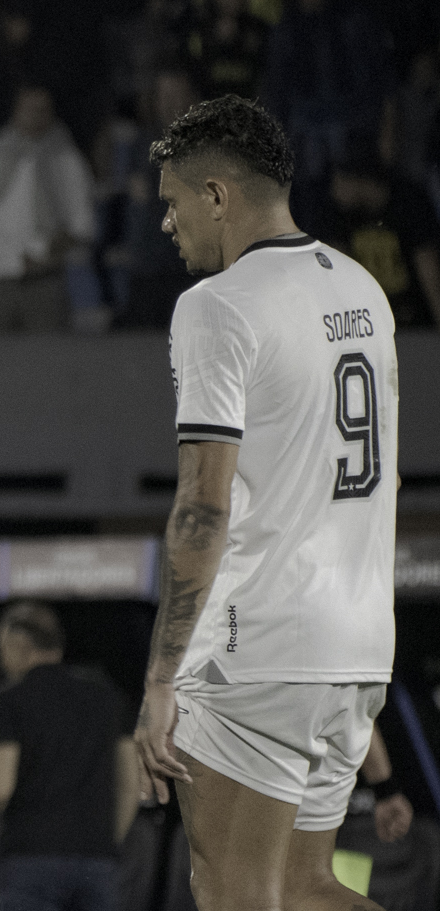
- Soares with Botafogo in 2024

Personal information
- Full name: Francisco das Chagas Soares dos Santos
- Date of birth: 17 January 1991 (age 35)
- Place of birth: Sousa, Brazil
- Height: 1.87 m (6 ft 2 in)
- Position: Striker

Team information
- Current team: Botafogo
- Number: 9

Youth career
- 2007–2008: Palmeiras das Rocas
- 2008: Corinthians Alagoano
- 2009: América de Natal

Senior career*
Years	Team	Apps	(Gls)
2009–2010	América de Natal	14	(2)
2010	Botafogo-PB	0	(0)
2011	Sousa	0	(0)
2012–2016	CSP	17	(10)
2012	→ Caicó (loan)	7	(1)
2012	→ Visão Celeste (loan)	6	(0)
2013	→ Cerâmica (loan)	9	(2)
2013	→ Treze (loan)	9	(0)
2014	→ Veranópolis (loan)	16	(4)
2014	→ Pelotas (loan)	3	(0)
2014	→ Lucena (loan)	7	(3)
2014–2016	→ Nacional (loan)	42	(12)
2016–2017	Vitória Guimarães	16	(7)
2017–2020	Porto	97	(45)
2020	Tianjin TEDA	4	(0)
2021–2022	Olympiacos	33	(9)
2022–2024	Botafogo	94	(35)
2025–2026	Santos	38	(7)
2026	→ Mirassol (loan)	7	(0)
2026–	Botafogo	8	(1)
- * Club domestic league appearances and goals as of 19:38, 5 November 2026 (UTC)

Francisco das Chagas Soares dos Santos (born 17 January 1991), known as Soares or Tiquinho, is a Brazilian professional footballer who plays as a striker for Campeonato Brasileiro Série A club Botafogo.

Having started his career in the lower leagues of his homeland, he moved to Portugal aged 23. He played 155 Primeira Liga games for Nacional, Vitória de Guimarães and Porto, scoring 64 goals and winning two league titles with the last of those clubs. After winning the Super League Greece with Olympiacos in 2022, he joined Botafogo in Série A.

== Club career ==
=== Early career ===
Born in Sousa, Paraíba, but raised in Natal, Rio Grande do Norte, Soares started his career with Palmeiras FC das Rocas. He moved to América de Natal in 2009 to complete his development.

Soares made his professional debut for the latter club on 14 August 2010, coming on as a substitute in a 2–1 Série B home loss against Vila Nova. He only appeared in one further match in the championship, before being released on 3 September of that year.

Soares subsequently represented Botafogo da Paraíba, Sousa, CSP, Caicó, Visão Celeste, Cerâmica, Treze, Veranópolis, Pelotas and Lucena.

=== Nacional ===
On 27 January 2015, Soares moved abroad for the first time in his career after signing with Primeira Liga side Nacional, still owned by CSP. He made his debut on 21 February, replacing Lucas João in a 3–1 away loss against Braga.

Soares scored his first goal abroad on 20 April 2015, equalising the 1–1 Madeira derby at Marítimo. The following 20 March, he scored a brace in a 3–2 home win over Vitória de Guimarães.

=== Vitória Guimarães ===
On 25 May 2016, Soares signed for Vitória de Guimarães. He made his debut for his new team on 14 August, starting in a 1–0 home loss to Braga, and scored his first goal 12 days later in a 5–3 win against Paços de Ferreira also at the Estádio D. Afonso Henriques, through a penalty.

On 4 November 2016, Soares scored a double in a 2–1 home defeat of former club Nacional. He finished his spell in Minho with 22 official appearances and nine goals.

=== Porto ===
On 23 January 2017, Soares signed a four-and-a-half-year contract with Porto, with a €40 million clause. His first match took place on 4 February, when he started and netted twice in a 2–1 home victory over Sporting CP.

Soares made his UEFA Champions League debut on 22 February 2017, starting in a 2–0 home loss to Juventus in the round of 16. In his first full season, he scored eight goals from 24 games to help the club to win the national championship after a five-year wait.

Soares was not initially included in the 2018–19 Champions League squad by manager Sérgio Conceição, due to injury. On 18 January 2019, he put three past Chaves in a 4–1 away victory, his tally of 15 over the campaign eventually being the best for Porto and fourth-best in the league. On 25 May he opened the scoring in the final of the Taça de Portugal and also converted his team's first shot in the penalty shootout after the 2–2 draw, but Sporting were victorious; he dedicated his goal to goalkeeper Iker Casillas, who had suffered a heart attack weeks earlier.

On 27 February 2020, Soares was sent off for the first time in his career as the side lost 3–1 at home to Bayer Leverkusen (5–2 aggregate) in the last 32 of the UEFA Europa League, for elbowing Jonathan Tah in the face.

=== Tianjin TEDA ===
Soares moved to the Chinese Super League in September 2020, agreeing to a three-year and three-month deal at Tianjin TEDA. The transfer fee was estimated at around €10 million, as was his total salary.

=== Olympiacos ===
On 31 May 2021, Soares joined Olympiacos of the Super League Greece on a three-year contract. On 22 September, he scored twice in a 4–1 home win against Apollon Smyrnis. On 22 December, he repeated the feat in the 2–0 defeat of Levadiakos in the round of 16 of the Greek Football Cup, following assists from Mathieu Valbuena.

=== Botafogo ===
Soares returned to Brazil in August 2022 after seven years, with the 31-year-old signing for Botafogo. He made his Campeonato Brasileiro Série A debut at the age of 31 on 4 September, starting in a 3–1 win at Fortaleza; thirteen days later, he scored his first goal to conclude a 2–0 win over Coritiba at the Estádio Olímpico Nilton Santos. He finished the season with six goals from 14 games, the Glorioso's second top scorer with one behind Erison despite his late arrival.

In 2023, Soares scored a career-best 29 goals despite struggling with injuries in the latter stages of the season. In the following campaign, he won both the Copa Libertadores and the Brazilian League, but lost his starting spot after Igor Jesus was acquired.

=== Santos ===
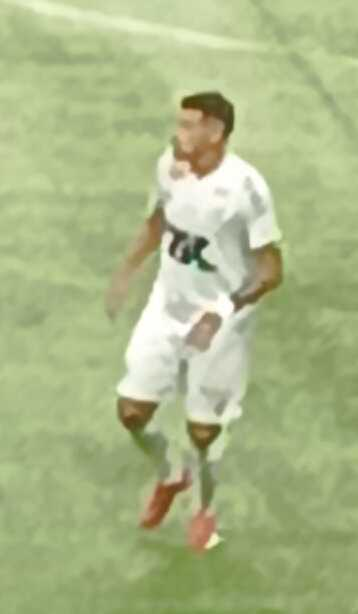
Soares playing for Santos in 2025

On 24 January 2025, Soared joined Santos on a three-year deal. He made his debut the following day in a 2–1 away loss to Velo Clube, and scored his first goal on 5 February, opening the 1–1 home draw against Botafogo-SP through a penalty.

On 20 February 2026, Soares was loaned to fellow top-division Mirassol for the season. On 18 July, he left after terminating his contract with Santos due to unpaid wages.

== Career statistics ==
As of 19 May 2026

Club	Season	League			State league (Note: Includes Campeonato Potiguar, Campeonato Paraibano, Campeonato Gaúcho, Campeonato Carioca, Campeonato Paulista)		National cup (Note: Includes Copa do Brasil, Taça de Portugal, Chinese FA Cup, Greek Football Cup)		League cup (Note: Includes Taça da Liga)		Continental		Other		Total	
Club	Season	Division	Apps	Goals	Apps	Goals	Apps	Goals	Apps	Goals	Apps	Goals	Apps	Goals	Apps	Goals
América de Natal	2009	Série B	0	0	1	0	0	0	—		—		—		1	0
América de Natal	2010	Série B	2	0	11	2	0	0	—		—		0	0	13	2
América de Natal	Total		2	0	12	2	0	0	—		—		0	0	14	2
Botafogo-PB	2010	Paraibano	—		—		—		—		—		10 (Note: Appearances in Copa Paraíba)	3	10	3
Sousa	2011	Paraibano	—		0	0	—		—		—		3	1	3	1
CSP	2012	Paraibano	—		—		—		—		—		6	3	6	3
CSP	2013	Paraibano	—		17	10	—		—		—		—		17	10
CSP	Total		—		17	10	—		—		—		6	3	23	13
Caicó (loan)	2012	Potiguar	—		7	1	—		—		—		—		7	1
Visão Celeste (loan)	2012	Potiguar 2ª Divisão	—		6	0	—		—		—		—		6	0
Cerâmica (loan)	2013	Gaúcho	—		9	2	—		—		—		—		9	2
Treze (loan)	2013	Série C	9	0	—		—		—		—		—		9	0
Veranópolis (loan)	2014	Gaúcho	—		16	4	—		—		—		—		16	4
Pelotas (loan)	2014	Série D	3	0	—		—		—		—		—		3	0
Lucena (loan)	2014	Paraibano 2ª Divisão	—		7	3	—		—		—		—		7	3
Nacional (loan)	2014–15	Primeira Liga	12	2	—		2	0	0	0	—		—		14	2
Nacional (loan)	2015–16	Primeira Liga	30	10	—		2	1	2	0	—		—		34	11
Nacional (loan)	Total		42	12	—		4	1	2	0	—		—		48	13
Vitória Guimarães	2016–17	Primeira Liga	16	7	—		3	2	3	0	—		—		22	9
Porto	2016–17	Primeira Liga	15	12	—		—		—		2 (Note: Appearances in UEFA Champions League)	0	—		17	12
Porto	2017–18	Primeira Liga	24	8	—		4	1	3	1	3	1	—		34	11
Porto	2018–19	Primeira Liga	28	15	—		5	4	3	3	4	1	1 (Note: Appearance in Supertaça Cândido de Oliveira)	0	41	23
Porto	2019–20	Primeira Liga	30	10	—		5	2	5	4	8 (Note: One appearance in UEFA Champions League, seven appearances and three goals in UEFA Europa League)	3	—		48	19
Porto	Total		97	45	—		14	7	11	8	17	5	1	0	140	65
Tianjin TEDA	2020	Chinese Super League	4	0	—		4	2	—		—		—		8	2
Olympiacos	2021–22	Super League Greece	33	9	—		6	2	—		8 (Note: Appearances in UEFA Europa League)	3	—		47	14
Olympiacos	2022–23	Super League Greece	0	0	—		0	0	—		4 (Note: Two appearances in UEFA Champions League, two appearances in UEFA Europa League)	0	—		4	0
Olympiacos	Total		33	9	—		6	2	—		12	8	—		51	14
Botafogo	2022	Série A	14	6	—		—		—		—		—		14	6
Botafogo	2023	Série A	33	17	11	4	4	5	—		6 (Note: Appearances in Copa Sudamericana)	3	—		54	29
Botafogo	2024	Série A	27	5	9	3	1	0	—		13 (Note: Appearances in Copa Libertadores)	1	—		50	9
Botafogo	Total		74	28	20	7	5	5	—		19	4	—		118	44
Santos	2025	Série A	27	2	11	5	2	0	—		—		—		40	7
Santos	2026	Série A	0	0	0	0	0	0	—		0	0	—		0	0
Santos	Total		27	2	11	5	2	0	—		0	0	—		40	7
Mirassol (loan)	2026	Série A	7	0	0	0	2	1	—		1	0	—		10	1
Career total			314	103	105	34	40	20	16	8	49	17	20	7	544	189

== Honours ==
Botafogo-PB

- Copa Paraíba: 2010

CSP

- Copa Paraíba: 2012

Lucena

- Campeonato Paraibano Second Division: 2014

Porto

- Primeira Liga: 2017–18, 2019–20
- Taça de Portugal: 2019–20
- Supertaça Cândido de Oliveira: 2018

Olympiacos

- Super League Greece: 2021–22

Botafogo

- Campeonato Brasileiro Série A: 2024
- Taça Rio: 2023, 2024
- Copa Libertadores: 2024

Individual

- Copa do Brasil top scorer: 2023
- Campeonato Brasileiro Série A Player of the Month: April 2023, May 2023, June 2023, July 2023
