= 2025 Campeonato Paraibano =

115th edition of Paraíba's football league

Campeonato Paraibano de Futebol
- Season: 2025
- Dates: 11 January – 30 March

The 2025 Campeonato Paraibano de Futebol is the 115th edition of Paraíba's top professional football league. The competition started on 11 January and scheduled to conclude on 30 March 2025.

== Format ==
The format of the competition was amended from the previous season, and featured a group stage where each of the ten teams faced each other once. The top four proceeded to a knockout semi-final and final, each over two legs. The bottom two teams in the group stage were relegated to the second division.

Due to each team having nine games in the group stage, some had to have 5 home games and others had to have 4 home games, which was decided by drawing of lots.

The semi-final was drawn according to finishing places in the group stage. First played fourth and second played third, with the higher placed team at home in the second legs. The best performing team in the semi-finals was at home in the second leg of the final.

== Participating teams ==
Club	Home City	Manager	2024 Result
Auto Esporte Clube	João Pessoa	Ramiro Souza	2nd (Second Division)
Botafogo Futebol Clube (Botafogo-PB)	João Pessoa	João Burse	3rd
Campinense Clube	Campina Grande	Luan Carlos	6th
Nacional Atlético Clube (Nacional de Patos)	Patos	Flávio Araújo	7th
Esporte Clube de Patos	Patos	Marcos Nascimento	1st (Second Division)
Picuiense	Picuí	Izaias Almeida	6th (Second Division)
Pombal Esporte Clube	Pombal	Manú	8th
Serra Branca Esporte Clube	Serra Branca	Marcelinho Paraíba	2nd
Sousa Esporte Clube	Sousa	Thardelli Abrantes	4th
Treze Futebol Clube	Campina Grande	Dema	1st

== Group phase ==
Pos	Team	Pld	W	D	L	GF	GA	GD	Pts	Qualification
1	Sousa	6	5	1	0	10	1	+9	16	Advance to semi-final stage
2	Serra Branca	6	3	1	2	12	5	+7	10	Advance to semi-final stage
3	Campinense	6	3	1	2	11	5	+6	10	Advance to semi-final stage
4	Botafogo-PB	6	3	1	2	10	6	+4	10	Advance to semi-final stage
5	Treze	5	3	1	1	7	4	+3	10	
6	Esporte de Patos	6	2	1	3	9	13	−4	7	
7	Pombal	6	2	0	4	4	8	−4	6	
8	Nacional de Patos	5	1	2	2	9	11	−2	5	
9	Auto Esporte	5	0	3	2	4	6	−2	3	Relegated to Campeonato Paraibano Second Division
10	Picuiense	5	0	1	4	2	19	−17	1	Relegated to Campeonato Paraibano Second Division

Updated to match(es) played on 4 February 2025. Source:
Rules for classification: 1) points; 2) wins; 3) goal difference; 4) number of goals scored; 5) least red cards; 6) least yellow cards.

== Semi-final ==
The semi-finals paired first vs fourth and second vs third from the group stage and were played over two legs, with a penalty shoot-out deciding the tie if results were level. The higher placed team in the group stage were given home advantage in the second leg.

Team 1	Agg.	Team 2	1st leg	2nd leg
4th		1st		
3rd		2nd		
