= Ferreira (footballer, born 1985) =

Brazilian footballer (born 1985)

Personal information
- Full name: Severino Ferreira de Barros
- Date of birth: 2 February 1985 (age 41)
- Place of birth: Solânea, Brazil
- Position: Goalkeeper

Youth career
- Desportiva-PB

Senior career*
| Years | Team | Apps | (Gls) |
| 2006–2008 | Desportiva-PB | | |
| 2008 | Internacional-PB | | |
| 2009 | Real Independente | | |
| 2009–2010 | Desportiva-PB | | |
| 2010–2011 | CSP | | |
| 2011 | Flamengo-PB | | |
| 2012–2013 | CSP | | |
| 2013 | Santa Cruz-PB | | |
| 2014 | CSP | | |
| 2014 | Lucena | | |
| 2014–2015 | Serra Talhada | | |
| 2015 | CSP | | |
| 2016 | Coruripe | | |
| 2016 | ASA | | |
| 2017 | Sergipe | | |
| 2017–2018 | Noroeste | | |
| 2019 | Sergipe | | |
| 2019 | Coruripe | | |
| 2019 | Internacional-PB | | |
| 2020 | Força e Luz | | |
| 2020 | Potiguar de Mossoró | | |
| 2021 | Freipaulistano | | |
| 2021 | Desportiva-PB | | |
| 2022 | Murici | | |
| 2022 | Olímpico | | |
- * Club domestic league appearances and goals as of 31 October 2023

Severino Ferreira de Barros (born 2 February 1985), simply known as Ferreira, is a Brazilian former professional footballer who played as a goalkeeper.

== Career ==
A goalkeeper who played for several teams in the northeast region of Brazil, Ferreira gained prominence for the goals he scored, having scored 5 in total during his career.

== Honours ==
CSP

- Copa Paraíba: 2012

== See also ==
- List of goalscoring goalkeepers
