= Nino Paraíba =

Brazilian footballer

Personal information
- Full name: Severino do Ramo Clementino da Silva
- Date of birth: 10 January 1986 (age 40)
- Place of birth: Rio Tinto, Brazil
- Height: 1.68 m (5 ft 6 in)
- Position: Right back

Team information
- Current team: Londrina
- Number: 2

Youth career
- América de Natal

Senior career*
Years	Team	Apps	(Gls)
2005–2007	Desportiva Guarabira		
2008	Ceará	0	(0)
2008	Náutico	0	(0)
2009	Sousa	21	(1)
2009	Campinense	1	(0)
2009–2015	Vitória	168	(5)
2015	→ Avaí (loan)	35	(0)
2016–2017	Ponte Preta	87	(1)
2018–2021	Bahia	136	(4)
2022	Ceará	35	(1)
2023	América Mineiro	13	(0)
2023	Paysandu	1	(0)
2025–2026	Cuiabá	20	(0)
2026–	Londrina	11	(0)
- * Club domestic league appearances and goals as of 18 November 2026

Severino do Ramo Clementino da Silva (born 10 January 1986), known as Nino Paraíba or simply Nino, is a Brazilian footballer who plays as a right back for Londrina.

== Club career ==
=== Early career ===
Born in Rio Tinto, Paraíba, Nino made his senior debut with Desportiva Guarabira in 2006. In 2008, after an unassuming spell at Ceará, he joined Náutico, but was subsequently released.

In December 2008 Nino was presented at Sousa, and was a starter with the side crowned champions of 2009 Campeonato Paraibano.

=== Vitória ===
On 2 June 2009, after being linked to a move to Bahia, Nino signed for Vitória. He made his first team – and Série A – debut on 4 July, coming on as a second-half substitute for Apodi in a 1–2 away loss against Flamengo.

A backup option during his first two seasons, Nino only became a regular starter during the 2011 campaign, in the Série B. He scored his first league goal on 27 September of that year, netting the last in a 2–0 home win against Ponte Preta.

On 15 June 2012 Nino signed a new three-year deal with Vitória, until 2015. Due to injuries, he lost his first-choice status during the 2013 season to Ayrton.

On 15 April 2015, after being deemed surplus to requirements, Nino was loaned to Avaí in the top tier until December. He was an undisputed starter for the side, featuring in 35 matches as his side suffered relegation.

=== Ponte Preta ===
On 9 December 2015, Nino signed a one-year deal with Ponte Preta. On 6 September of the following year, he extended his contract until December 2017.

On 14 May 2017 Nino scored his first goal in the main category of Brazilian football, netting the second in a 4–0 home routing of Sport Recife.

=== Bahia ===
On 3 January 2018, free agent Nino signed for Bahia also in the top tier. He was a regular starter for the side, winning three Campeonato Baiano titles in a row but leaving after their relegation in 2021.

=== Ceará ===
On 30 December 2021, Nino signed a contract with Ceará still in the first division. The following 23 November, after another relegation, he left the club.

=== América Mineiro ===
On 26 November 2022, Nino was announced at América Mineiro on a one-year deal. On 15 May of the following year, the club accepted his request for a contract rescision, after having his name involved in the 2023 Brazilian football match-fixing scandal.

== Career statistics ==
As of 15 May 2023

Club	Season	League			State League		Cup		Continental		Other		Total	
Club	Season	Division	Apps	Goals	Apps	Goals	Apps	Goals	Apps	Goals	Apps	Goals	Apps	Goals
Sousa	2009	Paraibano	—		21	1	—		—		—		21	1
Campinense	2009	Série B	1	0	—		—		—		—		1	0
Vitória	2009	Série A	9	0	—		0	0	2 (Note: Appearance(s) in Copa Sudamericana)	0	—		11	0
Vitória	2010	Série A	14	0	19	0	8	1	—		—		41	1
Vitória	2011	Série B	33	1	15	1	1	0	—		—		49	2
Vitória	2012	Série B	23	3	4	0	2	0	—		—		29	3
Vitória	2013	Série A	7	0	10	0	3	0	—		5 (Note: Appearance(s) in Copa do Nordeste)	0	25	0
Vitória	2014	Série A	22	0	5	0	1	0	3	0	2	0	33	0
Vitória	2015	Série B	0	0	7	0	—		—		8	0	15	0
Vitória	Total		108	4	60	1	15	1	5	0	15	0	203	6
Avaí (loan)	2015	Série A	35	0	—		0	0	—		—		35	0
Ponte Preta	2016	Série A	27	0	11	0	6	0	—		—		44	0
Ponte Preta	2017	Série A	34	1	15	0	2	0	6	0	—		57	1
Ponte Preta	Total		61	1	26	0	8	0	6	0	—		101	1
Bahia	2018	Série A	22	0	9	1	2	0	4	0	7	0	44	1
Bahia	2019	Série A	29	2	5	0	10	1	2	0	5	0	51	3
Bahia	2020	Série A	33	1	6	0	0	0	6	0	2	1	47	2
Bahia	2021	Série A	32	0	0	0	4	0	5	1	10	0	51	1
Bahia	Total		116	3	20	1	16	1	17	1	24	1	193	7
Ceará	2022	Série A	33	1	2	0	6	1	7	0	7	0	55	2
América Mineiro	2023	Série A	4	0	9	0	3	0	2	0	—		18	0
Career total			358	9	138	3	48	3	37	1	46	1	627	17

== Honours ==
Sousa

- Campeonato Paraibano: 2009

Vitória

- Campeonato Baiano: 2010, 2013

Bahia

- Campeonato Baiano: 2018, 2019, 2020
- Copa do Nordeste: 2021
