= Campeonato Paraibano Second Division =

Football league in Paraíba, Brazil

- Organising body: FPF
- Founded: 1960; 66 years ago
- Country: Brazil
- State: Paraíba
- Level on pyramid: 2
- Promotion to: Campeonato Paraibano
- Relegation to: 3rd Division
- Current champions: Confiança (1st title) (2025)
- Most championships: Esporte de Patos; Estrela do Mar (4 titles each)
- Website: FPF Official website

The Campeonato Paraibano Second Division is the second tier of the professional state football league in the Brazilian state of Paraíba. It is run by the Paraíba Football Federation (FPF).

== List of champions ==
=== Campeonato Paraibano Misto ===
Season	Champions	Runners-up
1960	Red Cross (1)	Botafogo de Cabedelo
1961	União João Pessoa (1)	5 de Agosto
1962	Estrela do Mar (1)	5 de Agosto
1963	5 de Agosto (1)	São Cristóvão
1964	Estrela do Mar (2)	São Cristóvão
1965	Íbis (1)	Guarany
1966	Estrela do Mar (3)	Íbis
1967	Estrela do Mar (4)	Íbis
1968	Auto Esporte (1)	Estrela do Mar
1969	Guarany (1)	Onze

=== Segunda Divisão Profissional ===
Season	Champions	Runners-up
1991	Sousa (1)	Atlético Cajazeirense
1992	Socremo (1)	Atalaia
1993	Vila Branca (1)	Sociedade
1994	Santa Cruz (1)	Catolé
1995	Ouro Velho (1)	Guarabira
1996	Santos (1)	Nacional de Cabedelo
1997	Not held	
1998	Serrano (1)	Perilima
1999	Not held	
2000	Santa Cruz (2)	Perilima
2001	Miramar (1)	Perilima
2002–2003	Not held	
2004	Nacional de Cabedelo (1)	Perilima
2005	Esporte de Patos (1)	Desportiva
2006	Auto Esporte (2)	Perilima
2007	Queimadense (1)	Cruzeiro
2008	Internacional (1)	Paraíba
2009	Desportiva (1)	Atlético Cajazeirense
2010	CSP (1)	Miramar
2011	Paraíba (1)	Flamengo
2012	Atlético Cajazeirense (1)	Cruzeiro
2013	Esporte de Patos (2)	Santa Cruz
2014	Lucena (1)	Miramar
2015	Esporte de Patos (3)	Paraíba
2016	Internacional (2)	Serrano
2017	Nacional de Patos (1)	Desportiva
2018	Esporte de Patos (4)	Perilima
2019	Sport Lagoa Seca (1)	São Paulo Crystal
2020	Not held due to COVID-19 pandemic	
2021	CSP (2)	Sport Lagoa Seca
2022	Serra Branca (2)	Queimadense
2023	Atlético Cajazeirense (2)	Pombal
2024	Auto Esporte (3)	Esporte de Patos
2025	Confiança	Atlético Cajazeirense

Names change

- Lucena EC is the currently São Paulo Crystal.
- Paraiba EC is the currently Serra Branca and moved from Cajazeiras to Serra Branca.

== Titles by team ==
Teams in bold stills active.

Rank	Club	Winners	Winning years
1	**Esporte de Patos**	4	2005, 2013, 2015, 2018
1	Estrela do Mar	4	1962, 1964, 1966, 1967
3	**Auto Esporte**	3	1968, 2006, 2024
4	**Atlético Cajazeirense**	2	2012, 2023
4	**CSP**	2	2010, 2021
4	Internacional	2	2008, 2016
4	**Santa Cruz**	2	1994, 2000
4	**Serra Branca**	2	2011, 2022
9	5 de Agosto	1	1963
9	Atalaia	1	1992
9	**Desportiva**	1	2009
9	Guarany	1	1969
9	Íbis	1	1965
9	**Miramar**	1	2001
9	**Nacional de Cabedelo**	1	2004
9	**Nacional de Patos**	1	2017
9	Ouro Velho	1	1995
9	**Queimadense**	1	2007
9	Red Cross	1	1960
9	**Santos**	1	1996
9	**São Paulo Crystal**	1	2014
9	**Serrano**	1	1998
9	**Sport Lagoa Seca**	1	2019
9	União João Pessoa	1	1961
9	Vila Branca	1	1993
9	**Confiança**	1	2025

=== By city ===
City	Championships	Clubs
João Pessoa	17	Estrela do Mar (4), Auto Esporte (3), CSP (2), Internacional (2), 5 de Agosto (1), Guarany (1), Íbis (1), Red Cross (1), Santos (1), União João Pessoa (1)
Patos	5	Esporte (4), Nacional (1)
Cajazeiras	3	Atlético Cajazeirense (2), Paraíba (1)
Cabedelo	2	Miramar (1), Nacional (1)
Campina Grande	2	Serrano (2)
Santa Rita	2	Santa Cruz (2)
Bananeiras	1	Atalaia (1)
Guarabira	1	Desportiva (1)
Lagoa Seca	1	Sport Lagoa Seca (1)
Lucena	1	São Paulo Crystal (1)
Ouro Velho	1	Ouro Velho
Queimadas	1	Queimadense (1)
Serra Branca	1	Serra Branca (1)
Solanea	1	Vila Branca (1)
Sapé	1	Confiança (1)
