= João Paulo (footballer, born June 1990) =

Brazilian footballer

Personal information
- Full name: João Paulo da Silva Alves
- Date of birth: 4 June 1990 (age 36)
- Place of birth: Guarabira, Brazil
- Height: 1.69 m (5 ft 6 1/2 in)
- Position: Attacking midfielder

Team information
- Current team: Guarani
- Number: 10

Senior career*
Years	Team	Apps	(Gls)
2008–2011	Desportiva Guarabira	13	(5)
2011	→ Botafogo-PB (loan)	0	(0)
2012	Penedense	2	(0)
2012	Ypiranga-BA	3	(1)
2012	Estanciano	11	(1)
2013	União-AL	12	(2)
2013	Globo	3	(2)
2014	Sergipe	16	(7)
2014–2016	Coruripe	44	(7)
2016	ASA	18	(2)
2017–2022	Tombense	12	(2)
2017	→ Santa Cruz (loan)	25	(6)
2018	→ Paraná (loan)	7	(1)
2018	→ Atlético Goianiense (loan)	33	(8)
2019	→ Avaí (loan)	45	(10)
2020	→ Ponte Preta (loan)	32	(9)
2020–2021	→ Fortaleza (loan)	10	(0)
2021	→ Atlético Goianiense (loan)	42	(8)
2022–2023	Cruzeiro	16	(4)
2023	→ CRB (loan)	50	(7)
2024–2025	Avaí	34	(2)
2025–2026	São Bernardo	21	(2)
2026–	Guarani	16	(4)
- * Club domestic league appearances and goals as of 10 November 2026

João Paulo da Silva Alves (born 4 June 1990), simply known as João Paulo, is a Brazilian footballer who plays for Guarani.

== Career statistics ==
As of 13 October 2021

Club	Season	League			State League		Cup		Continental		Other		Total	
Club	Season	Division	Apps	Goals	Apps	Goals	Apps	Goals	Apps	Goals	Apps	Goals	Apps	Goals
Desportiva Guarabira	2011	Paraibano	—		13	5	—		—		—		13	5
Botafogo-PB	2011	Paraibano	—		0	0	—		—		2 (Note: Appearance(s) in Copa Paraíba)	0	2	0
Penedense	2012	Alagoano	—		2	0	—		—		—		2	0
Ypiranga-BA	2012	Baiano 2ª Divisão	—		3	1	—		—		—		3	1
Estanciano	2012	Sergipano 2ª Divisão	—		11	1	—		—		—		11	1
União-AL	2013	Alagoano	—		12	2	—		—		—		12	2
Globo	2013	Potiguar 2ª Divisão	—		3	2	—		—		—		3	2
Sergipe	2014	Sergipano	—		16	7	2	0	—		6 (Note: All appearance(s) in Copa do Nordeste)	2	24	9
Coruripe	2014	Série D	8	1	—		—		—		—		8	1
Coruripe	2015	Série D	8	1	13	0	2	0	—		6	0	29	1
Coruripe	2016	Alagoano	—		15	5	2	1	—		6	0	23	6
Coruripe	Subtotal		16	2	28	5	4	1	—		12	0	60	8
ASA	2016	Série C	18	2	—		—		—		—		18	2
Tombense	2017	Série C	1	0	11	2	—		—		—		12	2
Santa Cruz	2017	Série B	25	6	—		—		—		—		25	6
Paraná	2018	Série A	—		7	1	1	0	—		—		8	1
Atlético Goianiense	2018	Série B	33	8	—		—		—		—		33	8
Avaí	2019	Série A	28	5	17	5	4	0	—		—		49	10
Ponte Preta	2020	Série B	19	7	13	2	6	1	—		—		38	10
Fortaleza	2020	Série A	10	0	—		—		—		—		10	0
Fortaleza	2021	Série A	0	0	0	0	0	0	—		1	0	1	0
Fortaleza	Subtotal		10	0	0	0	0	0	—		1	0	11	0
Atlético Goianiense	2021	Série A	16	3	7	2	4	2	5 (Note: All appearance(s) in Copa Sudamericana)	0	—		32	7
Career total			176	33	143	35	21	4	5	0	21	2	366	74

== Títulos ==
Desportiva Guarabira

- Campeonato Paraibano Segunda Divisão: 2009

Globo FC

- Campeonato Potiguar Segunda Divisão: 2013

Avaí

- Campeonato Catarinense: 2019, 2025

Cruzeiro

- Campeonato Brasileiro Série B: 2022

Crb

- Campeonato Alagoano: 2023
