= Almeidão =

Stadium in João Pessoa, Brazil

Coordinates: 7°10′03″S 34°52′22″W

Estádio José Américo de Almeida Filho
- Almeidão
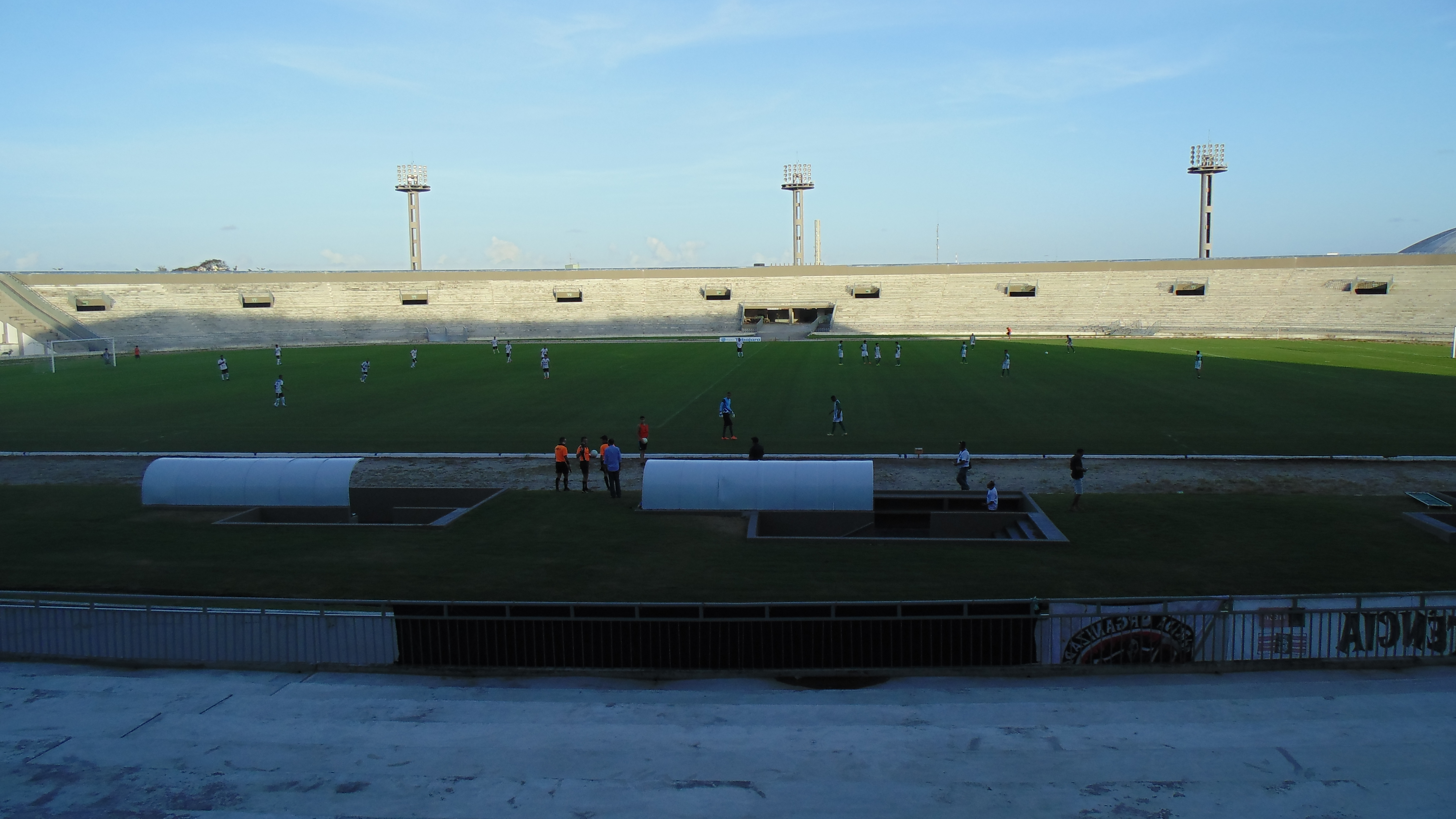
- Sisbrace
- Interactive map of Estádio José Américo de Almeida Filho
- Location: João Pessoa, Paraíba, Brazil
- Owner: Paraíba State Government
- Capacity: 25,770
- Surface: Grass

Construction
- Built: 1975
- Opened: March 9, 1975

Tenants
- Botafogo (PB); CSP; Santos (PB)

Estádio José Américo de Almeida Filho, usually known as Almeidão is a multi-purpose stadium in João Pessoa, Brazil. It is currently used mostly for football matches. It hosts the games of Botafogo (PB), CSP, and Santos (PB). The stadium holds 25,770. The stadium was built in 1975.

The Almeidão is owned by the government of Paraíba state. The stadium is named after José Américo de Almeida Filho, who was a Botafogo (PB)'s player and president, as well as a son of former state governor José Américo de Almeida.

== History ==
In 1975, the works on Almeidão were completed. The inaugural match was played on March 9 of that year, when Botafogo beat Botafogo (PB) 2–0. The first goal of the stadium was scored Tiquinho, player of Botafogo (RJ).

The stadium's attendance record currently stands at 44,268, set on November 15, 1998, when Botafogo (PB) beat Campinense 2–0.
