= Campeonato Paraibano de Futebol Feminino =

Women's football league in Paraíba, Brazil

- Founded: 2008
- Country: Brazil
- Confederation: FPF
- Promotion to: Brasileiro Série A3
- Current champions: Mixto (3rd title) (2025)
- Most championships: Botafogo (6 titles)
- Current: 2025

The Campeonato Paraibano de Futebol Feminino is the women's football state championship of Paraíba state, and is contested since 2008.

== List of champions ==
Following is the list with all recognized titles of Campeonato Paraibano Feminino:

Season	Champions	Runners-up
2008	Portuguesa (1)	Treze
2009–2010	Not held	
2011	Botafogo (1)	Auto Esporte
2012	Kashima (1)	Cabo Branco
2013–2014	Not held	
2015	Botafogo (2)	Kashima
2016	Botafogo (3)	Kashima
2017	Botafogo (4)	Kashima
2018	Botafogo (5)	Mixto
2019	Auto Esporte (1)	Mixto
2020	Botafogo (6)	Auto Esporte
2021	VF4 (1)	Botafogo
2022	VF4 (2)	Mixto
2023	Mixto (1)	VF4
2024	Mixto (2)	Botafogo
2025	Mixto (3)	Botafogo

== Titles by team ==
Teams in bold stills active.

Rank	Club	Winners	Winning years
1	**Botafogo**	6	2011, 2015, 2016, 2017, 2018, 2020
2	**Mixto**	3	2023, 2024, 2025
3	**VF4**	2	2021, 2022
3	**Auto Esporte**	1	2019
3	**Kashima**	1	2012
3	Portuguesa	1	2008
