= Grêmio Recreativo Serrano =

Serrano
- Full name: Grêmio Recreativo Serrano
- Nicknames: Lobo da Serra; Alviverde
- Founded: 20 September 1989; 36 years ago
- Ground: Presidente Vargas, Campina Grande
- Capacity: 16,000
- Chairman: Valdir Cabral
- Manager: Jairo Santos
- League: Campeonato Paraibano Segunda Divisão
- 2025: Paraibano Segunda Divisão, 7th of 10
Home colours	Away colours

Grêmio Recreativo Serrano, usually known as Serrano-PB or Serrano, is a Brazilian football club from Campina Grande.

Serrano is currently ranked sixth among Paraíba teams in CBF's national club ranking, at 185th place overall.

== History ==
Founded in 1989, the club joined the Federação Paraibana de Futebol in 1998, being crowned champions of the second division of the Campeonato Paraibano in the first year. After another five seasons in the first division, the club spent the 2005 season in the second division after one year unregistered.

Serrano returned to second division action in 2011, but was again unregistered for the following two years. The club only returned to the top tier in 2017, after finishing second in the previous year's second division.

The club finished third in the 2018 Campeonato Paraibano and qualified to the 2019 Campeonato Brasileiro Série D.

== Honours ==
- Campeonato Paraibano Second Division
  - Winners (1): 1998
