= Confiança Esporte Clube =

Brazilian football club based in Sapé, Paraíba

Confiança
- Full name: Confiança Esporte Clube
- Nickname: Bicho-Papão do Interior
- Founded: 22 April 1953; 72 years ago
- Ground: Ribeirão, Sapé, Paraíba, Brazil
- Capacity: 2,500
- League: Campeonato Paraibano
- 2025: Paraibano Segunda Divisão, 1st of 10 (champions)
Home colours	Away colours

Confiança Esporte Clube, commonly known as Confiança de Sapé or just Confiança, is a Brazilian football club based in Sapé, in the state of Paraíba, Brazil. The club was founded on 22 April 1953, and plays its home matches at the Estádio Luiz Ribeiro Coutinho, commonly known as Ribeirão, which has a capacity of 2,500 spectators.

Confiança has won the Campeonato Paraibano once.

== History ==
The club was founded on April 22, 1953. Confiança won the Campeonato Paraibano in 1997, and the Copa Rural in 2005.

== Honours ==
- Campeonato Paraibano
  - Winners (1): 1997
- Campeonato Paraibano Second Division
  - Winners (1): 2025

== Stadium ==
Confiança Esporte Clube played their home games at Estádio Luiz Ribeiro Coutinho, nicknamed Ribeirão. The stadium had a maximum capacity of 2,500 people.
