= Copa Paraíba =

- Organising body: Federação Paraibana de Futebol
- Founded: 2006
- Abolished: 2012
- Region: Paraíba, Brazil
- Qualifier for: Copa do Brasil
- Related competitions: Campeonato Paraibano
- Most successful club(s): Various

The Copa Paraíba (English: Paraíba Cup) was a tournament organized by Federação Paraibana de Futebol in order to decide one of the representatives of the state at the Copa do Brasil.

== List of champions ==
Season	Champions	Runners-up
2006	Campinense	Botafogo
2007	Not held	
2008	Nacional	Treze
2009	Treze	Botafogo
2010	Botafogo	CSP
2011	Auto Esporte	Treze
2012	CSP	Botafogo
