= Serra Branca Esporte Clube =

Serra Branca
- Full name: Serra Branca Esporte Clube
- Nickname: Carcará do Cariri
- Founded: July 7, 2005 (Paraíba Esporte Clube); July 2022 (Serra Branca Esporte Clube)
- Ground: Amigão, Campina Grande, Paraíba state, Brazil
- Capacity: 35,000
- President: Michel Alexandre
- Head coach: Marcelinho Paraíba
- League: Campeonato Brasileiro Série D Campeonato Paraibano
- 2025: Paraibano, 3rd of 10
Home colors	Away colors

Serra Branca Esporte Clube, commonly known as Serra Branca, is a Brazilian football club based in Campina Grande, Paraíba state.

== History ==
The club was founded on July 7, 2005. Paraíba won the Campeonato Paraibano Second Level in 2011, finishing ahead of Flamengo Paraibano, thus gaining promotion to the 2012 Campeonato Paraibano First Level.

In 2022 the team changed their name to Serra Branca Esporte Clube.

== Achievements ==
- Campeonato Paraibano Second Division:
  - Winners (2): 2011, 2022

== Stadium ==
Serra Branca Esporte Clube play their home games at Estádio Governador Ernani Sátyro, commonly known as Amigão. The stadium has a maximum capacity of 35,000 people.
