= Patos Airport =

Airport serving Patos, Brazil

Brig. Firmino Ayres Airport Aeroporto Brig. Firmino Ayres
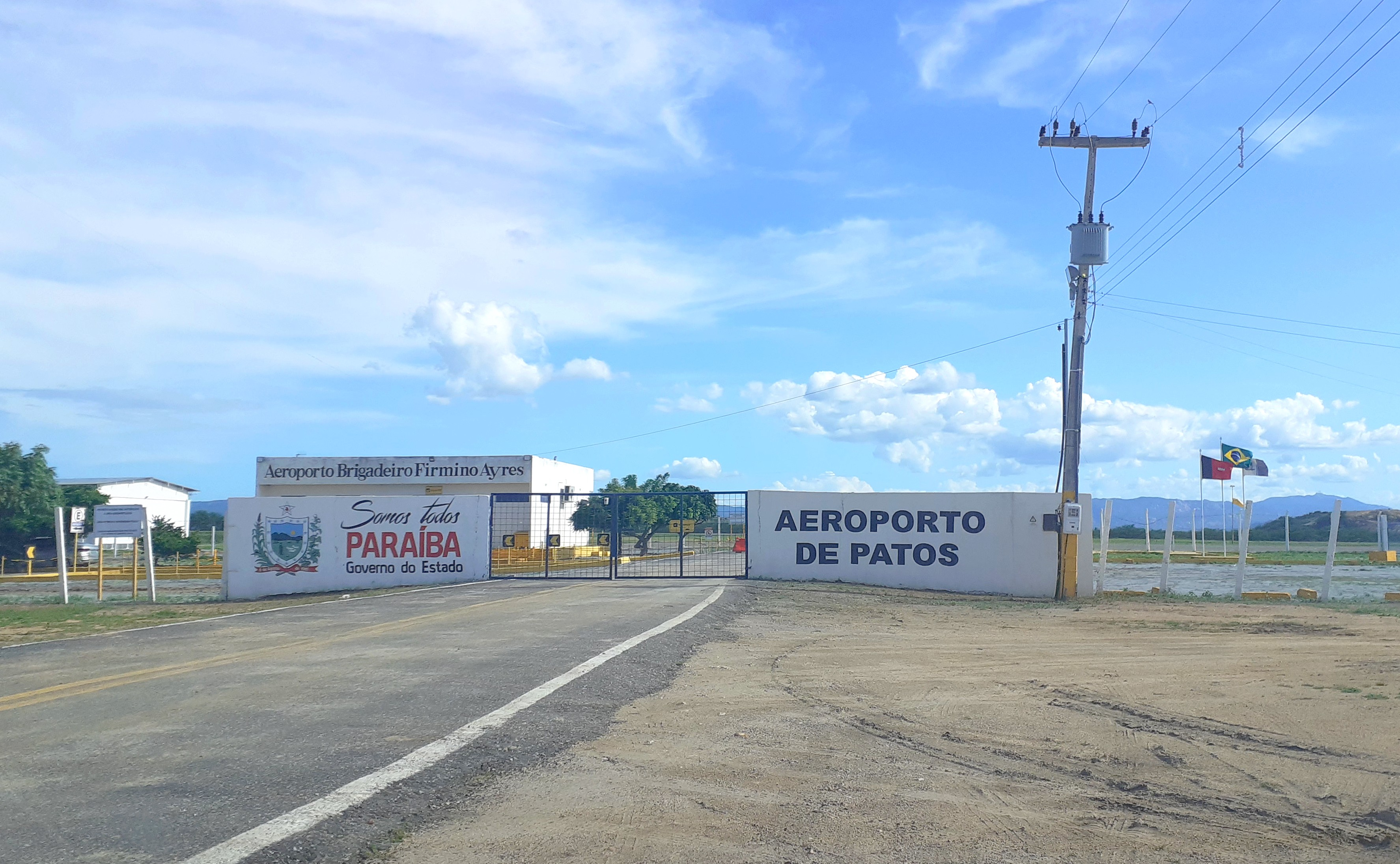
- IATA: JPO; ICAO: SNTS; LID: PB0005

Summary
- Airport type: Public
- Serves: Patos
- Opened: 12 December 1942
- Time zone: BRT (UTC−03:00)
- Elevation AMSL: 265 m (869 ft)
- Coordinates: 07°02′16″S 037°15′27″W

Map
- Location in Brazil

Runways
Direction	Length		Surface
Direction	m	ft	Surface
12/30	1,600	5,249	Asphalt
- Sources: ANAC, DECEA

Brig. Firmino Ayres Airport (IATA: JPO, ICAO: SNTS) is the airport serving Patos, Brazil.

== History ==
The airport was commissioned on 12 December 1942.

== Airlines and destinations ==
Airlines	Destinations
Azul Conecta	Recife

== Access ==
The airport is located 4 km (2 mi) from downtown Patos.

== See also ==
- List of airports in Brazil
