= Amigão =

Football stadium

- O Amigão
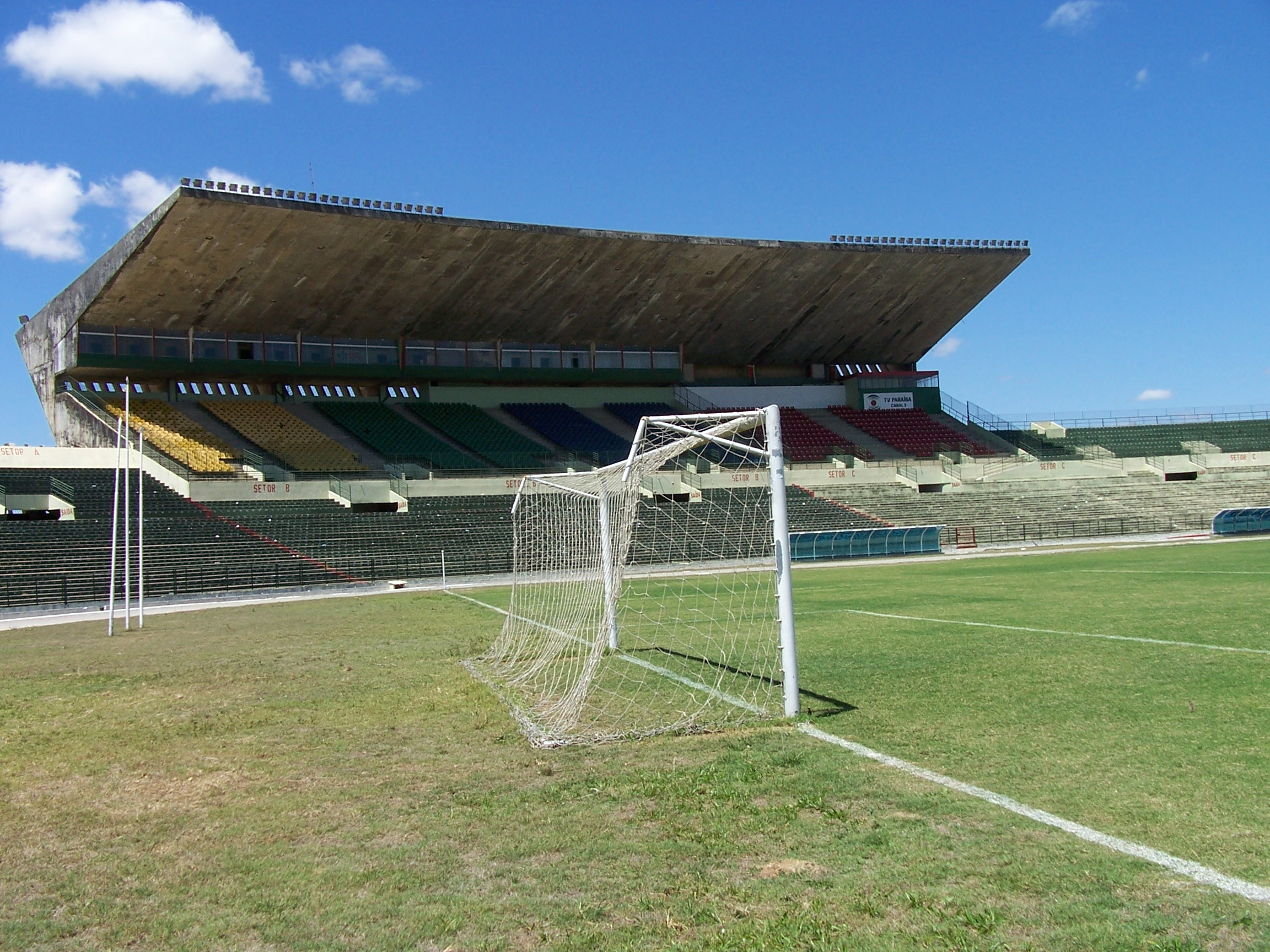
- Sisbrace
- Interactive map of Amigão
- Full name: Estádio Governador Ernani Sátyro
- Location: Campina Grande, Brazil
- Coordinates: 7°15′14″S 35°52′51″W
- Owner: Paraíba state government
- Capacity: 35,000
- Field size: 110 x 75m

Construction
- Built: 1975
- Opened: 1975

Tenants
- Treze Futebol Clube; Campinense Clube; Serra Branca Esporte Clube

Estádio Governador Ernani Sátyro, usually known by its nickname Amigão (sometimes called O Amigão), is a multi-purpose stadium in Campina Grande, Brazil. It is currently used mostly for football matches. The stadium holds 35,000. The stadium was built in 1975.

The Amigão is owned by the government of Paraíba state. The stadium is named after Ernani Sátyro, who was the governor of Paraíba state from 1971 to 1975. Amigão means Big Friend in Portuguese language and it refers to the way Ernani Sátyro called his voters, amigos velhos, meaning old friends.

== History ==
In 1975, the works on Amigão were completed. It was built in fourteen months. The inaugural match was played on 8 March of that year, when Campinense and Botafogo drew 0-0.

The first goal of the stadium was scored on 16 March 1975, by Campinense's Pedrinho Cangula when Campinense and Treze drew 1-1.

The stadium's attendance record currently stands at 41,149, set on 7 February 1982, when Flamengo beat Treze 3–1.

In 2007, Nacional de Patos played its home matches during the Brazilian Championship Third Level final stage at Amigão stadium.
