= Nacional Atlético Clube (Cabedelo) =

Nacional de Cabedelo
- Full name: Nacional Atlético Clube
- Nickname(s): Nacional-PB; Nacional Atlético Clube; Naça
- Founded: April 21, 1973
- Ground: Estádio Francisco Figueiredo de Lima, Cabedelo, Paraíba state, Brazil
- Capacity: 5,000
- President: Marcos Cláudio Costa Santos
- Head coach: Clodoaldo Cardoso
Home colors	Away colors

Nacional Atlético Clube, commonly known as Nacional de Cabedelo, is a Brazilian football club based in Cabedelo, Paraíba state.

== History ==
The club was founded on April 21, 1973. Nacional de Cabedelo won the Campeonato Paraibano Second Level in 2004.

== Honours ==
- Campeonato Paraibano Second Division
  - Winners (1): 2004

== Stadium ==
Nacional Atlético Clube play their home games at Estádio Francisco Figueiredo de Lima. The stadium has a maximum capacity of 5,000 people.
