= Santos Futebol Clube (PB) =

Santos da Paraíba
- Full name: Santos Futebol Clube
- Nickname(s): Santos de Tereré; Tigre de Jampa
- Founded: September 9, 1949
- Ground: Almeidão, João Pessoa, Paraíba state, Brazil
- Capacity: 40,000
Home colors	Away colors

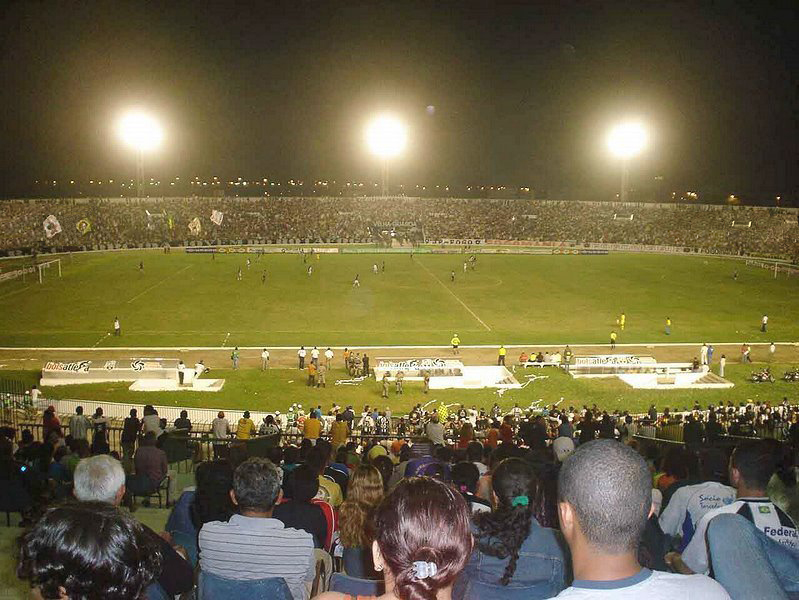
Estádio José Américo de Almeida Filho

Santos Futebol Clube, commonly known as Santos da Paraíba, is a Brazilian football club based in João Pessoa, Paraíba state. Its colors are the same as those of its famous homonym (black and white).

== History ==
The club was founded on September 9, 1949. Santos won the Campeonato Paraibano Second Level in 2010.

== Honours ==
- Campeonato Paraibano
  - Runners-up (1): 1970
- Campeonato Paraibano Second Division
  - Winners (1): 1996

== Stadium ==
Santos Futebol Clube play their home games at Almeidão. The stadium has a maximum capacity of 40,000 people.
