= Ouro Velho =

Coordinates: 7.62°S 37.1519°W

Ouro Velho, Paraíba
- Municipality
- Flag
- Interactive map of Ouro Velho, Paraíba
- Country: Brazil
- Region: South
- State: Paraíba
- Mesoregion: Cariri

Population (2020)
  - Total: 3,046
- Time zone: UTC−3 (BRT)

Ouro Velho (Central northeastern portuguese pronunciation: [ˈoɾu ˈhɛj(ŭ)]) is a municipality in the state of Paraíba in the Northeast Region of Brazil.

== See also ==
- List of municipalities in Paraíba
