= Serra Branca, Paraíba =

Coordinates: 7°28′58″S 36°39′54″W

- Municipality
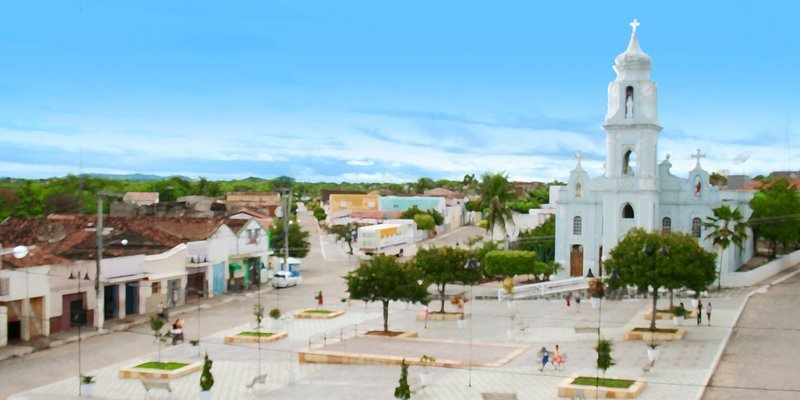

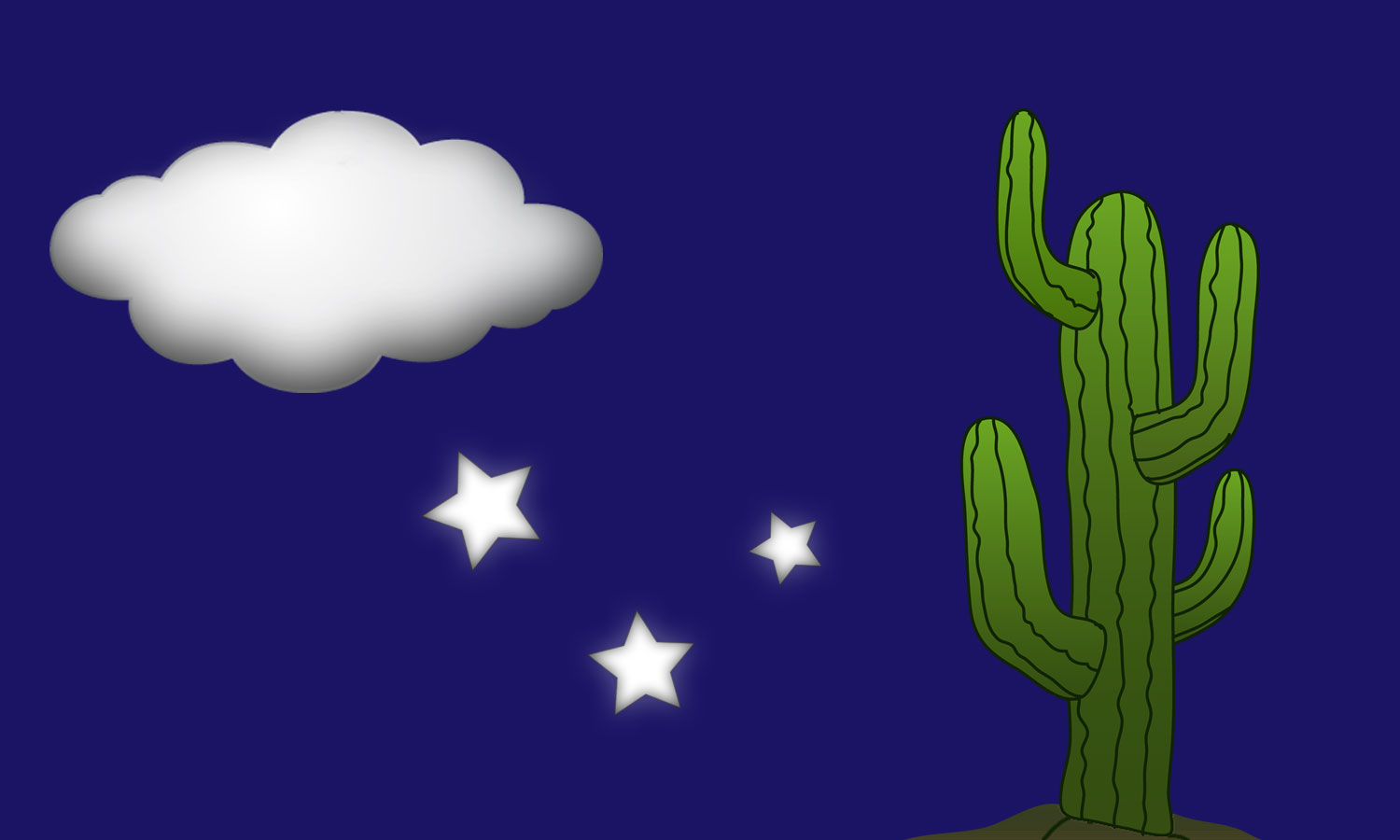
- Flag Coat of arms
- Interactive map of Serra Branca, Paraíba
- Country: Brazil
- Region: Northeast
- State: Paraíba
- Mesoregion: Boborema

Population (2020)
  - Total: 13,754
- Time zone: UTC−3 (BRT)

Serra Branca (Central northeastern portuguese pronunciation: [ˈsɛhɐ ˈbɾɐ̃kɐ]) is a municipality in the state of Paraíba in the Northeast Region of Brazil.

== See also ==
- List of municipalities in Paraíba
