= Bananeiras =

- Municipality
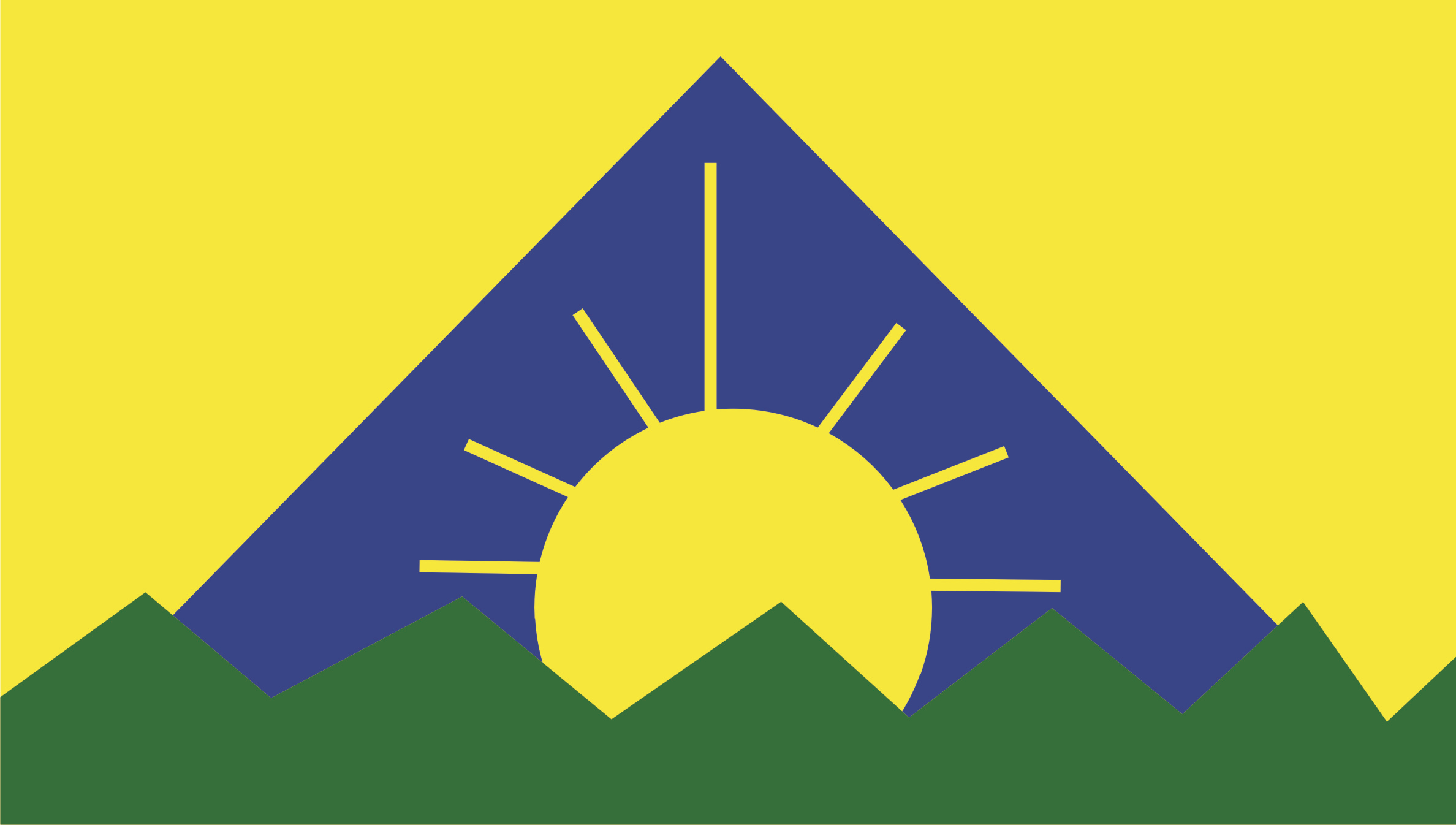
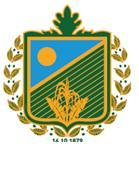
- Flag Coat of arms

- Location in Brazil
- Coordinates: 6.75°S 35.6328°W
- Country: Brazil
- Region: Northeast
- State: Paraíba
- Mesoregion: Agreste Paraibano

Population (2020)
  - Total: 21,269
- Time zone: UTC−3 (BRT)

Bananeiras (Central northeastern portuguese pronunciation: [bɐ̃nɐ̃ˈneɾɐ]) is a municipality in the state of Paraíba in the Northeast Region of Brazil.

== See also ==
- List of municipalities in Paraíba
