= Santa Cruz Recreativo Esporte Clube =

Santa Cruz
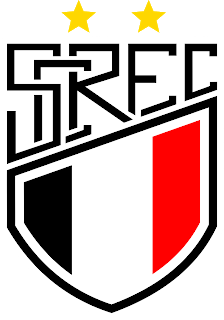
- Full name: Santa Cruz Recreativo Esporte Clube
- Nicknames: Santa Cruz de Santa Rita; Cobra do Canavial
- Founded: April 15, 1939
- Ground: Teixeirão, Santa Rita, Paraíba state, Brazil
- Capacity: 5,000
- Head Coach: Elinaldo Gomes
Home colours	Away colours

Santa Cruz Recreativo Esporte Clube, commonly known as Santa Cruz, is a Brazilian football team based in Santa Rita, Paraíba state. They competed in the Série C twice.

== History ==
The club was founded on April 15, 1939. They competed in the Série C in 1994 and in 1995, being eliminated in the Second Stage in both editions of the competition. Santa Cruz won the Campeonato Paraibano in 1995 and in 1996. The club almost ended after some fights with Programa Gol de Placa, the investigation started in 2019 and keeps archived to future expressive investigation.

== Honours ==
- Campeonato Paraibano
  - Winners (2): 1995, 1996
- Campeonato Paraibano Second Division
  - Winners (2): 1994, 2000

== Stadium ==
Santa Cruz Recreativo Esporte Clube play their home games at Estádio Virgínio Veloso Borges, nicknamed Teixeirão. The stadium has a maximum capacity of 5,000 people.

== Notable former players ==
Players that had international caps for their respective countries.

- (Brazil) Mazinho
