= Federação Paraibana de Futebol =

Brazilian football state federation

- Formation: 24 April 1947; 79 years ago
- Type: List of international sport federations
- Headquarters: João Pessoa, Paraíba, Brazil
- Official language: Portuguese
- Website: FPF

The Federação Paraibana de Futebol (English: Football Association of Paraíba state) was founded on April 24, 1947, and it manages all the official football tournaments within the state of Paraíba, which are the Campeonato Paraibano, the Campeonato Paraibano lower levels and the Copa Paraíba, and represents the clubs at the Brazilian Football Confederation (CBF).
