= Esporte Clube de Patos =

Esporte
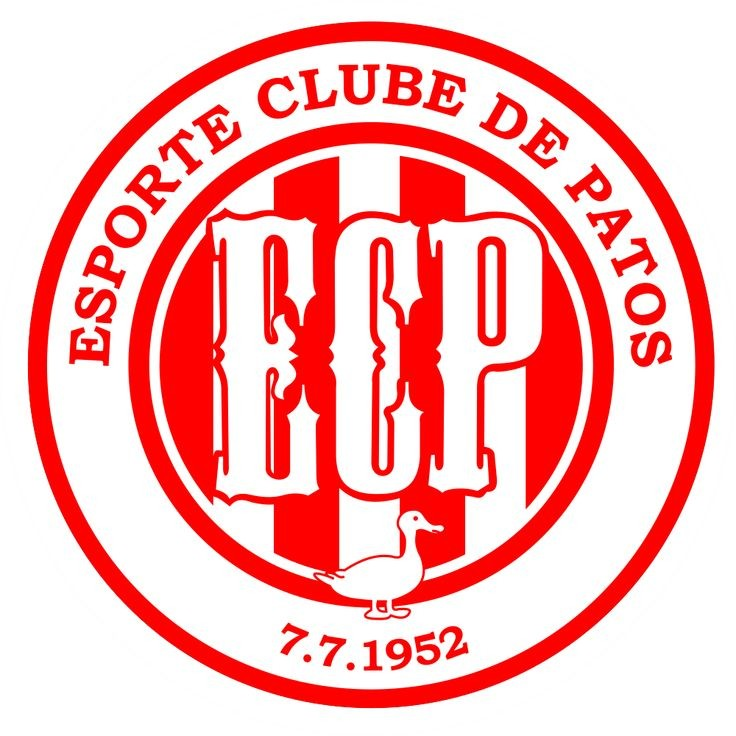
- Full name: Esporte Clube de Patos
- Nicknames: Alvirrubro; Terror do Sertão; Patinho do Sertão
- Founded: 7 July 1952; 73 years ago
- Ground: Estádio José Cavalcanti, Patos, Paraíba state, Brazil
- Capacity: 11,000
- President: Dário Leitão
- Head Coach: Marcos Nascimento
- League: Campeonato Paraibano
- 2024: Paraibano Segunda Divisão, 2nd of 10 (promoted)
- Website: https://esportedepatos.com.br/
Home colours	Away colours

Esporte Clube de Patos, commonly known as Esporte de Patos, or just as Esporte, is a Brazilian football club based in Patos, Paraíba state.

== History ==
The club was founded on July 7, 1952, by former athletes from the defunct local club Botafogo de Patos. The founders were fans of Pernambuco football, thus the club adopted a similar name to Sport Club do Recife, and adopted the same colors and team kits as Clube Náutico Capibaribe's. Esporte won the Campeonato Paraibano second division in 2005, 2013, 2015 and 2018.

== Honours ==
- Campeonato Paraibano Second Division
  - Winners (4): 2005, 2013, 2015, 2018
- Torneio Início da Paraíba
  - Winners (2): 1972, 1993

== Stadium ==
Esporte Clube de Patos play their home games at Estádio José Cavalcanti. The stadium has a maximum capacity of 11,000 people.
