= Solânea =

Coordinates: 6°45′S 35°39′W

- Municipality
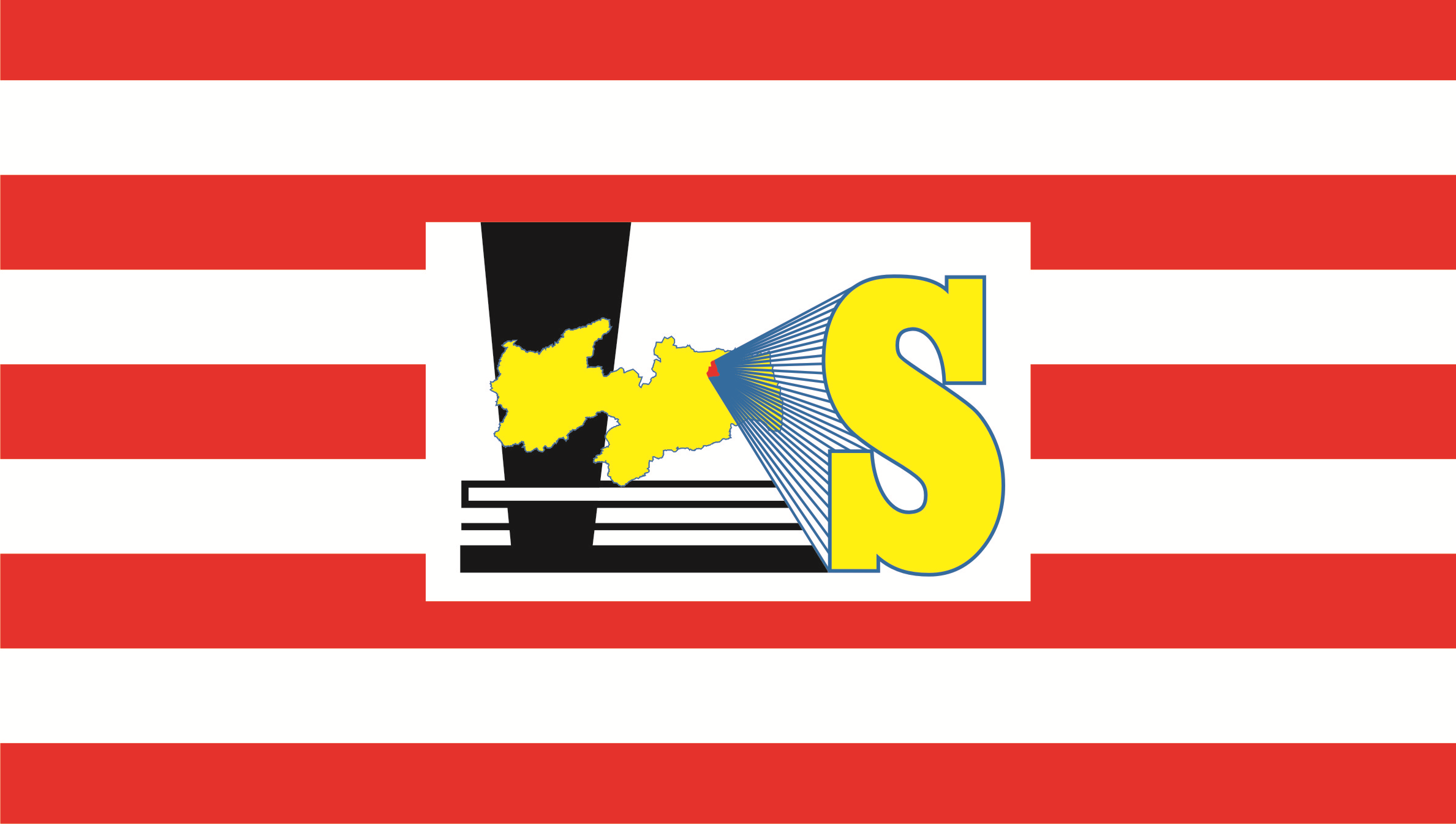
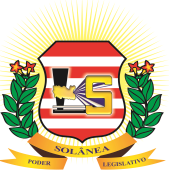
- Flag Coat of arms
- Interactive map of Solânea
- Country: Brazil
- Region: Northeast
- State: Paraíba
- Mesoregion: Agreste Paraibano

Population (2020)
  - Total: 26,227
- Time zone: UTC−3 (BRT)

Solânea (Central northeastern portuguese pronunciation: [sɔˈlɐ̃njɐ]) is a municipality in the state of Paraíba in the Northeast Region of Brazil.

== See also ==
- List of municipalities in Paraíba
