= Nacional Atlético Clube (Patos) =

Nacional de Patos
- Full name: Nacional Atlético Clube
- Nicknames: Naça; Verdão Maravilha (Wonder Green); Canário do Sertão (Canary from Sertão)
- Founded: 23 December 1961; 64 years ago
- Ground: José Cavalcanti
- Capacity: 8,000
- League: Campeonato Paraibano
- 2025: Paraibano, 8th of 10
Home colours	Away colours

Nacional Atlético Clube, usually known as Nacional de Patos or simply as Nacional is a Brazilian football club from Patos, Paraíba state. The club was founded in 1961, and in 1989 competed in the Brazilian Championship Second Level and in 2005 and in 2007 competed in the Brazilian Championship Third Level. Its home matches are played at José Cavalcanti Stadium.

== History ==
On 23 December 1961, the club was founded by employees of federal institutions, such as the Correios, and other institutions. The club's colors were originally green and yellow, but later the green and white were adopted as Nacional's official colors.

From 1977 to 1981, Nacional won the Torneio Incentivo, which was organized by the Brazilian Football Confederation, five times in a row.

In 1989, the club competed in the Brazilian Championship Second Level, but was eliminated in the first stage.

In 2005, Nacional competed in the Brazilian Championship Third Level, but was eliminated in the first stage of the competition.

In 2007, the club won the Paraíba State Championship for the first time. Nacional's Edmundo was the competition's top goalscorer, with 18 goals. In the same year, the club competed in the Brazilian Championship Third Level, reaching the final stage of the competition.

== Honours ==
- Campeonato Paraibano
  - Winners (1): 2007
- Copa Paraíba
  - Winners (1): 2008
- Campeonato Paraibano Second Division
  - Winners (1): 2017

== Current squad (selected) ==
Note: Flags indicate national team as defined under FIFA eligibility rules; some limited exceptions apply. Players may hold more than one non-FIFA nationality.

No.	Pos.	Nation	Player
—	DF	BRA	Júnior Sertânia ()

== Stadium ==
Nacional's home stadium is Estádio José Cavalcanti, with a maximum capacity of 8,000 people.

However, in 2007, the club played its Campeonato Brasileiro Série C final stage home matches at Amigão stadium, which has a maximum capacity of 40,000 people and is located in Campina Grande, because the minimum stadium capacity allowed during that stage of the competition was 10,000 people.
