= Associação Desportiva Guarabira =

Desportiva Guarabira
- Full name: Associação Desportiva Guarabira
- Nickname(s): Desportiva; Guarabira; Guará; Azulão do Brejo
- Founded: 2 May 2005; 19 years ago
- Ground: Estádio Municipal Sílvio Porto, Guarabira, Paraíba state, Brazil
- Capacity: 4,000
Home colours	Away colours

Associação Desportiva Guarabira, commonly known as Desportiva Guarabira, is a Brazilian football club based in Guarabira, Paraíba state.

== History ==
The club was founded on May 2, 2005, after Guarabira Esporte Clube folded. Desportiva Guarabira won the Campeonato Paraibano Second Level in 2009.

== Honours ==
- Campeonato Paraibano Second Division
  - Winners (1): 2009

== Stadium ==
Associação Desportiva Guarabira play their home games at Estádio Municipal Sílvio Porto. The stadium has a maximum capacity of 3,000 people.
