= Auto Esporte Clube (PB) =

Auto Esporte
- Full name: Auto Esporte Clube
- Nickname(s): O Clube do Povo
- Founded: September 7, 1936; 89 years ago
- Ground: Estádio Evandro Lélis
- Capacity: 2,000
- President: Watteu Rodrigues
- Head coach: Ramiro Souza
Home colors	Away colors

Auto Esporte Clube, also known as Auto Esporte, is a Brazilian football team from João Pessoa, Paraíba. They compete in the Série C once, in the Copa do Brasil twice, and won the Campeonato Paraibano several times.

== History ==
Auto Esporte Clube was founded on September 7, 1936, by taxi drivers from João Pessoa city. They won the Campeonato Paraibano in 1939, 1956, 1958, 1987, 1990, and in 1992. União was eliminated in the first stage in the Green module of the Copa João Havelange in 2000.

The club competed in the 1991, Copa do Brasil, when they were eliminated in the first stage by Grêmio of Rio Grande do Sul state. They competed in the Série C in 1992, reaching the second stage of the competition. Auto Esporte was again eliminated in the Copa do Brasil first round in 1993, when they were eliminated by Paysandu of Pará state.

== Stadium ==
The team play their home games at Estádio Evandro Lélis. The stadium has a maximum capacity of 2,000 people.

== Honours ==
=== State ===
- Campeonato Paraibano
  - Winners (6): 1939, 1956, 1958, 1987, 1990, 1992
  - Runners-up (8): 1948, 1949, 1953, 1954, 1955, 1957, 1959, 1993
- Copa Paraíba
  - Winners (1): 2011
- Campeonato Paraibano Second Division
  - Winners (3): 1968, 2006, 2024
- Torneio Início da Paraíba
  - Winners (11): 1941, 1948, 1950, 1952, 1953, 1954, 1955, 1957, 1958, 1959, 1990

=== Women's Football ===
- Campeonato Paraibano de Futebol Feminino
  - Winners (1): 2019
