= Guarabira =

- Municipality
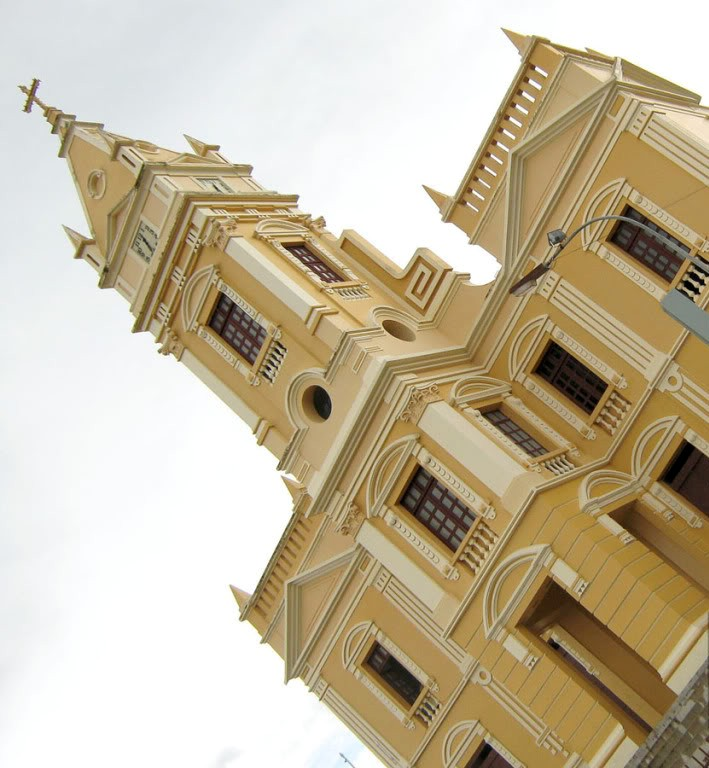

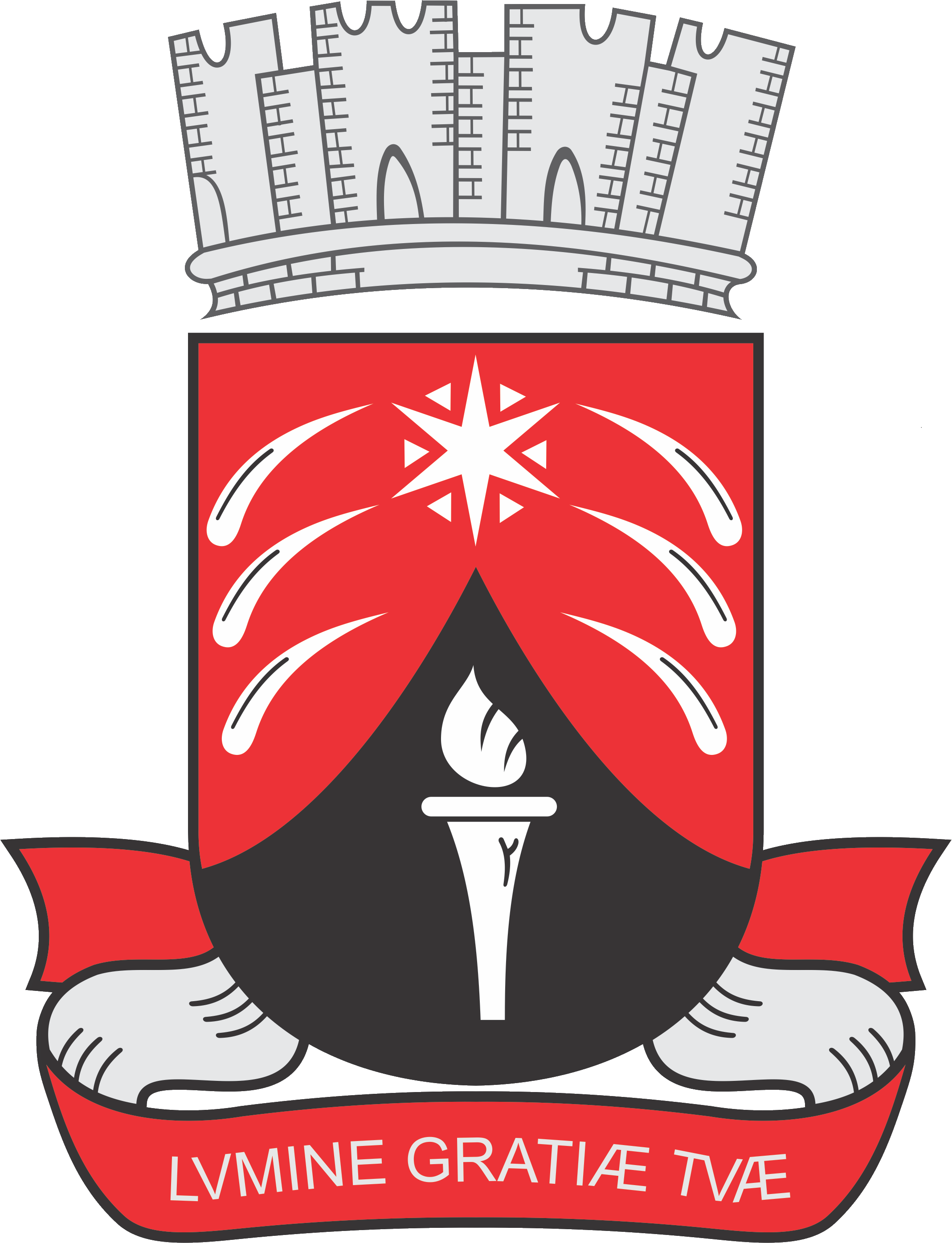
- Flag Coat of arms

- Country: Brazil
- Region: Northeast Region
- State: Paraíba
- Mesoregion: Agreste Paraibano

Government
  - Mayor: Marcus Diogo de Lima (PSDB)

Population (2020)
  - Total: 59,115
- Time zone: UTC−3 (BRT)
- Website: guarabira.pb.gov.br (in Portuguese)

Guarabira (Central northeastern portuguese pronunciation: [ɡ͡wɐɾɐˈbiɾɐ]) is a municipality in the state of Paraíba in the Northeast Region of Brazil. It is located at around 6°51′18″S 35°29′24″W. It was founded in 1837. It is the seat of the Roman Catholic Diocese of Guarabira.

== See also ==
- List of municipalities in Paraíba
