= Atlético Cajazeirense de Desportos =

Atlético Cajazeirense
- Full name: Atlético Cajazeirense de Desportos
- Nicknames: Trovão Azul do Sertão; Alviceleste
- Founded: July 3, 1948 (78 years ago)
- Ground: Perpetão, Cajazeiras, Paraíba state, Brazil
- Capacity: 4,500
- League: Campeonato Paraibano
- 2025: Paraibano Segunda Divisão, 2nd of 10 (promoted)
Home colors	Away colors

Atlético Cajazeirense de Desportos, commonly known as Atlético, is a Brazilian football club based in Cajazeiras, Paraíba state. They competed in the Série C once and in the Copa do Brasil twice.

Atlético is currently ranked fifth among Paraíba teams in CBF's national club ranking, at 170th place overall.

== History ==
The club was founded on July 21, 1948. Atlético won the Campeonato Paraibano in 2002. They competed in the Copa do Brasil in 2003, when they were eliminated in the First Round by Bahia, and in 2004, when they were eliminated in the First Round by Fortaleza. They competed in the Série C in 2007, when they were eliminated in the Second Stage of the competition.

== Honours ==
- Campeonato Paraibano
  - Winners (1): 2002
- Campeonato Paraibano Second Division
  - Winners (2): 2012, 2023

== Stadium ==
Atlético Cajazeirense de Desportos play their home games at Estádio Perpétuo Corrêa Lima, nicknamed Perpetão. The stadium has a maximum capacity of 4,500 people.
