= Centro Sportivo Paraibano =

CSP
- Full name: Centro Sportivo Paraibano
- Nickname(s): Tigre Praieiro; Tigre alviceleste
- Founded: 8 April 1996; 28 years ago
- Ground: Almeidão, João Pessoa, Paraíba state, Brazil
- Capacity: 40,000
- League: Campeonato Paraibano
- 2019: 8th
Home colours	Away colours

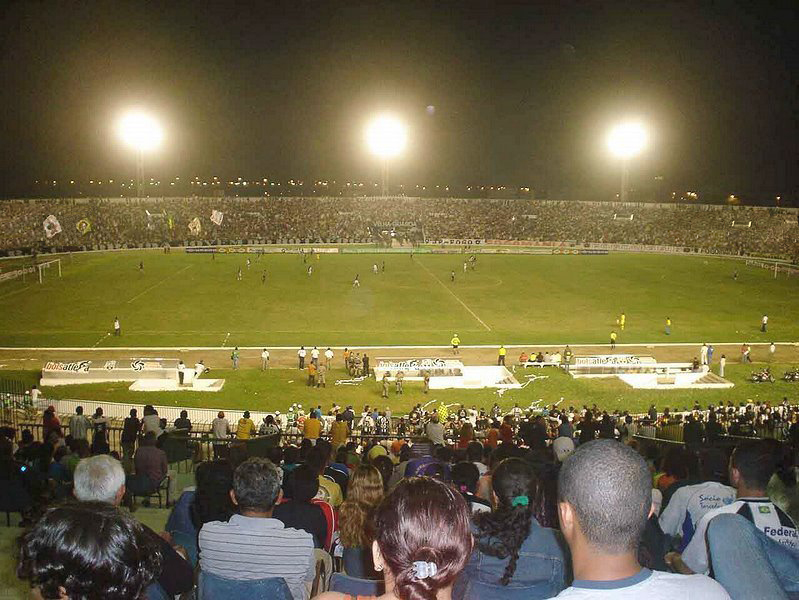
Estádio José Américo de Almeida Filho

Centro Sportivo Paraibano, commonly known as CSP, is a Brazilian football club based in João Pessoa, Paraíba state.

== History ==
The club was founded on April 8, 1996. CSP won the Campeonato Paraibano Second Level in 2010.

== Honours ==
=== State ===
- Campeonato Paraibano
  - Runners-up (1): 2011
- Copa Paraíba
  - Winners (1): 2012
- Campeonato Paraibano Second Division
  - Winners (2): 2010, 2021

== Stadium ==
Centro Sportivo Paraibano play their home games at Almeidão. The stadium has a maximum capacity of 40,000 people.
