= Campeonato Paraibano =

Football league in Paraíba, Brazil

- Organising body: FPF
- Founded: 1908; 118 years ago (as Liga Parahybana and later with different amateur leagues); 1960; 66 years ago (as the professional Campeonato Paraibano
- Country: Brazil
- State: Paraíba
- Level on pyramid: 1
- Relegation to: Campeonato Paraibano Second Division
- Domestic cup: Copa do Brasil
- Current champions: Botafogo (31st title) (2026)
- Most championships: Botafogo (31 titles)
- Website: FPF Official website
- Current: 2026 Campeonato Paraibano

The Campeonato Paraibano is the top-flight professional state football league in the Brazilian state of Paraíba. It is run by the Paraíba Football Federation (FPF).

== List of champions ==
Following is the list with all champions of Campeonato Paraibano.

=== Liga Parahybana de Football (amateur) ===
Season	Champions
1908	Parahyba FC (1)
1909	Parahyba United (1)
1910	Athletico Parahybano (1)
1911	Parahyba Sport (1)
1912	Red Cross (1)
1913	América (1)
1914	Brasil (1)
1915	Cabo Branco (1)
1916	Brasil (2)
1917	Colégio Pio X (1)
1918	Cabo Branco (2)

=== Federação Desportiva Parahybana (amateur) ===
Season	Champions
1919	Palmeiras (1)
1920	Cabo Branco (3)
1921	Palmeiras (2)
1922	Not held (Note: The Paraíba State league was inactive in 1922)
1923	América (2)
1924	Cabo Branco (4)
1925	América (3)
1926	Cabo Branco (5)
1927	Cabo Branco (6)
1928	Palmeiras (3)
1929	Cabo Branco (7)
1930	Not finished (Note: Due to the Revolution of 1930, the tournament was paralyzed and no team was declared champion)
1931	Cabo Branco (8)
1932	Cabo Branco (9)
1933	Palmeiras (4)
1934	Cabo Branco (10)
1935	Palmeiras (5)
1936	Botafogo (1)
1937	Botafogo (2)
1938	Botafogo (3)
1939	Auto Esporte (1)
1940	Treze (1)
1941	Treze (2)
1942	Ástrea (1)
1943	Ástrea (2)
1944	Botafogo (4)
1945	Botafogo (5)
1946	Felipéia (1)

=== Federação Paraibana de Futebol (amateur) ===
Season	Champions	Runners-up
1947	Botafogo (6)	Ipiranga
1948	Botafogo (7)	Auto Esporte
1949	Botafogo (8)	Auto Esporte
1950	Treze (3)	Botafogo
1951	Not held	
1952	Red Cross (2)	Botafogo
1953	Botafogo (9)	Auto Esporte
1954	Botafogo (10)	Auto Esporte
1955	Botafogo (11)	Auto Esporte
1956	Auto Esporte (2)	Botafogo
1957	Botafogo (12)	Auto Esporte
1958	Auto Esporte (3)	Estrela do Mar
1959	Estrela do Mar (1)	Auto Esporte

=== Federação Paraibana de Futebol (professional era) ===
Season	Champions	Runners-up
1960	Campinense (1)	Paulistano
1961	Campinense (2)	Treze
1962	Campinense (3)	Treze
1963	Campinense (4)	Treze
1964	Campinense (5)	Treze
1965	Campinense (6)	Botafogo
1966	Treze (4)	Campinense
1967	Campinense (7)	Treze
1968	Botafogo (13)	Treze
1969	Botafogo (14)	Treze
1970	Botafogo (15)	Santos
1971	Campinense (8)	Botafogo
1972	Campinense (9)	Treze
1973	Campinense (10)	Treze
1974	Campinense (11)	Treze
1975 (Note: In 1975, the tournament was set to be played in a triple round-robin stage format. However, at the end of the second round-robin stage, Auto Esporte judicially contested the referee of one of their matches. This caused a paralyzation of the championship, with the third round-robin stage not being realized and the FPF (Federação Paraibana de Futebol) declaring Botafogo (winner of first round-robin stage) and Treze (winner of the second round-robin stage) state champions of 1975.)	Botafogo (16)	Tie for champion
1975	Treze (5)	Tie for champion
1976	Botafogo (17)	Borborema
1977	Botafogo (18)	Campinense
1978	Botafogo (19)	Nacional
1979	Campinense (12)	Botafogo
1980	Campinense (13)	Botafogo
1981	Treze (6)	Campinense
1982	Treze (7)	Campinense
1983	Treze (8)	Campinense
1984	Botafogo (20)	Campinense
1985	Not awarded (Note: In 1985, accusations of irregular transfers and various interpretations of the tournament regulations caused Botafogo and Treze to judicially contest the title outside of sporting justice courts. The justice decided that the title should be shared by the two clubs, however FPF claimed to have no conditions of declaring any of the teams champions.)	
1986	Botafogo (21)	Treze
1987	Auto Esporte (4)	Botafogo
1988	Botafogo (22)	Treze
1989	Treze (9)	Botafogo
1990	Auto Esporte (5)	Nacional
1991	Campinense (14)	Nacional
1992	Auto Esporte (6)	Treze
1993	Campinense (15)	Auto Esporte
1994	Sousa (1)	Atlético Cajazeirense
1995	Santa Cruz (1)	Sousa
1996	Santa Cruz (2)	Botafogo
1997	Confiança (1)	Botafogo
1998	Botafogo (23)	Campinense
1999	Botafogo (24)	Treze
2000	Treze (10)	Botafogo
2001	Treze (11)	Botafogo
2002	Atlético Cajazeirense (1)	Botafogo
2003	Botafogo (25)	Atlético Cajazeirense
2004	Campinense (16)	Treze
2005	Treze (12)	Nacional
2006	Treze (13)	Botafogo
2007	Nacional (1)	Atlético Cajazeirense
2008	Campinense (17)	Treze
2009	Sousa (2)	Treze
2010	Treze (14)	Botafogo
2011	Treze (15)	CSP
2012	Campinense (18)	Sousa
2013	Botafogo (26)	Treze
2014	Botafogo (27)	Campinense
2015	Campinense (19)	Botafogo
2016	Campinense (20)	Botafogo
2017	Botafogo (28)	Treze
2018	Botafogo (29)	Campinense
2019	Botafogo (30)	Campinense
2020	Treze (16)	Campinense
2021	Campinense (21)	Sousa
2022	Campinense (22)	Botafogo
2023	Treze (17)	Sousa
2024	Sousa (3)	Botafogo
2025	Sousa (4)	Botafogo
2026	Botafogo (31)	Sousa

== Titles by team ==
Teams in bold stills active.

Rank	Club	Winners	Winning years
1	**Botafogo**	31	1936, 1937, 1938, 1944, 1945, 1947, 1948, 1949, 1953, 1954, 1955, 1957, 1968, 1969, 1970, 1975 (shared), 1976, 1977, 1978, 1984, 1986, 1988, 1998, 1999, 2003, 2013, 2014, 2017, 2018, 2019, 2026
2	**Campinense**	22	1960, 1961, 1962, 1963, 1964, 1965, 1967, 1971, 1972, 1973, 1974, 1979, 1980, 1991, 1993, 2004, 2008, 2012, 2015, 2016, 2021, 2022
3	**Treze**	17	1940, 1941, 1950, 1966, 1975 (shared), 1981, 1982, 1983, 1989, 2000, 2001, 2005, 2006, 2010, 2011, 2020, 2023
4	Cabo Branco	10	1915, 1918, 1920, 1924, 1926, 1927, 1929, 1931, 1932, 1934
5	**Auto Esporte**	6	1939, 1956, 1958, 1987, 1990, 1992
6	Palmeiras	5	1919, 1921, 1928, 1933, 1935
7	**Sousa**	4	1994, 2009, 2024, 2025
8	América	3	1913, 1923, 1925
9	Ástrea	2	1942, 1943
9	Brasil	2	1914, 1916
9	Red Cross	2	1912, 1952
9	**Santa Cruz**	2	1995, 1996
14	Athletico Parahybano	1	1910
14	**Atlético Cajazeirense**	1	2002
14	Colégio Pio X	1	1917
14	**Confiança**	1	1997
14	Estrela do Mar	1	1959
14	Felipéia	1	1946
14	**Nacional**	1	2007
14	Parahyba FC	1	1908
14	Parahyba Sport	1	1911
14	Parahyba United	1	1909

=== By city ===
City	Championships	Clubs
João Pessoa	67	Botafogo (31), Cabo Branco (10), Auto Esporte (6), Palmeiras (5), América (3), Ástrea (2), Brasil (2), Red Cross (2), Athletico Parahybano (1), Colégio Pio X (1), Estrela do Mar (1), Parahyba FC (1), Parahyba Sport (1), Parahyba United (1)
Campina Grande	39	Campinense (22), Treze (17)
Sousa	4	Sousa (4)
Santa Rita	2	Santa Cruz (2)
Bayeux	1	Felipéia (1)
Cajazeiras	1	Atlético Cajazeirense (1)
Patos	1	Nacional (1)
Sapé	1	Confiança (1)
