= Campinense Clube =

Brazilian association football club based in Paraíba

Campinense
- Full name: Campinense Clube
- Nicknames: Raposa (Fox); Raposa Feroz (Fierce Fox); Clube Cartola (Top Hat Club); Rubro-Negro Paraibano (Red and Black from Paraíba)
- Founded: 12 April 1915; 111 years ago
- Ground: Amigão
- Capacity: 35,000
- President: Phelipe Cordeiro
- League: Campeonato Paraibano
- 2025: Paraibano, 5th of 10
- Website: www.campinenseclube.net
Home colors	Away colors

Campinense Clube, commonly referred to as Campinense, is a Brazilian professional club based in Campina Grande, Paraíba founded on 12 April 1915. It competes in the Campeonato Brasileiro Série D, the fourth tier of Brazilian football, as well as in the Campeonato Paraibano, the top flight of the Paraíba state football league.

Campinense is currently ranked third among Paraíba teams in CBF's national club ranking, at 72nd place overall.

== History ==
The club was founded on 12 April 1915 as a dancing club by Elias Montenegro, Dino Belo, Antônio Lima and several others. The club's headquarters were located at Colégio Campinense. José Câmara was Campinense's first president.

In 1960, Campinense won its first state championship., which was the first of six consecutive championships won by the club. In 1961, the club competed in the Taça Brasil, finishing as the Northeastern Group runner-up after being defeated in the final by Bahia. In 1972, the club was defeated by Sampaio Corrêa in the Campeonato Brasileiro Série B final, finishing as the championship's runner-up. In 1975, Campinense competed in the Campeonato Brasileiro Série A for the first time, finishing in the competition's last position. The club competed again in that competition in 1978, 1979, and in 1981.

== Symbols ==
The club's mascot is a fox wearing a top hat.

== Stadium ==
Campinense's home stadium is Estádio Governador Ernani Sátiro, usually known as Amigão, inaugurated in 1975, with a maximum capacity of 40,000 people.

== Rivalries ==
The club has a fierce rivalry with city rivals Treze Futebol Clube.

== Honours ==
=== Official tournaments ===
Regional
Competitions	Titles	Seasons
Copa do Nordeste	1	2013
Inter-state
Competitions	Titles	Seasons
Copa Rio Grande do Norte - Paraíba	1	1962
Taça Governador Guilherme Palmeira	1	1981
City
Competitions	Titles	Seasons
Taça Cidade de Campina Grande	3	1967, 1985, 1996
State
Competitions	Titles	Seasons
Campeonato Paraibano	22	1960, 1961, 1962, 1963, 1964, 1965, 1967, 1971, 1972, 1973, 1974, 1979, 1980, 1991, 1993, 2004, 2008, 2012, 2015, 2016, 2021, 2022
Copa Paraíba	2	1973, 2006

=== Others tournaments ===
==== State ====
- Torneio Início da Paraíba (6): 1964, 1966, 1973, 1975, 1977, 1980

=== Runners-up ===
- Campeonato Brasileiro Série B (1): 1972
- Campeonato Brasileiro Série D (1): 2021
- Copa do Nordeste (1): 2016
- Campeonato Paraibano (11): 1966, 1977, 1981, 1982, 1983, 1984, 1998, 2014, 2018, 2019, 2020
