= Sousa Esporte Clube =

Sousa
- Full name: Sousa Esporte Clube
- Nickname: Dinossauro Verde do Sertão (Green Dinosaur of the Hinterland)
- Founded: 10 July 1991; 35 years ago
- Ground: Marizão
- Capacity: 13.000
- Head Coach: Thardelli Abrantes
- League: Campeonato Brasileiro Série D Campeonato Paraibano
- 2025 2025: Série D, 55th of 64; Paraibano, 1st of 10 (champions)
- Website: www.sousaesporteclube.com.br
Home colours	Away colours

Sousa Esporte Clube, commonly known as Sousa, is a Brazilian football team based in Sousa, Paraíba state. They competed in the Série C and in the Copa do Brasil three times.

Sousa is currently ranked fourth among Paraíba teams in CBF's national club ranking, at 143rd place overall.

== History ==
The club was founded on 10 July 1991. Sousa won the Campeonato Paraibano Second Level in 1991, and the Campeonato Paraibano in 1994, 2009 and in 2024. They competed in the Série C in 1994, when they eliminated in the Second Stage by CSA. Sousa competed in the Copa do Brasil for the first time in 1995, when they were eliminated in the preliminary round by Flamengo. They competed in the Série C in 1995, when they were eliminated in the Third Stage by Icasa. The club was eliminated in Third Stage by Sergipe in the 2003 Série C. Sousa competed again in the Copa do Brasil in 2008, when they were eliminated in the first round by Vitória. The club competed in the Copa do Brasil in 2010, when they were eliminated in the first round by Vasco.

Sousa also competed in the 2024 Copa do Brasil, when they made a historical campaign: In the first round, verdão knocked out Cruzeiro with a 2-0 win, for the first time making it to the second round. Then, Sousa beat Petrolina Social Clube 1-0 and went to the third round. Against Red Bull Bragantino, dino was defeated 4-1 on the aggregate, after a 1-1 tie on the first leg and 3-0 loss on the second leg.

== Honours ==
- Campeonato Paraibano
  - Winners (4): 1994, 2009, 2024, 2025
  - Runners-up (5): 1995, 2012, 2021, 2023, 2026
- Campeonato Paraibano Second Division
  - Winners (1): 1991
- Torneio Início da Paraíba
  - Winners (1): 1994

== Stadium ==
Sousa Esporte Clube play their home games at Estádio Governador Antônio Mariz, nicknamed Marizão. The stadium has a maximum capacity of 10,000 people.
