= Patos, Brazil =

Patos
- Municipality
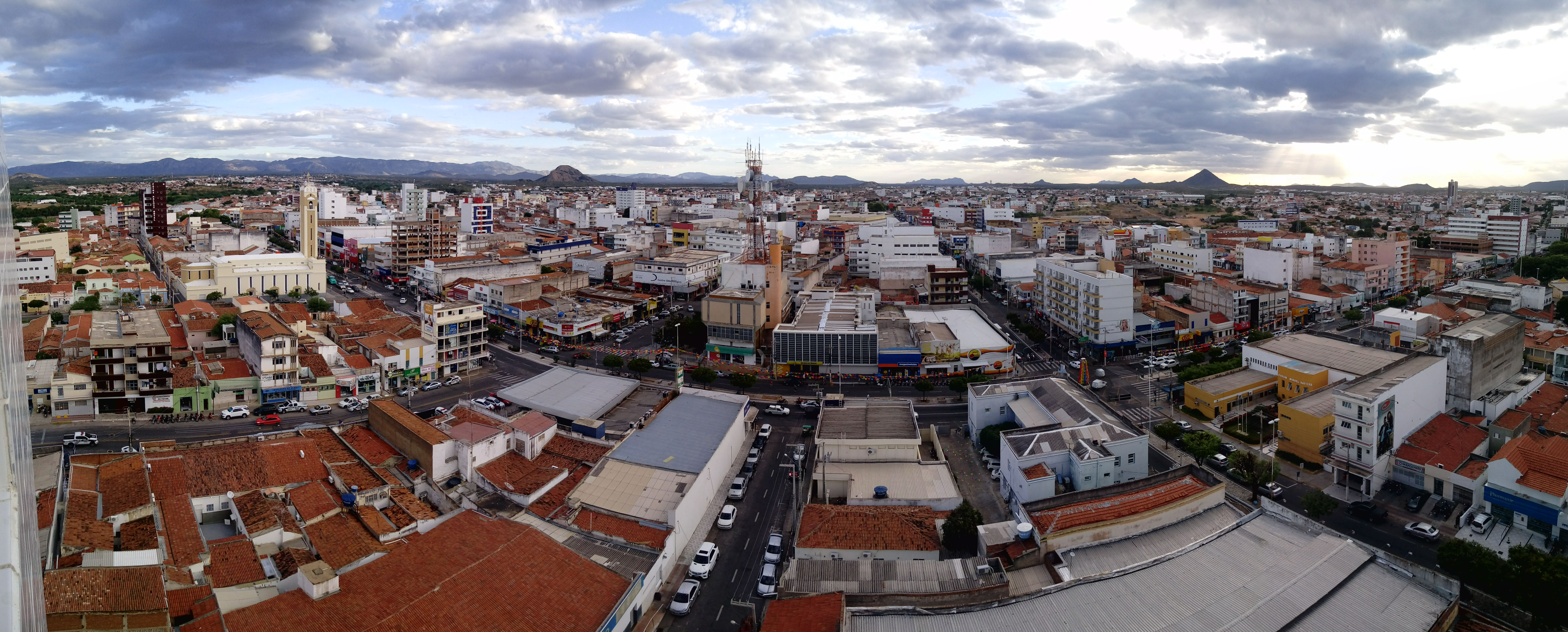
- Panorama view of the city of Patos, state of Paraíba, Brazil

- Flag Coat of arms
- Motto: "Sun's residence"
- Location of Patos in Paraíba

- Location of Patos in Brazil
- Coordinates: 7°01′28″S 37°16′48″W
- Country: Brazil
- Region: Northeast
- State: Paraíba
- Mesoregion: Sertão Paraibano

Government
  - Mayor: Nabor Wanderley da Nóbrega Filho[6] (Republicanos, 2021 – 2024)

Area
  - Total: 513 km^{2} (198 sq mi)
- Elevation: 242 m (794 ft)

Population (2022 Census)
  - Total: 103,165
  - Estimate (2025): 108,104
- Time zone: UTC−3 (BRT)
- Postal code: 58.700-000
- Website: www.patos.pb.gov.br (in Portuguese)

Patos is a municipality of the state of Paraíba in the Northeast Region of Brazil. It is classified by the Brazilian Institute of Geography and Statistics as a sub-regional center A.

It is located in the Espinharas River valley, surrounded by the Borborema Plateau to east and south, and by the pediplain Sertanejo to the west. It originated from the village of Patos, spun off from the Parish of Nossa Senhora do Bom Sucesso de Pombal on October 6, 1788.

The city is 306 km from the city of João Pessoa, the center of its immediate and intermediate geographic regions. It stands out as an educational, commercial, banking, religious and health center, both in the back country of Paraíba, and in areas of Pernambuco and Rio Grande do Norte. It is the third most important municipality in the state considering the economic, political and social aspects (behind João Pessoa and Campina Grande). According to IBGE estimates for 2021, it is the fourth most populous municipality in the state with 108,766 inhabitants.

Esporte and Nacional are the city's two football (soccer) clubs. They play at the José Cavalcanti Municipal Stadium. There are four multisport arenas: Rivaldão, AABB, SESC and SESI.

The city is served by Brig. Firmino Ayres Airport.

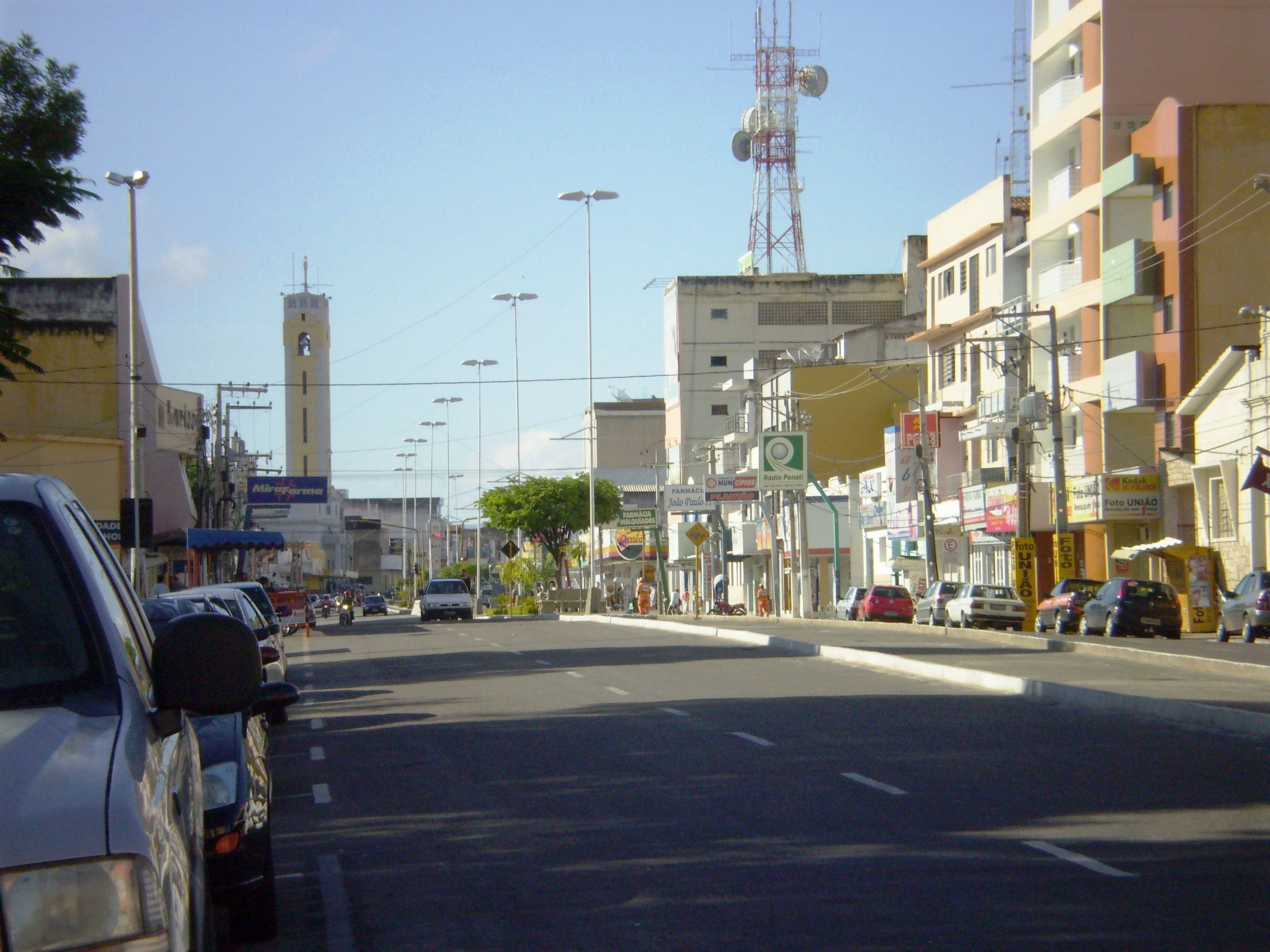
Patos, Brazil

== Climate ==
The city of Patos experiences a tropical hot semi-arid climate (Köppen: BSh), just short of a tropical savanna climate, with a short rainy season from February to April. During this period, when the equatorial rainband associated with the highly seasonalized positioning of the Intertropical Convergence Zone is over the city, warm to hot temperatures and abundant equatorial rainfall prevail. Conversely, the dry season dominates the remaining majority of the year, with abundant sunshine prevalent from May to January. The wettest month is March, with an average monthly precipitation of 213 mm (8.38 in), while the driest month is September, with an average precipitation of only 1 mm (0.04 in).

Climate data for Patos (1981–2010)
Month	Jan	Feb	Mar	Apr	May	Jun	Jul	Aug	Sep	Oct	Nov	Dec	Year
Record high °C (°F)	39.1 (102.4)	38.9 (102.0)	39.6 (103.3)	38.5 (101.3)	38.0 (100.4)	37.0 (98.6)	36.5 (97.7)	38.6 (101.5)	38.5 (101.3)	39.8 (103.6)	39.5 (103.1)	39.5 (103.1)	39.8 (103.6)
Mean daily maximum °C (°F)	34.9 (94.8)	34.3 (93.7)	33.6 (92.5)	33.1 (91.6)	32.7 (90.9)	32.1 (89.8)	32.3 (90.1)	33.2 (91.8)	34.8 (94.6)	35.9 (96.6)	36.2 (97.2)	36.0 (96.8)	34.1 (93.4)
Daily mean °C (°F)	28.5 (83.3)	27.9 (82.2)	27.4 (81.3)	27.2 (81.0)	26.9 (80.4)	26.2 (79.2)	26.0 (78.8)	26.5 (79.7)	27.5 (81.5)	28.5 (83.3)	29.1 (84.4)	29.2 (84.6)	27.6 (81.7)
Mean daily minimum °C (°F)	22.9 (73.2)	22.7 (72.9)	22.4 (72.3)	22.4 (72.3)	22.0 (71.6)	21.3 (70.3)	20.6 (69.1)	20.6 (69.1)	21.3 (70.3)	22.0 (71.6)	22.6 (72.7)	23.0 (73.4)	22.0 (71.6)
Record low °C (°F)	18.5 (65.3)	20.0 (68.0)	19.9 (67.8)	19.5 (67.1)	17.8 (64.0)	16.2 (61.2)	15.7 (60.3)	16.1 (61.0)	18.0 (64.4)	19.1 (66.4)	20.0 (68.0)	18.7 (65.7)	15.7 (60.3)
Average precipitation mm (inches)	115.7 (4.56)	127.5 (5.02)	209.5 (8.25)	127.4 (5.02)	81.6 (3.21)	28.7 (1.13)	9.8 (0.39)	7.8 (0.31)	1.3 (0.05)	7.2 (0.28)	7.1 (0.28)	40.8 (1.61)	764.4 (30.09)
Average precipitation days (≥ 1.0 mm)	7	8	13	9	6	3	2	1	0	1	1	2	53
Average relative humidity (%)	58.5	63.0	68.7	70.1	65.3	61.7	57.7	53.9	49.6	48.2	48.8	51.3	58.1
Mean monthly sunshine hours	260.6	225.7	257.7	251.1	244.3	223.5	238.9	271.4	290.7	306.1	293.7	286.0	3,149.7
Source: Instituto Nacional de Meteorologia (temperature records: 1975 to 1984 and 1993 to 2013)

== See also ==
- List of municipalities in Paraíba
