= 2024 Campeonato Paraibano =

114th edition of Paraíba's football league

Campeonato Paraibano de Futebol
- Season: 2024
- Dates: 17 January 2024 to 7 April 2024
- Champions: Sousa
- Relegated: Atlético-PB; São Paulo Crystal
- Matches: 34
- Goals: 75 (2.21 per match)
- Top goalscorer: Eduardo, Campinense
- Biggest home win: Botafogo-PB 5–1 São Paulo Crystal; Round 1, 18 January
- Biggest away win: São Paulo Crystal 0–3 CSP; Round 7, 1 March
- Highest scoring: Botafogo-PB 5–1 São Paulo Crystal; Round 1, 18 January
- Longest winning run: 4 (Treze)
- Longest unbeaten run: 6 (Botafogo-PB)
- Longest losing run: 3 (São Paulo Crystal; Pombal)
- All statistics correct as of 16:12, 6 March 2024 (UTC).

The 2024 Campeonato Paraibano de Futebol is the 114th edition of Paraíba's top professional football league. The competition started on 17 January 2024 and is scheduled to finish on 7 April 2024.

== Format ==
The format of the competition remains unchanged from the 2023 season, and consists of a group stage where each of the ten teams face each other once. The top four proceed to a knockout semi-final and final, each over two legs. The bottom two teams in the group stage will be relegated to the second division.

The semi-final is drawn according to finishing places in the group stage. First played fourth and second played third, with the higher placed team at home in the second legs. The best performing team in the semi-finals will be at home in the second leg of the final.

=== Qualification ===
The two finalists will qualify to participate in the 2025 Copa do Brasil, unless they obtain qualification via other means, in which case the place will pass to the third-placed team. The champion will qualify to participate in the 2025 Copa do Nordeste. The two best placed teams (other than those already participating in a national league) will qualify to participate in the 2025 Campeonato Brasileiro Série D.

== Participating teams ==
Club	Home City	Head coach	2023 Result
Atlético Cajazeirense de Desportos (Atlético-PB)	Cajazeiras	Éderson Araújo	1st (Second division)
Botafogo Futebol Clube (Botafogo-PB)	João Pessoa	Moacir Júnior	4th
Campinense Clube	Campina Grande	Francisco Diá	6th
Centro Sportivo Paraibano (CSP)	João Pessoa	Josivaldo Alves	7th
Nacional Atlético Clube (Nacional de Patos)	Patos	Michel Lima	5th
Pombal Esporte Clube	Pombal	Adriano Souza	2nd (Second division)
São Paulo Crystal Futebol Clube	Cruz do Espírito Santo	Giovani Montinni	3rd
Serra Branca Esporte Clube	Serra Branca	Ranielle Ribeiro	8th
Sousa Esporte Clube	Sousa	Paulo Schardong	2nd
Treze Futebol Clube	Campina Grande	Dema	1st

== Group phase ==
Pos	Team	Pld	W	D	L	GF	GA	GD	Pts	Qualification
1	Treze	9	7	0	2	18	6	+12	21	Advance to semi-final stage
2	Serra Branca	9	5	2	2	13	6	+7	17	Advance to semi-final stage
3	Botafogo-PB	9	5	2	2	13	9	+4	17	Advance to semi-final stage
4	Sousa	9	4	2	3	11	6	+5	14	Advance to semi-final stage
5	CSP	9	4	1	4	10	9	+1	13	
6	Campinense	9	3	2	4	6	10	−4	11	
7	Nacional de Patos	9	3	1	5	7	10	−3	10	
8	Pombal	9	3	1	5	10	14	−4	10	
9	São Paulo Crystal	9	1	1	7	4	22	−18	4	Relegated to Second Division
10	Atlético-PB (Note: On 23 February, the TJDF-PB (Paraíba Football Sports Court of Justice) announced that Atlético-PB were deducted 13 points for fielding a suspended player in three fixtures. The decision is subject to an appeal, to be heard on 8 March.)	9	3	2	4	8	8	0	−2	Relegated to Second Division

Rules for classification: 1) points; 2) wins; 3) goal difference; 4) number of goals scored; 5) least red cards; 6) least yellow cards.
