= 2022 Campeonato Brasileiro Série D =

2022 Brazilian soccer competition

Campeonato Brasileiro Série D
- Season: 2022
- Dates: 17 April – 25 September
- Champions: América de Natal (1st title)
- Promoted: Amazonas; América de Natal; Pouso Alegre; São Bernardo
- Matches played: 510
- Goals scored: 1,154 (2.26 per match)
- Top goalscorer: Ítalo; Rafael Tavares (11 goals each)
- Biggest home win: Ferroviária 8–0 URT; Group A6, R1, 17 April; Trem 10–2 Náutico; Group A1, R8, 6 June; Porto Velho 8–0 Náutico; Group A1, R14, 16 July
- Biggest away win: Náutico 0–6 Amazonas; Group A1, R13, 9 July
- Highest scoring: 12 goals Trem 10–2 Náutico; Group A1, R8, 6 June
- Highest attendance: 38,305; Santa Cruz 0–0 Tocantinópolis; Round of 16, 1st leg, 7 August
- Lowest attendance: 0 Crato 1–5 Retrô; Group A3, R14, 16 July
- Total attendance: 718,348
- Average attendance: 1,409

The 2022 Campeonato Brasileiro Série D was a football competition held in Brazil, equivalent to the fourth division. The competition began on 17 April and ended on 25 September 2022.

Sixty-four teams competed in the tournament. Sixty teams qualified from their state leagues and cups, and four relegated from the 2021 Campeonato Brasileiro Série C (Jacuipense, Oeste, Paraná and Santa Cruz).

The four semi-finalists, Amazonas, América de Natal, Pouso Alegre and São Bernardo, were promoted to the 2023 Campeonato Brasileiro Série C.

In the finals, América de Natal won their first title after defeating Pouso Alegre 2–1 on aggregate.

== Teams ==
Location of teams in 2022 Série D

=== Federation ranking ===
The number of teams from each state was chosen based on the CBF State Ranking.

Rank	Federation	Coeff.	Teams	Notes
1	(São Paulo (state)) São Paulo	83,474	4	+1 (C)
2	(Rio de Janeiro (state)) Rio de Janeiro	50,473	3	
3	Rio Grande do Sul	44,106	3	
4	Minas Gerais	40,274	3	
5	(Paraná (state)) Paraná	34,359	3	+1 (C)
6	(Santa Catarina (state)) Santa Catarina	27,581	3	
7	Ceará	25,595	3	
8	Goiás	22,900	3	
9	Bahia	21,529	3	+1 (C)
10	Pernambuco	16,738	2	+1 (C)
11	Alagoas	12,762	2	
12	Mato Grosso	10,891	2	
13	Pará	8,967	2	
14	Maranhão	7,809	2	
15	Rio Grande do Norte	5,787	2	
16	Paraíba	5,456	2	
17	Sergipe	5,036	2	
18	(Amazonas (Brazilian state)) Amazonas	3,460	2	
19	Piauí	3,259	2	
20	(Acre (state)) Acre	2,978	2	
21	(Federal District (Brazil)) Distrito Federal	2,690	2	
22	Espírito Santo	2,168	2	
23	Roraima	1,833	2	
24	Tocantins	1,685	1	
25	Mato Grosso do Sul	1,656	1	
26	Rondônia	1,600	1	
27	Amapá	1,448	1	

=== Participating teams ===
Federation	Team	Home city	Qualification method
(Acre (state)) Acre	Rio Branco	Rio Branco	2021 Campeonato Acreano champions
(Acre (state)) Acre	Humaitá	Porto Acre	2021 Campeonato Acreano runners-up
Alagoas	CSE	Palmeira dos Índios	2021 Campeonato Alagoano 3rd place
Alagoas	ASA	Arapiraca	2021 Copa Alagoas champions
Amapá	Trem	Macapá	2021 Campeonato Amapaense champions
(Amazonas (Brazilian state)) Amazonas	São Raimundo-AM	Manaus	2021 Campeonato Amazonense runners-up
(Amazonas (Brazilian state)) Amazonas	Amazonas	Manaus	2021 Campeonato Amazonense 3rd place
Bahia	Atlético de Alagoinhas	Alagoinhas	2021 Campeonato Baiano champions
Bahia	Bahia de Feira	Feira de Santana	2021 Campeonato Baiano runners-up
Bahia	Juazeirense	Juazeiro	2021 Campeonato Baiano 3rd place
Bahia	Jacuipense	Riachão do Jacuípe	2021 Série C Group A 9th place
Ceará	Pacajus	Pacajus	2021 Campeonato Cearense 5th place
Ceará	Crato	Crato	2021 Campeonato Cearense 6th place
Ceará	Icasa	Juazeiro do Norte	2021 Campeonato Cearense 7th place
Espírito Santo	Real Noroeste	Águia Branca	2021 Campeonato Capixaba champions
Espírito Santo	Nova Venécia	Nova Venécia	2021 Copa Espírito Santo champions
(Federal District (Brazil)) Federal District	Brasiliense	Taguatinga	2021 Campeonato Brasiliense champions
(Federal District (Brazil)) Federal District	Ceilândia	Ceilândia	2021 Campeonato Brasiliense runners-up
Goiás	Grêmio Anápolis	Anápolis	2021 Campeonato Goiano champions
Goiás	Anápolis	Anápolis	2021 Campeonato Goiano 5th place
Goiás	Iporá	Iporá	2021 Campeonato Goiano 6th place
Maranhão	Moto Club	São Luís	2021 Campeonato Maranhense runners-up
Maranhão	Juventude Samas	São Mateus do Maranhão	2021 Copa Federação Maranhense de Futebol runners-up
Mato Grosso	CEOV	Várzea Grande	2021 Campeonato Mato-Grossense runners-up
Mato Grosso	Ação	Santo Antônio de Leverger	2021 Campeonato Mato-Grossense 3rd place
Mato Grosso do Sul	Costa Rica	Costa Rica	2021 Campeonato Sul-Mato-Grossense champions
Minas Gerais	Pouso Alegre	Pouso Alegre	2021 Campeonato Mineiro 5th place
Minas Gerais	URT	Patos de Minas	2021 Campeonato Mineiro 6th place
Minas Gerais	Caldense	Poços de Caldas	2021 Campeonato Mineiro 7th place
Pará	Tuna Luso	Belém	2021 Campeonato Paraense runners-up
Pará	Castanhal	Castanhal	2021 Campeonato Paraense 4th place
Paraíba	Sousa	Sousa	2021 Campeonato Paraibano runners-up
Paraíba	São Paulo Crystal	Lucena	2021 Campeonato Paraibano 4th place
(Paraná (state)) Paraná	FC Cascavel	Cascavel	2021 Campeonato Paranaense runners-up
(Paraná (state)) Paraná	Azuriz	Marmeleiro	2021 Campeonato Paranaense 5th place
(Paraná (state)) Paraná	Cianorte	Cianorte	2021 Campeonato Paranaense 6th place
(Paraná (state)) Paraná	Paraná	Curitiba	2021 Série C Group B 9th place
Pernambuco	Afogados	Afogados da Ingazeira	2021 Campeonato Pernambucano first stage 5th place
Pernambuco	Retrô^{[a]}	Camaragibe	2021 Campeonato Pernambucano first stage 7th place
Pernambuco	Santa Cruz	Recife	2021 Série C Group A 10th place
Piauí	Fluminense	Teresina	2021 Campeonato Piauiense runners-up
Piauí	4 de Julho	Piripiri	2021 Campeonato Piauiense 3rd place
(Rio de Janeiro (state)) Rio de Janeiro	Portuguesa	Rio de Janeiro	2021 Campeonato Carioca 3rd place
(Rio de Janeiro (state)) Rio de Janeiro	Nova Iguaçu	Nova Iguaçu	2021 Campeonato Carioca 7th place
(Rio de Janeiro (state)) Rio de Janeiro	Pérolas Negras	Resende	2021 Copa Rio champions
Rio Grande do Norte	Globo	Ceará-Mirim	2021 Campeonato Potiguar champions
Rio Grande do Norte	América de Natal	Natal	2021 Campeonato Potiguar 3rd place
Rio Grande do Sul	Caxias	Caxias do Sul	2021 Campeonato Gaúcho 4th place
Rio Grande do Sul	Aimoré	São Leopoldo	2021 Campeonato Gaúcho 7th place
Rio Grande do Sul	São Luiz	Ijuí	2021 Campeonato Gaúcho 8th place
Rondônia	Porto Velho	Porto Velho	2021 Campeonato Rondoniense champions
Roraima	São Raimundo-RR	Boa Vista	2021 Campeonato Roraimense champions
Roraima	Náutico	Boa Vista	2021 Campeonato Roraimense runners-up
(Santa Catarina (state)) Santa Catarina	Marcílio Dias	Itajaí	2021 Campeonato Catarinense 4th place
(Santa Catarina (state)) Santa Catarina	Juventus	Jaraguá do Sul	2021 Campeonato Catarinense 5th place
(Santa Catarina (state)) Santa Catarina	Próspera	Criciúma	2021 Campeonato Catarinense 6th place
(São Paulo (state)) São Paulo	Ferroviária	Araraquara	2021 Campeonato Paulista 6th place
(São Paulo (state)) São Paulo	Inter de Limeira	Limeira	2021 Campeonato Paulista 7th place
(São Paulo (state)) São Paulo	Santo André	Santo André	2021 Campeonato Paulista 13th place
(São Paulo (state)) São Paulo	São Bernardo	São Bernardo do Campo	2021 Copa Paulista champions
(São Paulo (state)) São Paulo	Oeste	Barueri	2021 Série C Group B 10th place
Sergipe	Sergipe	Aracaju	2021 Campeonato Sergipano champions
Sergipe	Lagarto	Lagarto	2021 Campeonato Sergipano runners-up
Tocantins	Tocantinópolis	Tocantinópolis	2021 Campeonato Tocantinense champions

^{a} Salgueiro and Vera Cruz (2021 Campeonato Pernambucano first stage 3rd place and 6th place, respectively) declined to participate in the Série D. They were replaced by the 7th place Retrô.

== Competition format ==
In the group stage, the 64 teams were divided into eight groups of eight organized regionally. Top four teams qualified for the round of 32. From the round of 32 on the competition was played as a knock-out tournament with each round contested over two legs.

== Group stage ==
In the group stage, each group was played on a home-and-away round-robin basis. The teams were ranked according to points (3 points for a win, 1 point for a draw, and 0 points for a loss). If tied on points, the following criteria would be used to determine the ranking: 1. Wins; 2. Goal difference; 3. Goals scored; 4. Head-to-head (if the tie was only between two teams); 5. Fewest red cards; 6. Fewest yellow cards; 7. Draw in the headquarters of the Brazilian Football Confederation (Regulations Article 13).

The top four teams qualified for the round of 32.

=== Group A1 ===
Pos	Team	Pld	W	D	L	GF	GA	GD	Pts	Qualification	AMA	RIO	SRA	SRR	POR	TRE	HUM	NAU
1	(Amazonas (Brazilian state)) Amazonas	14	9	4	1	37	12	+25	31	Advance to round of 32		3–1	2–2	1–1	1–2	4–1	6–0	3–0
2	(Acre (state)) Rio Branco	14	8	3	3	24	11	+13	27	Advance to round of 32	2–2		1–0	0–0	1–0	3–0	2–0	5–0
3	(Amazonas (Brazilian state)) São Raimundo-AM	14	6	6	2	19	11	+8	24	Advance to round of 32	1–1	1–0		2–1	0–1	3–1	0–0	5–1
4	(Roraima) São Raimundo-RR	14	6	5	3	21	14	+7	23	Advance to round of 32	1–2	1–0	1–1		2–2	2–1	5–0	2–1
5	(Rondônia) Porto Velho	14	6	3	5	28	20	+8	21		1–3	0–1	1–1	0–1		1–4	3–2	8–0
6	(Amapá) Trem	14	4	4	6	29	27	+2	16		0–2	2–2	0–0	1–2	2–2		2–1	10–2
7	(Acre (state)) Humaitá	14	1	3	10	11	32	−21	6		0–1	1–2	0–1	2–1	2–4	0–0		1–1
8	(Roraima) Náutico	14	1	2	11	15	57	−42	5		0–6	1–4	1–2	1–1	0–3	3–5	4–2	

Source: CBF
Rules for classification: 1) points; 2) wins; 3) goal difference; 4) goals scored; 5) head-to-head results (only between 2 teams); 6) fewest red cards; 7) fewest yellow cards; 8) draw.

=== Group A2 ===
Pos	Team	Pld	W	D	L	GF	GA	GD	Pts	Qualification	MOT	TOC	PAC	JUV	FLU	CAS	TUN	4DE
1	(Maranhão) Moto Club	14	9	1	4	24	14	+10	28	Advance to round of 32		1–2	1–1	3–0	3–2	2–0	2–0	3–0
2	(Tocantins) Tocantinópolis	14	6	4	4	23	21	+2	22	Advance to round of 32	2–0		1–1	0–1	2–1	4–1	3–1	0–0
3	(Ceará) Pacajus	14	5	5	4	15	13	+2	20	Advance to round of 32	0–2	2–3		0–1	0–0	1–0	2–0	3–1
4	(Maranhão) Juventude Samas	14	5	5	4	14	14	0	20	Advance to round of 32	0–1	0–0	0–1		2–4	1–0	2–2	0–0
5	(Piauí) Fluminense	14	4	5	5	23	19	+4	17		2–3	4–0	1–2	1–2		3–1	0–0	0–0
6	(Pará) Castanhal	14	4	5	5	16	15	+1	17		3–0	2–1	1–1	0–0	2–2		0–0	0–0
7	(Pará) Tuna Luso	14	3	4	7	12	25	−13	13		0–2	5–3	1–0	0–3	1–1	0–3		2–1
8	(Piauí) 4 de Julho	14	2	7	5	13	19	−6	13		2–1	2–2	1–1	2–2	1–2	0–3	3–0	

Source: CBF
Rules for classification: 1) points; 2) wins; 3) goal difference; 4) goals scored; 5) head-to-head results (only between 2 teams); 6) fewest red cards; 7) fewest yellow cards; 8) draw.

=== Group A3 ===
Pos	Team	Pld	W	D	L	GF	GA	GD	Pts	Qualification	RET	AME	SOU	AFO	ICA	SAO	GLO	CRA
1	(Pernambuco) Retrô	14	10	3	1	27	6	+21	33	Advance to round of 32		1–0	1–0	1–1	3–0	3–0	1–0	2–0
2	(Rio Grande do Norte) América de Natal	14	6	6	2	20	7	+13	24	Advance to round of 32	0–0		2–1	0–1	3–0	0–0	1–0	8–1
3	(Paraíba) Sousa	14	7	2	5	18	17	+1	23	Advance to round of 32	0–3	1–2		3–2	1–2	1–0	2–1	2–0
4	(Pernambuco) Afogados	14	6	4	4	23	12	+11	22	Advance to round of 32	1–1	0–0	0–1		1–0	7–0	1–1	2–0
5	(Ceará) Icasa	14	6	4	4	16	18	−2	22		1–0	1–1	2–2	2–5		1–0	1–0	3–0
6	(Paraíba) São Paulo Crystal	14	3	4	7	13	26	−13	13		1–4	1–1	2–3	1–0	1–1		2–3	2–0
7	(Rio Grande do Norte) Globo	14	3	3	8	14	17	−3	12		1–2	0–2	0–0	2–0	1–1	1–2		3–0
8	(Ceará) Crato	14	1	2	11	5	33	−28	5		1–5	0–0	0–1	0–2	0–1	1–1	2–1	

Source: CBF
Rules for classification: 1) points; 2) wins; 3) goal difference; 4) goals scored; 5) head-to-head results (only between 2 teams); 6) fewest red cards; 7) fewest yellow cards; 8) draw.

=== Group A4 ===
Pos	Team	Pld	W	D	L	GF	GA	GD	Pts	Qualification	ASA	LAG	JAC	SAN	SER	JUA	CSE	ATL
1	(Alagoas) ASA	14	7	4	3	15	12	+3	25	Advance to round of 32		1–1	1–1	2–0	1–0	1–0	2–3	1–0
2	(Sergipe) Lagarto	14	6	7	1	23	12	+11	25	Advance to round of 32	4–0		2–1	0–0	2–1	2–0	3–3	4–1
3	(Bahia) Jacuipense	14	5	6	3	19	15	+4	21	Advance to round of 32	0–0	2–2		2–0	1–1	1–2	2–1	1–1
4	(Pernambuco) Santa Cruz	14	5	4	5	14	15	−1	19	Advance to round of 32	1–2	1–1	0–2		1–0	1–0	2–1	3–2
5	Sergipe	14	4	6	4	14	12	+2	18		2–0	0–0	2–0	1–1		1–1	2–1	2–1
6	(Bahia) Juazeirense	14	4	4	6	8	13	−5	16		0–0	1–0	0–2	1–0	1–0		1–1	0–2
7	(Alagoas) CSE	14	3	5	6	19	22	−3	14		0–1	0–1	3–3	0–0	2–2	1–0		2–1
8	(Bahia) Atlético de Alagoinhas	14	2	4	8	13	24	−11	10		0–3	1–1	0–1	1–4	0–0	1–1	2–1	

Source: CBF
Rules for classification: 1) points; 2) wins; 3) goal difference; 4) goals scored; 5) head-to-head results (only between 2 teams); 6) fewest red cards; 7) fewest yellow cards; 8) draw.

=== Group A5 ===
Pos	Team	Pld	W	D	L	GF	GA	GD	Pts	Qualification	BRA	ANA	COS	CEO	CEI	IPO	GRE	AÇA
1	(Federal District (Brazil)) Brasiliense	14	10	3	1	22	10	+12	33	Advance to round of 32		1–1	0–2	2–1	2–1	2–2	2–0	2–1
2	(Goiás) Anápolis	14	7	4	3	17	11	+6	25	Advance to round of 32	0–2		1–0	0–1	2–0	1–0	0–1	2–0
3	(Mato Grosso do Sul) Costa Rica	14	6	3	5	14	13	+1	21	Advance to round of 32	0–1	1–1		1–0	0–3	1–0	1–1	2–0
4	(Mato Grosso) CEOV	14	6	3	5	10	12	−2	21	Advance to round of 32	0–2	0–0	1–0		1–2	1–0	1–0	1–1
5	(Federal District (Brazil)) Ceilândia	14	6	2	6	15	12	+3	20		0–1	1–2	1–0	3–0		0–0	1–0	1–0
6	(Goiás) Iporá	14	3	6	5	12	12	0	15		1–1	1–1	1–2	0–1	2–1		0–0	3–0
7	(Goiás) Grêmio Anápolis	14	3	5	6	12	14	−2	14		1–2	1–3	1–2	0–0	0–0	0–0		4–1
8	(Mato Grosso) Ação	14	1	2	11	12	30	−18	5		0–2	2–3	2–2	1–2	2–1	1–2	1–3	

Source: CBF
Rules for classification: 1) points; 2) wins; 3) goal difference; 4) goals scored; 5) head-to-head results (only between 2 teams); 6) fewest red cards; 7) fewest yellow cards; 8) draw.

=== Group A6 ===
Pos	Team	Pld	W	D	L	GF	GA	GD	Pts	Qualification	POU	BAH	REA	NOV	INT	FER	URT	CAL
1	(Minas Gerais) Pouso Alegre	14	7	5	2	12	9	+3	26	Advance to round of 32		0–0	2–1	1–1	2–1	0–0	2–0	1–0
2	Bahia de Feira	14	6	6	2	17	8	+9	24	Advance to round of 32	2–0		2–2	1–1	0–1	0–0	0–1	1–0
3	(Espírito Santo) Real Noroeste	14	6	5	3	19	13	+6	23	Advance to round of 32	0–0	1–1		1–0	2–2	3–0	0–0	2–1
4	(Espírito Santo) Nova Venécia	14	5	7	2	19	13	+6	22	Advance to round of 32	1–1	0–0	2–1		2–2	2–1	1–1	3–1
5	(São Paulo (state)) Inter de Limeira	14	4	5	5	16	16	0	17		3–0	0–1	1–3	2–1		0–1	1–0	0–1
6	(São Paulo (state)) Ferroviária	14	4	4	6	15	14	+1	16		0–1	0–2	1–2	0–0	1–1		8–0	1–0
7	(Minas Gerais) URT	14	4	4	6	13	26	−13	16		0–1	2–5	1–0	0–3	2–2	2–0		3–2
8	(Minas Gerais) Caldense	14	1	2	11	8	20	−12	5		0–1	0–2	0–1	1–2	0–0	1–2	1–1	

Source: CBF
Rules for classification: 1) points; 2) wins; 3) goal difference; 4) goals scored; 5) head-to-head results (only between 2 teams); 6) fewest red cards; 7) fewest yellow cards; 8) draw.

=== Group A7 ===
Pos	Team	Pld	W	D	L	GF	GA	GD	Pts	Qualification	SAO	PAR	POR	OES	NOV	SAN	CIA	PER
1	(São Paulo (state)) São Bernardo	14	7	6	1	13	3	+10	27	Advance to round of 32		1–1	0–0	3–0	1–0	1–0	1–0	4–0
2	(Paraná (state)) Paraná	14	6	5	3	13	8	+5	23	Advance to round of 32	0–0		2–0	0–1	2–1	1–0	1–2	2–0
3	(Rio de Janeiro (state)) Portuguesa	14	5	6	3	13	10	+3	21	Advance to round of 32	2–0	1–0		1–1	1–1	1–0	0–0	2–1
4	(São Paulo (state)) Oeste	14	5	5	4	14	15	−1	20	Advance to round of 32	0–0	0–0	2–1		1–1	2–0	2–1	0–1
5	(Rio de Janeiro (state)) Nova Iguaçu	14	5	5	4	13	14	−1	20		0–0	1–1	0–2	2–1		2–1	1–3	1–1
6	(São Paulo (state)) Santo André	14	4	3	7	12	13	−1	15		0–1	1–1	1–0	2–0	0–1		1–1	3–0
7	(Paraná (state)) Cianorte	14	3	5	6	14	15	−1	14		0–1	0–1	1–1	1–2	0–1	1–1		2–2
8	(Rio de Janeiro (state)) Pérolas Negras	14	1	5	8	9	23	−14	8		0–0	0–1	1–1	2–2	0–1	1–2	0–2	

Source: CBF
Rules for classification: 1) points; 2) wins; 3) goal difference; 4) goals scored; 5) head-to-head results (only between 2 teams); 6) fewest red cards; 7) fewest yellow cards; 8) draw.

=== Group A8 ===
Pos	Team	Pld	W	D	L	GF	GA	GD	Pts	Qualification	CAX	AIM	CAS	AZU	SAO	MAR	JUV	PRO
1	(Rio Grande do Sul) Caxias	14	8	3	3	20	12	+8	27	Advance to round of 32		4–2	0–0	1–0	2–1	3–1	1–0	1–0
2	(Rio Grande do Sul) Aimoré	14	8	3	3	17	14	+3	27	Advance to round of 32	1–1		0–1	0–0	2–1	3–2	2–0	1–0
3	(Paraná (state)) FC Cascavel	14	7	4	3	16	10	+6	25	Advance to round of 32	2–0	0–1		0–2	2–1	3–0	1–0	1–0
4	(Paraná (state)) Azuriz	14	7	3	4	17	12	+5	24	Advance to round of 32	1–0	3–0	3–2		1–2	1–0	0–2	0–0
5	(Rio Grande do Sul) São Luiz	14	4	6	4	18	17	+1	18		1–1	0–1	0–0	2–0		1–0	2–2	3–2
6	(Santa Catarina (state)) Marcílio Dias	14	4	2	8	14	20	−6	14		2–1	2–3	1–1	0–1	1–1		2–1	2–0
7	(Santa Catarina (state)) Juventus	14	2	6	6	11	17	−6	12		0–3	0–0	1–1	2–2	1–1	1–0		0–1
8	(Santa Catarina (state)) Próspera	14	1	3	10	9	20	−11	6		1–2	0–1	1–2	1–3	2–2	0–1	1–1	

Source: CBF
Rules for classification: 1) points; 2) wins; 3) goal difference; 4) goals scored; 5) head-to-head results (only between 2 teams); 6) fewest red cards; 7) fewest yellow cards; 8) draw.

== Final stages ==
The final stages were played on a home-and-away two-legged basis. For the round of 16, semi-finals and finals, the best-overall-performance team hosted the second leg. If tied on aggregate, the away goals rule would not be used, extra time would not be played, and the penalty shoot-out would be used to determine the winners (Regulations Article 18).

For the quarter-finals, teams were seeded based on the table of results of all matches in the competition. The top four seeded teams hosted the second leg.

The four quarter-finals winners were promoted to 2023 Série C.

=== Round of 32 ===
The round of 32 was a two-legged knockout tie, with the draw regionalised. The matches were played from 23 July to 1 August.

==== Matches ====
Team 1	Agg.	Team 2	1st leg	2nd leg
Juventude Samas (Maranhão)	1–2	(Amazonas (Brazilian state)) Amazonas	0–0	1–2
São Raimundo-AM (Amazonas (Brazilian state))	3–6	(Tocantins) Tocantinópolis	2–2	1–4
São Raimundo-RR (Roraima)	1–1 (7–8 p)	(Maranhão) Moto Club	0–0	1–1
Pacajus (Ceará)	1–1 (4–5 p)	(Acre (state)) Rio Branco	1–1	0–0
Santa Cruz (Pernambuco)	2–1	(Pernambuco) Retrô	0–0	2–1
Sousa (Paraíba)	1–3	(Sergipe) Lagarto	0–1	1–2
Afogados (Pernambuco)	1–4	(Alagoas) ASA	1–2	0–2
Jacuipense (Bahia)	0–1	(Rio Grande do Norte) América de Natal	0–1	0–0
Nova Venécia (Espírito Santo)	4–2	(Federal District (Brazil)) Brasiliense	3–1	1–1
Costa Rica (Mato Grosso do Sul)	1–2	Bahia de Feira	0–0	1–2
CEOV (Mato Grosso)	0–2	(Minas Gerais) Pouso Alegre	0–0	0–2
Real Noroeste (Espírito Santo)	5–5 (3–1 p)	(Goiás) Anápolis	5–2	0–3
Azuriz (Paraná (state))	1–3	(São Paulo (state)) São Bernardo	1–1	0–2
Portuguesa (Rio de Janeiro (state))	1–1 (4–3 p)	(Rio Grande do Sul) Aimoré	0–1	1–0
Oeste (São Paulo (state))	2–2 (5–6 p)	(Rio Grande do Sul) Caxias	1–1	1–1
FC Cascavel (Paraná (state))	0–0 (4–5 p)	(Paraná (state)) Paraná	0–0	0–0

=== Round of 16 ===
The matches were played from 6 to 14 August.

==== Matches ====
Team 1	Agg.	Team 2	1st leg	2nd leg
Lagarto (Sergipe)	2–3	(Amazonas (Brazilian state)) Amazonas	1–1	1–2
Santa Cruz (Pernambuco)	0–1	(Tocantins) Tocantinópolis	0–0	0–1
América de Natal (Rio Grande do Norte)	3–1	(Maranhão) Moto Club	2–1	1–0
Rio Branco (Acre (state))	0–0 (4–5 p)	(Alagoas) ASA	0–0	0–0
Portuguesa (Rio de Janeiro (state))	4–3	(Espírito Santo) Nova Venécia	2–1	2–2
Bahia de Feira	1–2	(São Paulo (state)) São Bernardo	0–1	1–1
Paraná (Paraná (state))	1–2	(Minas Gerais) Pouso Alegre	1–1	0–1
Real Noroeste (Espírito Santo)	1–1 (0–3 p)	(Rio Grande do Sul) Caxias	1–1	0–0

=== Quarter-finals ===
The draw for the quarter-finals was seeded based on the table of results of all matches in the competition for the qualifying teams. The teams were ranked according to points. If tied on points, the following criteria would be used to determine the ranking: 1. Wins; 2. Goal difference; 3. Goals scored; 4. Fewest red cards; 5. Fewest yellow cards; 6. Draw in the headquarters of the Brazilian Football Confederation (Regulations Article 15).

==== Quarter-finals seedings ====
Seed	Team	Pts	W	GD
1	(Amazonas (Brazilian state)) Amazonas	39	11	+27
2	(São Paulo (state)) São Bernardo	35	9	+13
3	(Rio Grande do Norte) América de Natal	34	9	+16
4	(Minas Gerais) Pouso Alegre	34	9	+6
5	(Alagoas) ASA	33	9	+6
6	(Rio Grande do Sul) Caxias	31	8	+8
7	(Tocantins) Tocantinópolis	30	8	+6
8	(Rio de Janeiro (state)) Portuguesa	28	7	+4

==== Matches ====
The matches were played from 20 to 28 August.

Team 1	Agg.	Team 2	1st leg	2nd leg
Portuguesa (Rio de Janeiro (state))	3–4	(Amazonas (Brazilian state)) Amazonas	1–1	2–3
ASA (Alagoas)	0–3	(Minas Gerais) Pouso Alegre	0–2	0–1
Tocantinópolis (Tocantins)	0–5	(São Paulo (state)) São Bernardo	0–3	0–2
Caxias (Rio Grande do Sul)	2–3	(Rio Grande do Norte) América de Natal	1–0	1–3

=== Semi-finals ===
The matches were played from 3 to 11 September.

==== Matches ====
Team 1	Agg.	Team 2	1st leg	2nd leg
Pouso Alegre (Minas Gerais)	2–0	(Amazonas (Brazilian state)) Amazonas	1–0	1–0
América de Natal (Rio Grande do Norte)	3–0	(São Paulo (state)) São Bernardo	2–0	1–0

=== Finals ===
The matches were played on 18 and 25 September.

==== Matches ====
Team 1	Agg.	Team 2	1st leg	2nd leg
América de Natal (Rio Grande do Norte)	2–1	(Minas Gerais) Pouso Alegre	2–0	0–1

18 September 2022
16:00

América de Natal (Rio Grande do Norte)	2–0	(Minas Gerais) Pouso Alegre
Téssio 11'; Wallace Pernambucano 85' (pen.)	Report

Arena das Dunas, Natal
Attendance: 30,509
Referee: Rodrigo José Pereira de Lima (Pernambuco)

25 September 2022
16:00

Pouso Alegre (Minas Gerais)	1–0	(Rio Grande do Norte) América de Natal
Victor Pereira 90+3'	Report

Manduzão, Pouso Alegre
Attendance: 13,652
Referee: Ramon Abatti Abel (Santa Catarina)

== Top goalscorers ==
Rank	Player	Team	Goals
1	Ítalo	(Amazonas (Brazilian state)) Amazonas	11
1	Rafael Tavares	(Amazonas (Brazilian state)) Amazonas	11
3	Aleílson	(Amapá) Trem	10
3	Mascote	(Pernambuco) Retrô	10
5	Anderson	(Pernambuco) Afogados	9
5	Patrick Carvalho	(Espírito Santo) Nova Venécia	9
5	Wallace Pernambucano	(Rio Grande do Norte) América de Natal	9
8	Lucas Rian	(Sergipe) Lagarto	8
9	Hugo Cabral	(Pernambuco) Santa Cruz	7
9	Janderson	Bahia de Feira	7

Source: CBF
