= 2023 Campeonato Paraibano =

113th edition of Paraíba's football league

Campeonato Paraibano de Futebol
- Season: 2023
- Dates: 7 January 2023 – 8 April 2023
- Champions: Treze
- Relegated: Queimadense; Auto Esporte
- 2024 Copa do Brasil: Treze; Sousa
- 2024 Série D: Treze; Sousa
- 2024 Copa do Nordeste: Treze
- 2024 Copa do Nordeste qualification: Sousa; Botafogo-PB (via CBF ranking)
- Matches: 52
- Goals: 106 (2.04 per match)
- Top goalscorer: 6 Luiz Henrique, Sousa
- Biggest home win: Sousa 4–0 Auto Esporte; Round 1 (rearranged), 15 February 2023
- Biggest away win: Queimadense 0–3 Nacional de Patos; Round 8, 27 February 2023
- Highest scoring: Treze 3–2 Auto Esporte; Round 3, 16 January 2023; Serra Branca 3–2 Auto Esporte; Round 8, 23 February 2023; Sousa 4–1 CSP; Round 9, 12 March 2023
- Longest winning run: 2 Sousa; São Paulo Crystal; Botafogo-PB
- Longest unbeaten run: 10 Botafogo-PB
- Longest winless run: 9 Auto Esporte; Queimadense
- Longest losing run: 4 Auto Esporte
- All statistics correct as of 17:56, 14 April 2023 (UTC).

The 2023 Campeonato Paraibano de Futebol was the 113th edition of Paraíba's top professional football league. The competition started on 7 January 2023 and finished on 8 April 2023.

Treze were declared champions after defeating Sousa in the final.

== Format ==
The format of the competition was amended from the previous season, and featured a group stage where each of the ten teams faced each other once. The top four proceeded to a knockout semi-final and final, each over two legs. The bottom two teams in the group stage were relegated to the second division.

Due to each team having nine games in the group stage, some had to have 5 home games and others had to have 4 home games, which was decided by drawing of lots.

The semi-final was drawn according to finishing places in the group stage. First played fourth and second played third, with the higher placed team at home in the second legs. The best performing team in the semi-finals was at home in the second leg of the final.

=== Qualification ===
The two finalists qualified to participate in the 2024 Copa do Brasil, unless they obtained qualification via other means, in which case the place passed to the third-placed team. The champion qualified to participate in the 2024 Copa do Nordeste. The two best placed teams (other than those already participating in a national league) qualified to participate in the 2024 Campeonato Brasileiro Série D.

== Participating teams ==
Club	Home City	Manager	2022 Result
Auto Esporte Clube	João Pessoa	Douglas Andrade	7th
Botafogo Futebol Clube (Botafogo-PB)	João Pessoa	Francisco Diá	2nd
Campinense Clube	Campina Grande	Leston Júnior	1st
Centro Sportivo Paraibano (CSP)	João Pessoa	Josivaldo Alves	8th
Nacional Atlético Clube (Nacional de Patos)	Patos	Flávio Araújo	4th
Sociedade Esportiva Queimadense	Queimadas	Hélio Cabral	2nd (Second Division)
São Paulo Crystal Futebol Clube	Cruz do Espírito Santo	Higor César	6th
Serra Branca Esporte Clube	Serra Branca	Sérgio China	1st (Second Division)
Sousa Esporte Clube	Sousa	Renatinho Potiguar	3rd
Treze Futebol Clube	Campina Grande	Dema	5th

== Group phase ==
Pos	Team	Pld	W	D	L	GF	GA	GD	Pts	Qualification
1	Sousa (Q)	9	6	2	1	14	4	+10	20	Advance to semi-final stage
2	Treze (Q)	9	4	3	2	11	7	+4	15	Advance to semi-final stage
3	São Paulo Crystal (Q)	9	4	3	2	7	6	+1	15	Advance to semi-final stage
4	Botafogo-PB (Q)	9	3	6	0	11	6	+5	15	Advance to semi-final stage
5	Nacional de Patos	9	4	2	3	11	8	+3	14	
6	Campinense	9	3	5	1	8	6	+2	14	
7	CSP	9	2	3	4	9	13	−4	9	
8	Serra Branca	9	1	6	2	8	11	−3	9	
9	Queimadense (R)	9	0	4	5	6	13	−7	4	Relegated to Second Division
10	Auto Esporte (R)	9	0	2	7	7	18	−11	2	Relegated to Second Division

Rules for classification: 1) points; 2) wins; 3) goal difference; 4) number of goals scored; 5) least red cards; 6) least yellow cards.
(Q) Qualified for the phase indicated; (R) Relegated

== Semi-final ==
The semi-finals paired first vs fourth and second vs third from the group stage and were played over two legs, with a penalty shoot-out deciding the tie if results were level. The higher placed team in the group stage were given home advantage in the second leg.

Team 1	Agg.	Team 2	1st leg	2nd leg
Botafogo-PB	2–5	Sousa	1–0	1–5
São Paulo Crystal	1–2	Treze	1–1	0–1

=== First legs ===
18 March 2023	Botafogo-PB	1–0	Sousa	João Pessoa
18:00 BRT	Mateus Anderson 47'	Report		Stadium: Almeidão

19 March 2023	São Paulo Crystal	1–1	Treze	Cruz do Espírito Santo
16:00 BRT	Rickelme 58'	Report	Saulo 82'	Stadium: Carneirão

=== Second legs ===
26 March 2023	Sousa	5–1	Botafogo-PB	Sousa
16:00 BRT	Carlos Vitor 1'; Marcel 25'; Daniel Costa 52', 88'; Luiz Henrique 73'	Report	Eduardo Grasson 10'	Stadium: Marizão

26 March 2023	Treze	1–0	São Paulo Crystal	Campina Grande
17:00 BRT	Jhonathan Moc 28'	Report		Stadium: Amigão

== Final ==
The final saw the winning semi-finalist with the best overall campaign awarded the home advantage for the second leg.

Team 1	Agg.	Team 2	1st leg	2nd leg
Treze	3–3 (4–2 p)	Sousa	2–1	0–1

=== First leg ===
1 April 2023	Treze	2–1	Sousa	Campina Grande
16:30 BRT	Vitão 5'; Edmundo 50'	Report	Histone 39'	Stadium: Amigão

=== Second leg ===
8 April 2023	Sousa	1–0 (2–4 p)	Treze	Sousa
16:30 BRT	Rodrigo Poty	Report		Stadium: Marizão
	Penalties
	Daniel Costa (penalty scored); Guilherme Lucena (penalty scored); Gabriel Recife (penalty missed); Maceió (penalty missed)		Roberto (penalty scored); Kauê Pires (penalty scored); Jhonathan Moc (penalty scored); Saulo (penalty scored)

Treze are champions of 2023 Campeonato Paraibano
