= 2022 Copa do Nordeste qualification =

Tournament details
- Country: Brazil
- Dates: 12 October – 18 November 2021
- Teams: 24

Tournament statistics
- Matches played: 24
- Goals scored: 70 (2.92 per match)
- Top goal scorer: Negueba (3 goals)

The 2022 Copa do Nordeste qualification (officially the Eliminatórias Copa do Nordeste 2022) was the qualifying tournament of the 2022 Copa do Nordeste. It was played from 12 October to 18 November 2021. Twenty-four teams competed to decide four places in the Copa do Nordeste.

== Format changes ==
The tournament was renamed from Pré-Copa do Nordeste to Eliminatórias Copa do Nordeste. Starting from this season, the following format changes were implemented:

- The tournament was expanded from eight to twenty-four teams. The teams either qualified by participating in their respective state championships or by the 2021 CBF ranking.
- The teams competed in three rounds where the four winners advanced to the Copa do Nordeste (initially 8 teams would compete in one round).

== Qualified teams ==
The three best placed federations in the 2021 CBF state ranking (Ceará, Bahia, and Pernambuco) earned three berths in the tournament, while the remaining six federations earned two. Additionally, it also qualified the three best placed teams in the CBF 2021 ranking not already qualified regardless of the federation.

Association	Team	Qualification method
(Alagoas) Alagoas; 2 berths	CRB	2021 Campeonato Alagoano runners-up
(Alagoas) Alagoas; 2 berths	ASA	best placed team in the 2021 CBF ranking not already qualified
(Bahia) Bahia; 3 + 1 berths	Bahia de Feira	2021 Campeonato Baiano runners-up
(Bahia) Bahia; 3 + 1 berths	Juazeirense	2021 Campeonato Baiano 3rd place
(Bahia) Bahia; 3 + 1 berths	Vitória	best placed team in the 2021 CBF ranking not already qualified
(Bahia) Bahia; 3 + 1 berths	Jacuipense	best placed team in the 2021 CBF ranking not already qualified
(Ceará) Ceará; 3 berths	Ferroviário	2021 Campeonato Cearense 3rd place
(Ceará) Ceará; 3 berths	Atlético Cearense	2021 Campeonato Cearense 4th place
(Ceará) Ceará; 3 berths	Floresta	best placed team in the 2021 CBF ranking not already qualified
(Maranhão) Maranhão; 2 berths	Moto Club	2021 Campeonato Maranhense runners-up
(Maranhão) Maranhão; 2 berths	Imperatriz	best placed team in the 2021 CBF ranking not already qualified
(Paraíba) Paraíba; 2 + 1 berths	Sousa	2021 Campeonato Paraibano runners-up
(Paraíba) Paraíba; 2 + 1 berths	Botafogo-PB	best placed team in the 2021 CBF ranking not already qualified
(Paraíba) Paraíba; 2 + 1 berths	Treze	best placed team in the 2021 CBF ranking not already qualified
(Pernambuco) Pernambuco; 3 berths	Santa Cruz	2021 Campeonato Pernambucano 4th place
(Pernambuco) Pernambuco; 3 berths	Retrô^{[a]}	2021 Campeonato Pernambucano 7th place
(Pernambuco) Pernambuco; 3 berths	Central	best placed team in the 2021 CBF ranking not already qualified
(Piauí) Piauí; 2 berths	Fluminense-PI	2021 Campeonato Piauiense runners-up
(Piauí) Piauí; 2 berths	River	best placed team in the 2021 CBF ranking not already qualified
(Rio Grande do Norte) Rio Grande do Norte; 2 berths	ABC	2021 Campeonato Potiguar runners-up
(Rio Grande do Norte) Rio Grande do Norte; 2 berths	América de Natal	best placed team in the 2021 CBF ranking not already qualified
(Sergipe) Sergipe; 2 + 1 berths	Lagarto	2021 Campeonato Sergipano runners-up
(Sergipe) Sergipe; 2 + 1 berths	Confiança	best placed team in the 2021 CBF ranking not already qualified
(Sergipe) Sergipe; 2 + 1 berths	Itabaiana	best placed team in the 2021 CBF ranking not already qualified

^{a} Salgueiro, Afogados and Vera Cruz (2021 Campeonato Pernambucano 3rd place, 5th place and 6th place, respectively) declined to participate in the Copa do Nordeste. They were replaced by the 7th place Retrô.

== Schedule ==
The schedule of the competition was as follows.

Round	First leg	Second leg
First round	12–16 October 2021	
Second round	19–21 October 2021	
Third round	26–30 October 2021	2–18 November 2021

== Draw ==
The draw for the group stage was held on 2 September 2021, 12:00, at the CBF headquarters in Rio de Janeiro. The teams were seeded by their 2021 CBF ranking (shown in parentheses) and divided in four pots.

Pot I	Pot II	Pot III A	Pot III B
(Maranhão) Imperatriz (61); (Paraíba) Treze (65); (Maranhão) Moto Club (67); (Bahia) Jacuipense (71); (Sergipe) Itabaiana (73); (Piauí) River (77); (Alagoas) ASA (78); (Bahia) Juazeirense (81)	(Pernambuco) Central (86); (Ceará) Floresta (91); Bahia de Feira (103); (Ceará) Atlético Cearense (119); (Paraíba) Sousa (192); (Sergipe) Lagarto (209); (Piauí) Fluminense-PI (no rank); (Pernambuco) Retrô (no rank)	(Bahia) Vitória (23); (Alagoas) CRB (31); (Pernambuco) Santa Cruz (41); (Sergipe) Confiança (47)	(Paraíba) Botafogo-PB (49); (Rio Grande do Norte) ABC (52); (Ceará) Ferroviário (57); (Rio Grande do Norte) América de Natal (59)

For the first round, the sixteen teams from the Pots I and II were drawn into eight ties, with the teams from the Pot I hosting the leg. For the second round, the eight teams from the Pots III A and III B were drawn into eight ties, while the eight winners of the first round were allocated without any draw into the ties. For the third round, the eight winners of the second round were allocated without any draw into the following four ties, with the team in each tie with the higher CBF ranking hosting the second leg. Teams from the Pot III A could not be drawn into the same tie.

== Competition format ==
The teams played a single-elimination tournament with the following rules:

- The first and second rounds were played on a single-leg basis, with the higher-seeded team hosting the leg.
  - If tied, the penalty shoot-out would be used to determine the winners.
- The third round was played on a home-and-away two-legged basis, with the higher-seeded team hosting the second leg.
  - If tied on aggregate, the penalty shoot-out would be used to determine the winners.
- Extra time would not be played and away goals rule would not be used during the tournament.

== First round ==
Team 1	Score	Team 2
River (Piauí)	5–0	(Sergipe) Lagarto
Moto Club (Maranhão)	3–2	(Pernambuco) Retrô
Treze (Paraíba)	1–3	(Ceará) Floresta
Juazeirense (Bahia)	1–0	(Pernambuco) Central
ASA (Alagoas)	1–2	(Paraíba) Sousa
Jacuipense (Bahia)	1–0	(Ceará) Atlético Cearense
Itabaiana (Sergipe)	1–1 (3–1 p)	Bahia de Feira
Imperatriz (Maranhão)	1–1 (5–4 p)	(Piauí) Fluminense-PI

== Second round ==
Team 1	Score	Team 2
CRB (Alagoas)	2–1	(Piauí) River
América de Natal (Rio Grande do Norte)	1–1 (4–5 p)	(Maranhão) Moto Club
Santa Cruz (Pernambuco)	3–3 (2–4 p)	(Ceará) Floresta
Ferroviário (Ceará)	4–0	(Bahia) Juazeirense
Confiança (Sergipe)	1–1 (4–5 p)	(Paraíba) Sousa
ABC (Rio Grande do Norte)	4–2	(Bahia) Jacuipense
Vitória (Bahia)	3–0	(Sergipe) Itabaiana
Botafogo-PB (Paraíba)	2–0	(Maranhão) Imperatriz

== Third round ==
Team 1	Agg.	Team 2	1st leg	2nd leg
Moto Club (Maranhão)	2–3	(Alagoas) CRB	2–1	0–2
Floresta (Ceará)	1–1 (4–3 p)	(Ceará) Ferroviário	0–0	1–1
Sousa (Paraíba)	4–2	(Rio Grande do Norte) ABC	3–0	1–2
Botafogo-PB (Paraíba)	3–3 (6–5 p)	(Bahia) Vitória	1–1	2–2

== 2022 Copa do Nordeste qualified teams ==
The following four teams qualified for the 2022 Copa do Nordeste.

State	Team
Alagoas	CRB
Ceará	Floresta
Paraíba	Sousa
Paraíba	Botafogo-PB

== Top goalscorers ==
Rank	Player	Team	Goals
1	(Brazil) Negueba	(Rio Grande do Norte) ABC	3
1	(Brazil) Arthur	(Paraíba) Sousa	2
1	(Brazil) Éderson	(Paraíba) Botafogo-PB	2
1	(Brazil) Edson Cariús	(Ceará) Ferroviário	2
1	(Brazil) Emerson Negueba	(Alagoas) CRB	2
1	(Brazil) Fabio Alves	(Ceará) Floresta	2
1	(Brazil) Igor Bádio	(Piauí) River	2
1	(Brazil) Maílson	(Ceará) Floresta	2
1	(Brazil) Pipico	(Pernambuco) Santa Cruz	2
1	(Brazil) Wallace Lima	(Maranhão) Moto Club	2
1	(Brazil) Wallyson	(Rio Grande do Norte) ABC	2

Source:CBF
