= Danilo Lerda =

Argentine footballer (born 1987)

Personal information
- Full name: Danilo Emanuel Lerda
- Date of birth: 30 March 1987 (age 39)
- Place of birth: Arias, Córdoba, Argentina
- Height: 1.89 m (6 ft 2 1/2 in)
- Position: Goalkeeper

Team information
- Current team: Deportivo Maldonado

Youth career
- 2004–2008: Fénix

Senior career*
Years	Team	Apps	(Gls)
2009–2011	Fénix	35	(0)
2012–2014	Peñarol	17	(0)
2014–2015	Talleres	1	(0)
2015–2016	Atlético CP	23	(1)
2016	Danubio	2	(0)
2017–	Deportivo Maldonado	76	(0)
- * Club domestic league appearances and goals as of 22:07, 29 October 2019 (UTC)

Danilo Emanuel Lerda (born 30 March 1987) is an Argentine footballer who plays as a goalkeeper for Deportivo Maldonado.

== Career ==
Born in Arias, Córdoba, Lerda spent most of his career playing in Uruguay. In 2004, he was caught by Uruguayan football agent Jorge Chijane in Rosario and was sent to play in the youth levels of Fénix.

In January 2012, he signed a new contract with Uruguayan giants Peñarol. He did not have much continuity on the first team due to some game mistakes. He was a reserve during his spell with Penarol, and Lerda was on the substitute's bench as the club won the 2012–13 Uruguayan Primera División season title.

In July 2014, he was transferred to his native city club Talleres de Córdoba to play in the Torneo Argentino A.

On 24 July 2015, he signed a new deal with Segunda Liga side Atlético CP.

Since 2017, Lerda has played for Deportivo Maldonado.
