= Juan Pablo Compagnucci =

Argentine footballer

Juan Compagnucci
Personal information
- Full name: Juan Pablo Compagnucci
- Date of birth: 18 November 1986 (age 39)
- Place of birth: Monte Buey, Argentina
- Height: 1.84 m (6 ft 0 in)
- Position: Defender

Team information
- Current team: Sarmiento Leones

Senior career*
Years	Team	Apps	(Gls)
2008–2009	CA Colegiales	?	(?)
2009–2011	Sportivo Belgrano	?	(?)
2011–2012	Lokomotiv Plovdiv	5	(0)
2012–2013	Santamarina	19	(0)
2013–	Sarmiento Leones		
- * Club domestic league appearances and goals

Juan Pablo Compagnucci (born 18 November 1986, in Monte Buey) is an Argentine footballer who plays for Sarmiento Leones.
