= 2021 Campeonato Baiano =

Campeonato Baiano
- Season: 2021
- Dates: 17 February – 23 May
- Champions: Atlético de Alagoinhas
- Relegated: Fluminense de Feira
- Copa do Brasil: Atlético de Alagoinhas; Bahia de Feira; Juazeirense; Bahia (via Copa do Nordeste)
- Série D: Atlético de Alagoinhas; Bahia de Feira; Juazeirense
- Copa do Nordeste: Atlético de Alagoinhas; Bahia (via RNC)
- Copa do Nordeste qualification: Bahia de Feira; Juazeirense; Vitória (via RNC); Jacuipense (via RNC)
- Matches: 51
- Goals: 111 (2.18 per match)
- Top goalscorer: Ronan (5 goals)

The 2021 Campeonato Baiano (officially the Campeonato Baiano de Futebol Profissional Série “A” – Edição 2021) was the 117th edition of Bahia's top professional football league. The competition began on 17 February and ended on 23 May. Bahia were the defending champions but they were eliminated in the semi-finals.

The finals were played between Atlético de Alagoinhas and Bahia de Feira. This was the first season of the Campeonato Baiano with the finals played between two teams from outside of Salvador. Atlético de Alagoinhas won 5–4 on aggregate obtaining the first title. As champions, Atlético de Alagoinhas qualified for the 2022 Copa do Brasil and the 2022 Copa do Nordeste.

== Format ==
In the first stage, each team played the other nine teams in a single round-robin tournament. Top four teams advanced to the semi-finals. The team with the lowest number of points was relegated to the 2022 Campeonato Baiano Série B. The final stage was played on a home-and-away two-legged basis with the best overall performance team hosting the second leg. If tied on aggregate, the penalty shoot-out would be used to determine the winners.

Champions qualified for the 2022 Copa do Brasil and 2022 Copa do Nordeste, while runners-up and third place qualified for the 2022 Copa do Brasil. Top three teams not already qualified for 2022 Série A, Série B or Série C qualified for 2022 Campeonato Brasileiro Série D.

== Participating teams ==
Club	Home city
Atlético de Alagoinhas	Alagoinhas
Bahia	Salvador
Bahia de Feira	Feira de Santana
Doce Mel	Ipiaú
Fluminense de Feira	Feira de Santana
Jacuipense	Riachão do Jacuípe
Juazeirense	Juazeiro
UNIRB	Alagoinhas
Vitória	Salvador
Vitória da Conquista	Vitória da Conquista

== First stage ==
Pos	Team	Pld	W	D	L	GF	GA	GD	Pts	Qualification or relegation
1	Juazeirense	9	5	3	1	13	10	+3	18	Advance to Semi-finals
2	Bahia de Feira	9	4	3	2	12	6	+6	15	Advance to Semi-finals
3	Bahia	9	4	3	2	8	5	+3	15	Advance to Semi-finals
4	Atlético de Alagoinhas	9	4	1	4	12	11	+1	13	Advance to Semi-finals
5	Vitória	9	2	5	2	11	10	+1	11	
6	Jacuipense	9	2	5	2	8	8	0	11	
7	Vitória da Conquista	9	3	1	5	8	9	−1	10	
8	UNIRB	9	2	4	3	7	10	−3	10	
9	Doce Mel	9	2	4	3	6	10	−4	10	
10	Fluminense de Feira (R)	9	1	3	5	9	15	−6	6	Relegation to Campeonato Baiano Série B

Source: FBF
Rules for classification: 1) Points; 2) Wins; 3) Goal difference; 4) Goals scored; 5) Head-to-head result; 6) Fewest red cards; 7) Fewest yellow cards; 8) Draw.
(R) Relegated

== Final stage ==
=== Semi-finals ===
Team 1	Agg.	Team 2	1st leg	2nd leg
Atlético de Alagoinhas	2–2 (3–2 p)	Juazeirense	2–1	0–1
Bahia	1–3	Bahia de Feira	1–0	0–3

==== Group 2 ====
9 May 2021
16:00

Atlético de Alagoinhas	2–1	Juazeirense
Dionísio 23'; Vitinho 57'	Report	Thauan 77'

Estádio Municipal Antônio de Figueiredo Carneiro, Alagoinhas
Attendance: 0
Referee: Ricarle Gustavo Gonçalves Batista

12 May 2021
19:30

Juazeirense	1–0	Atlético de Alagoinhas
Kesley 57'	Report
Penalties
Patrik (penalty scored); Jô (penalty missed); Wendell (penalty scored); Rayllan (penalty missed); Kesley (penalty missed)	2–3	(penalty missed) Dionísio; (penalty scored) Vitinho; (penalty scored) Ronan; (penalty scored) Edson

Estádio Adauto Moraes, Juazeiro
Attendance: 0
Referee: Reinaldo Silva de Santana

Atlético de Alagoinhas qualified for the finals.

==== Group 3 ====
9 May 2021
18:00

Bahia	1–0	Bahia de Feira
Pablo 57'	Report

Estádio de Pituaçu, Salvador
Attendance: 0
Referee: Marielson Alves Silva

12 May 2021
21:30

Bahia de Feira	3–0	Bahia
Bruninho 8'; Diones 85'; Felipe Valdívia 90'	Report

Estádio Jodilton Souza, Feira de Santana
Attendance: 0
Referee: Ricarle Gustavo Gonçalves Batista

Bahia de Feira qualified for the finals.

=== Finals ===
Team 1	Agg.	Team 2	1st leg	2nd leg
Atlético de Alagoinhas	5–4	Bahia de Feira	2–2	3–2

==== Group 4 ====
16 May 2021
16:00

Atlético de Alagoinhas	2–2	Bahia de Feira
Ronan 86' (pen.), 90+12'	Report	Jarbas 75'; Adriano Ferreira 90+11'

Estádio Municipal Antônio de Figueiredo Carneiro, Alagoinhas
Attendance: 0
Referee: Emerson Ricardo de Almeida Andrade

23 May 2021
16:00

Bahia de Feira	2–3	Atlético de Alagoinhas
Iran 18' (o.g.); Marcone Pelé 90'	Report	Iran 24'; Ronan 45+2' (pen.); Dionísio 70'

Estádio Jodilton Souza, Feira de Santana
Attendance: 0
Referee: Marielson Alves Silva

== General table ==
Pos	Team	Pld	W	D	L	GF	GA	GD	Pts	Qualification or relegation
1	Atlético de Alagoinhas	13	6	2	5	19	17	+2	20	Champions, 2022 Copa do Brasil and 2022 Série D
2	Bahia de Feira	13	5	4	4	19	12	+7	19	Runners-up, 2022 Copa do Brasil and 2022 Série D
3	Juazeirense	11	6	3	2	15	12	+3	21	2022 Copa do Brasil and 2022 Série D
4	Bahia	11	5	3	3	9	8	+1	18	
5	Vitória	9	2	5	2	11	10	+1	11	
6	Jacuipense	9	2	5	2	8	8	0	11	
7	Vitória da Conquista	9	3	1	5	8	9	−1	10	
8	UNIRB	9	2	4	3	7	10	−3	10	
9	Doce Mel	9	2	4	3	6	10	−4	10	
10	Fluminense de Feira	9	1	3	5	9	15	−6	6	Relegation to 2022 Campeonato Baiano Série B

Source: FBF
Rules for classification: 1) Points; 2) Wins; 3) Goal difference; 4) Goals scored; 5) Head-to-head result; 6) Fewest red cards; 7) Fewest yellow cards; 8) Draw.

== Top goalscorers ==
Rank	Player	Team	Goals
1	Ronan	Atlético de Alagoinhas	5
2	Deon	Bahia de Feira	4
2	Diones	Bahia de Feira	4
2	Dionísio	Atlético de Alagoinhas	4
2	Kesley	Juazeirense	4
2	Léo Dias	Vitória da Conquista	4
7	Dinei	Jacuipense	3
7	Emerson Catarina	Fluminense de Feira	3
7	Soares	Vitória	3
