= Rogerinho =

Rogerinho is a nickname. Notable people with the name include:

- Rogerinho (footballer, born 1979), born Rogerio Cannellini, Brazilian football midfielder
- Rogerinho (footballer, born 1984), born Rogério Miranda Silva, Brazilian football attacking midfielder
- Rogerinho (footballer, born 1987), born Rogério de Assis Silva Coutinho, Brazilian football forward
- Rogerinho (footballer, born 1996), born Rogério Joséda Silva, Brazilian football forward
