= Juan Pablo Vojvoda =

Argentine footballer and manager

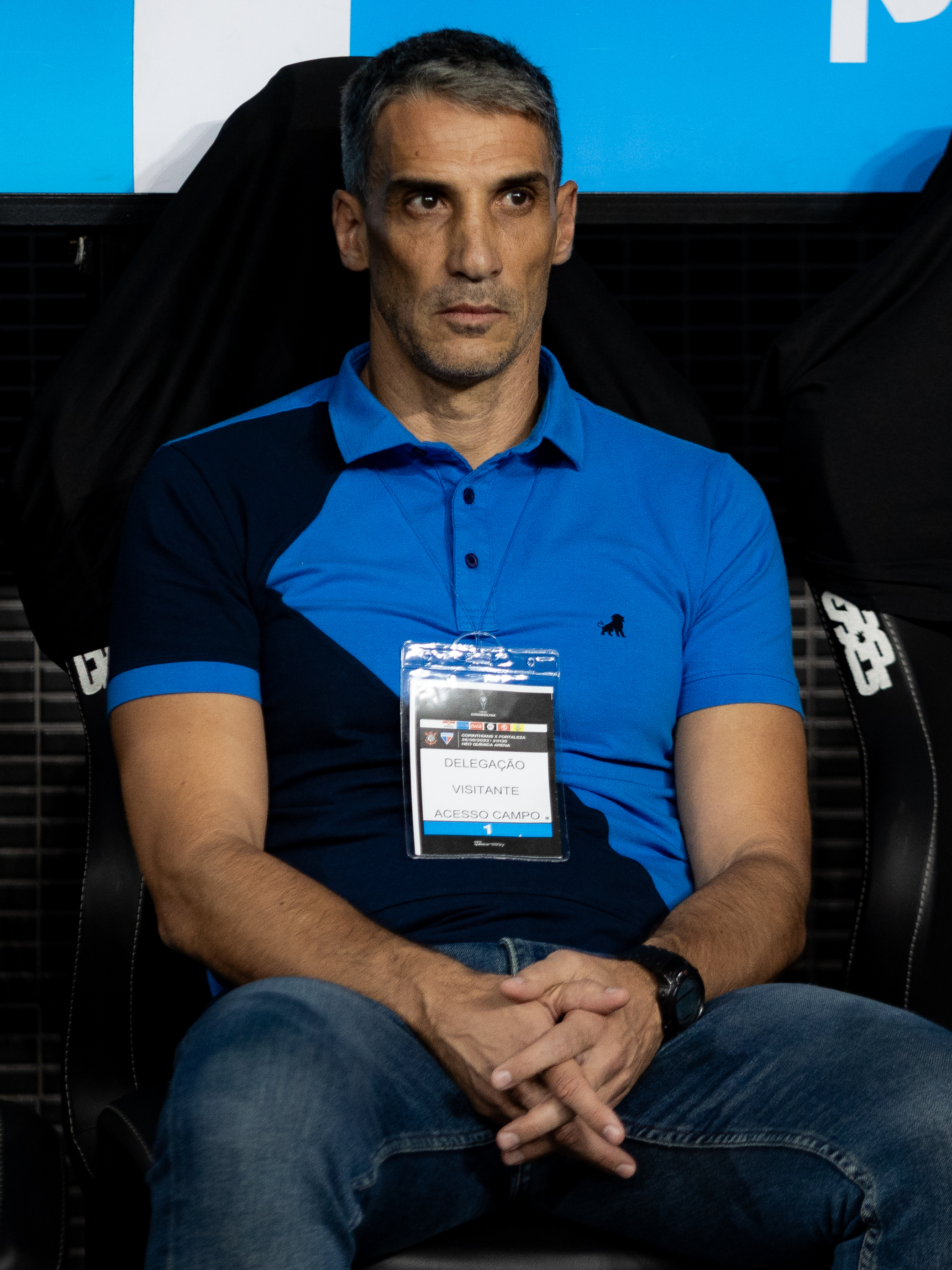
- Vojvoda in 2023

Personal information
- Full name: Juan Pablo Vojvoda Rizzo
- Date of birth: 13 January 1975 (age 51)
- Place of birth: General Baldissera, Argentina
- Height: 1.85 m (6 ft 1 in)
- Position: Centre-back

Team information
- Current team: Fortaleza (head coach)

Youth career
- Cruz Alta
- 1989–1995: Newell's Old Boys

Senior career*
| Years | Team | Apps | (Gls) |
| 1995–2003 | Newell's Old Boys | 126 | (4) |
| 2002–2003 | → Compostela (loan) | 28 | (0) |
| 2003–2005 | Algeciras | 55 | (0) |
| 2005–2006 | Cultural Leonesa | 32 | (0) |
| 2006–2009 | Baza | 106 | (11) |
| 2009–2010 | Tiro Federal | 34 | (0) |
| 2010–2012 | Sportivo Belgrano | 80 | (1) |
| 2012–2013 | Sarmiento de Leones | 24 | (1) |
| Total | | 485 | (17) |

Managerial career
- 2013–2017: Newell's Old Boys (youth)
- 2016: Newell's Old Boys (caretaker)
- 2017: Newell's Old Boys (caretaker)
- 2017–2018: Defensa y Justicia
- 2018–2019: Talleres
- 2019: Huracán
- 2020–2021: Unión La Calera
- 2021–2025: Fortaleza
- 2025–2026: Santos
- 2026: Racing Club
- 2026–: Fortaleza
- * Club domestic league appearances and goals

Juan Pablo Vojvoda Rizzo (born 13 January 1975) is an Argentine football manager and former player who played as a central defender. He is the current head coach of Brazilian club Fortaleza.

== Playing career ==
Born in General Baldissera but raised in Cruz Alta, Vojvoda joined Newell's Old Boys' youth setup at the age of 14. He made his senior debut with the main squad in 1995, and went on to feature regularly in the following seven seasons, never establishing himself as a regular starter.

In 2002 Vojvoda moved abroad, after signing for Segunda División side SD Compostela on loan for one year. He stayed in the country for the following six seasons, representing Algeciras CF, Cultural y Deportiva Leonesa and CD Baza.

Vojvoda returned to his home country on 15 July 2009, joining Tiro Federal of the Primera B Nacional. He subsequently played for Sportivo Belgrano and Sarmiento de Leones, retiring with the latter in 2013 at the age of 38.

== Managerial career ==
=== Newell's Old Boys ===
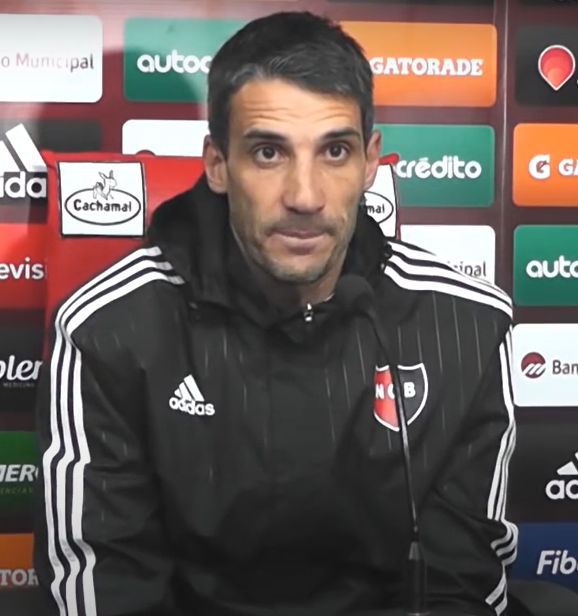
Vojvoda during a press conference with Newell's Old Boys in 2016

Shortly after retiring, Vojvoda took up coaching, being in charge of the youth categories of his first club, Newell's. On 10 July 2015, he was named manager of the club's reserve side. He was also an interim manager of the first team for two occasions: in 2016 and in 2017.

=== Defensa y Justicia ===
On 7 October 2017, Vojvoda was named manager of Defensa y Justicia. He left the club on 28 May 2018, after receiving an offer from fellow league team Talleres de Córdoba.

=== Talleres de Córdoba ===
Vojvoda was announced as manager of Talleres on 28 May 2018, just hours after leaving Defensa. On 23 May 2019, he agreed to leave the club on a mutual agreement.

=== Huracán ===
In May 2019, Vojvoda was appointed manager of Club Atlético Huracán for the 2019–20 season. He was sacked on 15 September, after a 4–0 loss to River Plate and only one win in seven matches.

=== Unión La Calera ===
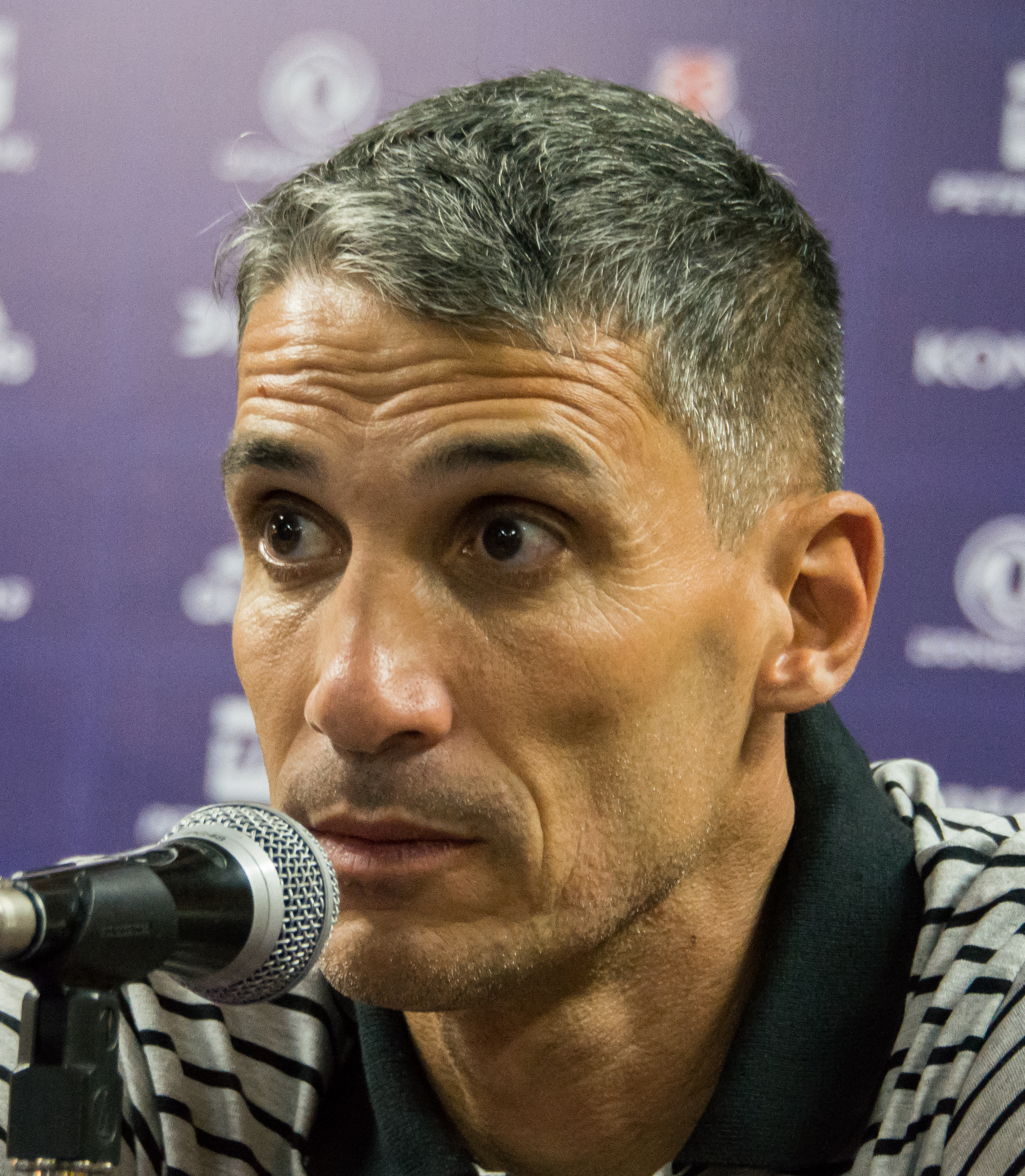
Vojvoda during a press conference with Unión La Calera in 2020

Vojvoda took over the Chilean Primera División side Unión La Calera on 30 December 2019. He led the club to the second position of the 2020 Chilean Primera División, qualifying the club to the Copa Libertadores for the first time in their history.

On 18 February 2021, Vojvoda left La Calera by mutual agreement.

=== Fortaleza ===
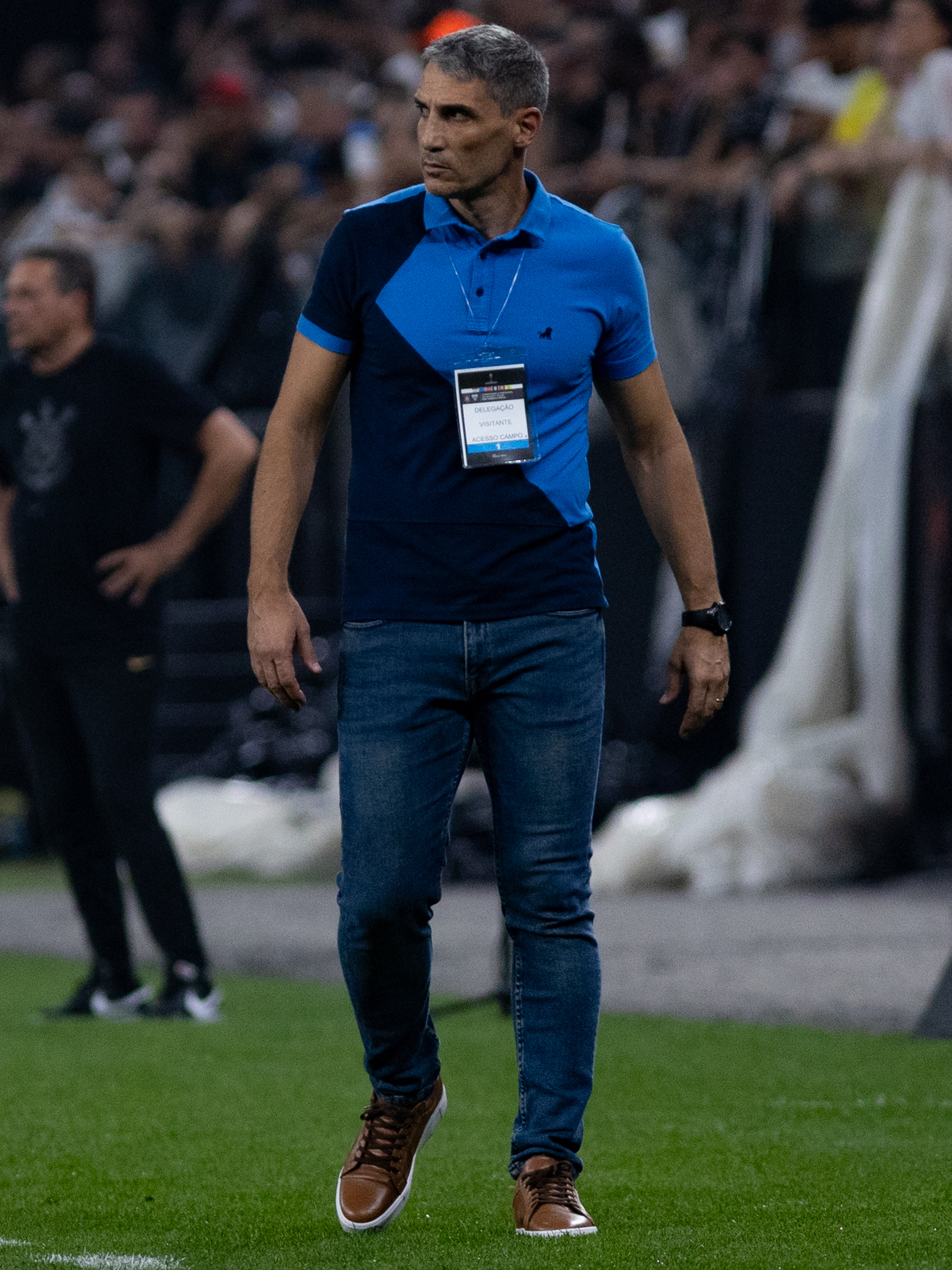
Vojvoda coaching Fortaleza in 2023

On 4 May 2021, Vojvoda was appointed head coach of Campeonato Brasileiro Série A club Fortaleza. He won the first title of his career late in the month, as the club defeated rivals Ceará to lift the 2021 Campeonato Cearense.

Vojvoda led Fortaleza to their first ever qualification to the Copa Libertadores, after finishing in an impressive fourth position in the 2021 Série A. He lifted a second consecutive title of the Cearense in 2022, and also won the year's Copa do Nordeste.

Vojvoda led Fortaleza to a second consecutive Libertadores qualification after finishing eighth in the 2022 Série A, despite ending the first round of the tournament in last position. He renewed his contract with the club until 2024 on 18 November 2022, and won the 2023 Campeonato Cearense, his fourth accolade while in charge of Leão.

On 14 July 2025, Vojvoda was sacked from Fortaleza after a nine-winless match run.

=== Santos ===
On 22 August 2025, Vojvoda was announced as head coach of fellow Brazilian top-tier side Santos on a contract until December 2026. He avoided relegation with the club, but was sacked on 19 March 2026, hours after a 2–1 home loss to Internacional which led him to a run of seven winless matches.

=== Racing Club ===
On 22 June 2026, Vojvoda was presented as manager of Racing Club back in his home country, replacing Gustavo Costas. On 28 September, however, he left by mutual consent.

=== Fortaleza return ===
On 10 November 2026, Vojvoda returned to Fortaleza, now in the Série B, for the remaining three matches of the year; he accepted the short-term deal without the costs of a salary.

== Personal life ==
Born in Argentina, Vojvoda is of Croatian and Italian descent and holds an Italian passport.

== Career statistics ==
Appearances and goals by club, season and competition
| Club | Season | League | | | Cup | | Continental | | Other | | Total | |
| Club | Season | Division | Apps | Goals | Apps | Goals | Apps | Goals | Apps | Goals | Apps | Goals |
|---|---|---|---|---|---|---|---|---|---|---|---|---|
| Newell's Old Boys | 1995–96 | Argentine Primera División | 8 | 0 | — | | — | | — | | 8 | 0 |
| Newell's Old Boys | 1996–97 | Argentine Primera División | 8 | 0 | — | | — | | — | | 8 | 0 |
| Newell's Old Boys | 1997–98 | Argentine Primera División | 20 | 0 | — | | — | | — | | 20 | 0 |
| Newell's Old Boys | 1998–99 | Argentine Primera División | 24 | 1 | — | | — | | — | | 24 | 1 |
| Newell's Old Boys | 1999–2000 | Argentine Primera División | 19 | 2 | — | | — | | — | | 19 | 2 |
| Newell's Old Boys | 2000–01 | Argentine Primera División | 25 | 1 | — | | — | | — | | 25 | 1 |
| Newell's Old Boys | 2001–02 | Argentine Primera División | 22 | 0 | — | | — | | — | | 22 | 0 |
| Newell's Old Boys | Total | | 126 | 4 | 0 | 0 | 0 | 0 | 0 | 0 | 126 | 4 |
| Compostela (loan) | 2002–03 | Segunda División | 28 | 0 | 1 | 0 | — | | — | | 29 | 0 |
| Algeciras | 2003–04 | Segunda División | 21 | 0 | 1 | 0 | — | | — | | 22 | 0 |
| Algeciras | 2004–05 | Segunda División B | 34 | 0 | 1 | 0 | — | | — | | 35 | 0 |
| Algeciras | Total | | 55 | 0 | 2 | 0 | 0 | 0 | 0 | 0 | 57 | 0 |
| Cultural Leonesa | 2005–06 | Segunda División B | 32 | 0 | — | | — | | — | | 32 | 0 |
| Baza | 2006–07 | Segunda División B | 34 | 2 | — | | — | | — | | 34 | 2 |
| Baza | 2007–08 | Segunda División B | 35 | 0 | — | | — | | 2 (Note: Appearance(s) in relegation play-offs) | 0 | 37 | 0 |
| Baza | 2008–09 | Tercera División | 37 | 9 | — | | — | | — | | 37 | 9 |
| Baza | Total | | 106 | 11 | 0 | 0 | 0 | 0 | 2 | 0 | 108 | 11 |
| Tiro Federal | 2009–10 | Primera B Nacional | 34 | 0 | — | | — | | — | | 34 | 0 |
| Sportivo Belgrano | 2010–11 | Torneo Argentino A | 44 | 0 | — | | — | | — | | 44 | 0 |
| Sportivo Belgrano | 2011–12 | Torneo Argentino A | 36 | 1 | 2 | 0 | — | | — | | 38 | 1 |
| Sportivo Belgrano | Total | | 80 | 1 | 2 | 0 | 0 | 0 | 0 | 0 | 82 | 1 |
| Sarmiento de Leones | 2012–13 | Torneo Argentino B | 24 | 1 | — | | — | | — | | 24 | 1 |
| Career total | | | 485 | 17 | 5 | 0 | 0 | 0 | 2 | 0 | 492 | 17 |

== Managerial statistics ==
As of 12 November 2026

Managerial record by team and tenure
| Team | Nat | From | To | Record | | | | | | | | Ref. |
| Team | Nat | From | To | G | W | D | L | GF | GA | GD | Win % | Ref. |
|---|---|---|---|---|---|---|---|---|---|---|---|---|
| Newell's Old Boys (caretaker) | (Argentina) | 16 February 2016 | 22 February 2016 | 2 | 1 | 0 | 1 | 6 | 4 | +2 | 50.00 | |
| Newell's Old Boys (caretaker) | (Argentina) | 4 June 2017 | 27 June 2017 | 7 | 0 | 4 | 3 | 2 | 6 | −4 | 0.00 | |
| Defensa y Justicia | (Argentina) | 12 October 2017 | 30 June 2018 | 25 | 14 | 3 | 8 | 38 | 25 | +13 | 56.00 | |
| Talleres | (Argentina) | 1 July 2018 | 23 May 2019 | 36 | 14 | 8 | 14 | 45 | 36 | +9 | 38.89 | |
| Huracán | (Argentina) | 1 June 2019 | 15 September 2019 | 7 | 1 | 3 | 3 | 5 | 10 | −5 | 14.29 | |
| Unión La Calera | (Chile) | 1 January 2020 | 18 February 2021 | 41 | 18 | 10 | 13 | 69 | 50 | +19 | 43.90 | |
| Fortaleza | (Brazil) | 5 May 2021 | 14 July 2025 | 310 | 145 | 77 | 88 | 476 | 316 | +160 | 46.77 | |
| Santos | (Brazil) | 22 August 2025 | 19 March 2026 | 34 | 10 | 14 | 10 | 48 | 41 | +7 | 29.41 | |
| Racing Club | (Argentina) | 22 June 2026 | 28 September 2026 | 13 | 4 | 2 | 7 | 18 | 20 | −2 | 30.77 | |
| Fortaleza | (Brazil) | 11 November 2026 | present | 0 | 0 | 0 | 0 | 0 | 0 | +0 | — | |
| Total | | | | 475 | 207 | 121 | 147 | 707 | 508 | +199 | 43.58 | — |

== Honours ==
=== Manager ===
Fortaleza

- Campeonato Cearense: 2021, 2022, 2023
- Copa do Nordeste: 2022, 2024
