= Ancelmo Júnior =

Brazilian footballer (born 1990)

Personal information
- Full name: Ancelmo de Holanda Bessa Júnior
- Date of birth: 3 April 1990 (age 36)
- Place of birth: Rio Branco, Brazil
- Height: 1.80 m (5 ft 11 in)
- Position: Attacking midfielder

Youth career
- 2009: Independência
- 2010: Rio Branco

Senior career*
Years	Team	Apps	(Gls)
2010–2011	Rio Branco	5	(1)
2011	Guarani	12	(1)
2012	AC Juventus	0	(0)
2012	Mixto	0	(0)
2013	XV de Piracicaba	0	(0)
2013	Metropolitano	0	(0)
2014	Galícia	14	(4)
2014	Bragantino	1	(0)
2014−2016	Boavista	3	(0)
2017	Rio Branco	4	(0)
2018	Atlético Acreano	5	(0)
2019	Altos	5	(1)
2020	Moto Club		
2020	Juventude-MA		
2021	Treze	2 (Note: Details of Treze appearances in 2021 Campeonato Paraibano:)	(0)
- * Club domestic league appearances and goals as of 09:53, 13 May 2021 (UTC)

Ancelmo de Holanda Bessa Júnior (born 3 April 1990) is a Brazilian professional football player who most recently played for Treze as an attacking midfielder.

== Career ==
Born in Rio Branco, Júnior is a youth prospect of Independência and Rio Branco, which he later debuted in the Campeonato Paulista. He then changed teams often, representing five in less than 2 years.

Júnior had a try-out at Atlético Paranaense in February 2013, but was not offered a contract. He had a short spell at Galícia and played briefly in Brazilian second tier for Bragantino in May 2014.

On 19 July 2014, Júnior joined Boavista in Portuguese first tier, but played only seven games across two seasons, being released on 30 May 2016.

Ancelmo Júnior signed for Treze for the 2021 season. He was released from his contract on 28 April 2021.
