= 2022 Copa do Nordeste =

Tournament details
- Country: Brazil
- Dates: 22 January – 3 April
- Teams: 16

Final positions
- Champions: Fortaleza (2nd title)
- Runners-up: Sport
- 2023 Copa do Brasil: Sport

Tournament statistics
- Matches played: 72
- Goals scored: 172 (2.39 per match)
- Top goal scorer: Hugo Rodallega (8 goals)

Awards
- Best player: Mailson

The 2022 Copa do Nordeste was the 19th edition of the main football tournament featuring teams from the Brazilian Northeast Region. The competition featured 16 clubs, with Bahia, Ceará and Pernambuco having two seeds each, and Alagoas, Maranhão, Paraíba, Piauí, Rio Grande do Norte and Sergipe with one seed each. Four teams were decided by a qualifying tournament (Eliminatórias Copa do Nordeste 2022). The Copa do Nordeste began on 22 January and ended on 3 April 2022. Bahia were the defending champions, but were eliminated in the group stage.

Fortaleza defeated Sport 2–1 on aggregate in the finals to win their second title. As champions, Fortaleza would qualify for the third round of the 2023 Copa do Brasil, but they qualified for the Copa do Brasil as Série A 8th place. Therefore, the Copa do Nordeste berth was awarded to the runners-up Sport.

== Format ==
In this season, 12 teams (9 state league champions and best placed teams in the 2021 CBF ranking from Ceará, Bahia and Pernambuco) gained direct entries into the group stage while the other four berths were decided by the Eliminatórias Copa do Nordeste.

For the group stage, the 16 teams were drawn into two groups. Each team played once against the eight clubs from the other group. Top four teams qualified for the final stages. Quarter-finals and semi-finals were played on a single-leg basis and finals were played on a home-and-away two-legged basis.

== Qualification ==
The 2022 Copa do Nordeste qualification (officially the Eliminatórias Copa do Nordeste 2022) was the qualifying tournament of the 2022 Copa do Nordeste. It was played from 12 October to 18 November 2021. Twenty-four teams competed to decide four places in the Copa do Nordeste. The teams entered in three rounds where the four winners advanced to the Copa do Nordeste.

The winners were CRB (Alagoas), Floresta (Ceará), Sousa and Botafogo-PB (Paraíba).

== Teams ==
The qualified teams were

Association	Team	Qualification method
(Alagoas) Alagoas; 1 + 1 berths	CSA	2021 Campeonato Alagoano champions
(Alagoas) Alagoas; 1 + 1 berths	CRB	2022 Copa do Nordeste qualification
(Bahia) Bahia; 2 berths	Atlético de Alagoinhas	2021 Campeonato Baiano champions
(Bahia) Bahia; 2 berths	Bahia	best placed team in the 2021 CBF ranking not already qualified
(Ceará) Ceará; 2 + 1 berths	Fortaleza	2021 Campeonato Cearense champions
(Ceará) Ceará; 2 + 1 berths	Ceará	best placed team in the 2021 CBF ranking not already qualified
(Ceará) Ceará; 2 + 1 berths	Floresta	2022 Copa do Nordeste qualification
(Maranhão) Maranhão; 1 berth	Sampaio Corrêa	2021 Campeonato Maranhense champions
(Paraíba) Paraíba; 1 + 2 berths	Campinense	2021 Campeonato Paraibano champions
(Paraíba) Paraíba; 1 + 2 berths	Botafogo-PB	2022 Copa do Nordeste qualification
(Paraíba) Paraíba; 1 + 2 berths	Sousa	2022 Copa do Nordeste qualification
(Pernambuco) Pernambuco; 2 berths	Náutico	2021 Campeonato Pernambucano champions
(Pernambuco) Pernambuco; 2 berths	Sport	best placed team in the 2021 CBF ranking not already qualified
(Piauí) Piauí; 1 berth	Altos	2021 Campeonato Piauiense champions
(Rio Grande do Norte) Rio Grande do Norte; 1 berth	Globo	2021 Campeonato Potiguar champions
(Sergipe) Sergipe; 1 berth	Sergipe	2021 Campeonato Sergipano champions

== Schedule ==
The schedule of the competition was as follows.

Stage	First leg	Second leg
Group Stage	Round 1: 22 January–2 March	
Group Stage	Round 2: 29 January–10 March	
Group Stage	Round 3: 5–9 February	
Group Stage	Round 4: 12–27 February	
Group Stage	Round 5: 15–17 February	
Group Stage	Round 6: 19–24 February	
Group Stage	Round 7: 5–6 March	
Group Stage	Round 8: 19 March	
Quarter-finals	22–24 March	
Semi-finals	26–27 March	
Finals	31 March	3 April

== Draw ==
The draw for the group stage was held on 6 December 2021, 11:00, at the CBF headquarters in Rio de Janeiro. The 16 teams were drawn into two groups of eight containing two teams from each of the four pots with the restriction that teams from the same federation (except Floresta and Sousa) could not be drawn into the same group. Teams were seeded by their 2021 CBF ranking (shown in parentheses).

Group stage draw
Pot 1	Pot 2	Pot 3	Pot 4
Bahia (11); Ceará (14); (Ceará) Fortaleza (18); (Pernambuco) Sport (20)	(Alagoas) CSA (30); (Alagoas) CRB (31); (Maranhão) Sampaio Corrêa (33); (Pernambuco) Náutico (39)	(Paraíba) Botafogo-PB (49); (Rio Grande do Norte) Globo (62); (Piauí) Altos (68); (Paraíba) Campinense (72)	(Ceará) Floresta (91); Sergipe (102); (Bahia) Atlético de Alagoinhas (137); (Paraíba) Sousa (192)

== Group stage ==
For the group stage, the 16 teams were drawn into two groups of eight teams each. Each team played on a single round-robin tournament against the eight clubs from the other group. The top four teams of each group advanced to the quarter-finals of the knockout stages. The teams were ranked according to points (3 points for a win, 1 point for a draw, and 0 points for a loss). If tied on points, the following criteria would be used to determine the ranking: 1. Wins; 2. Goal difference; 3. Goals scored; 4. Fewest red cards; 5. Fewest yellow cards; 6. Draw in the headquarters of the Brazilian Football Confederation (Regulations Article 13).

=== Group A ===
Pos	Team	Pld	W	D	L	GF	GA	GD	Pts	Qualification
1	(Ceará) Fortaleza	8	4	4	0	17	6	+11	16	Advance to Quarter-finals
2	(Alagoas) CSA	8	4	2	2	13	6	+7	14	Advance to Quarter-finals
3	(Pernambuco) Sport	8	4	2	2	10	6	+4	14	Advance to Quarter-finals
4	(Bahia) Atlético de Alagoinhas	8	3	2	3	6	8	−2	11	Advance to Quarter-finals
5	(Maranhão) Sampaio Corrêa	8	2	1	5	8	11	−3	7	
6	(Paraíba) Campinense	8	1	3	4	8	12	−4	6	
7	(Rio Grande do Norte) Globo	8	1	2	5	4	21	−17	5	
8	Sergipe	8	0	1	7	3	16	−13	1	

Source: CBF

=== Group B ===
Pos	Team	Pld	W	D	L	GF	GA	GD	Pts	Qualification
1	Ceará	8	5	3	0	12	2	+10	18	Advance to Quarter-finals
2	(Paraíba) Botafogo-PB	8	4	3	1	10	6	+4	15	Advance to Quarter-finals
3	(Pernambuco) Náutico	8	4	2	2	14	8	+6	14	Advance to Quarter-finals
4	(Alagoas) CRB	8	4	2	2	8	6	+2	14	Advance to Quarter-finals
5	Bahia	8	4	1	3	18	11	+7	13	
6	(Paraíba) Sousa	8	3	2	3	10	11	−1	11	
7	(Piauí) Altos	8	2	3	3	7	9	−2	9	
8	(Ceará) Floresta	8	2	1	5	7	16	−9	7	

Source: CBF

=== Results ===
Home \ Away	ALT	BAH	BOT	CEA	CRB	FLO	NAU	SOU
(Bahia) Atlético de Alagoinhas		2–1		0–1	1–0			0–0
(Paraíba) Campinense		1–3		0–1	1–1			2–1
(Alagoas) CSA	3–0		3–0			2–0	3–1	
(Ceará) Fortaleza		3–1		1–1	2–0			5–0
(Rio Grande do Norte) Globo	1–0		1–1			1–1	0–2	
(Maranhão) Sampaio Corrêa	2–1		0–2			3–0	0–1	
Sergipe	1–3	1–3		0–1	1–2			
(Pernambuco) Sport			0–1			3–0	3–2	1–0

Home \ Away	ATL	CAM	CSA	FOR	GLO	SAM	SER	SPO
(Piauí) Altos	1–1	1–0		1–1				0–0
Bahia			1–1		5–0	2–0		2–3
(Paraíba) Botafogo-PB	1–0	1–1		1–1			3–0	
Ceará			2–0		5–0	1–1		0–0
(Alagoas) CRB			1–1		2–0	1–0		1–0
(Ceará) Floresta	1–2	4–3		0–2			1–0	
(Pernambuco) Náutico	3–0	0–0		2–2			3–0	
(Paraíba) Sousa			1–0		5–1	3–2	0–0	

Source:CBF
Legend: Blue = home team win; Yellow = draw; Red = away team win.

== Final stages ==
Starting from the quarter-finals, the teams played a single-elimination tournament with the following rules:

- Quarter-finals and semi-finals were played on a single-leg basis, with the higher-seeded team hosting the leg.
  - If tied, the penalty shoot-out would be used to determine the winners (Regulations Article 17).
- Finals were played on a home-and-away two-legged basis, with the higher-seeded team hosting the second leg.
  - If tied on aggregate, the penalty shoot-out would be used to determine the winners (Regulations Article 17).
- Extra time was not played and away goals rule was not used in final stages.

Starting from the semi-finals, the teams were seeded according to their performance in the tournament. The teams were ranked according to overall points. If tied on overall points, the following criteria would be used to determine the ranking: 1. Overall wins; 2. Overall goal difference; 3. Overall goals scored; 4. Fewest red cards in the tournament; 5. Fewest yellow cards in the tournament; 6. Draw in the headquarters of the Brazilian Football Confederation (Regulations Article 18).

=== Bracket ===
Quarter-finals
(Alagoas)	CSA	0 (1)
(Pernambuco)	Sport (p)	0 (3)
(Ceará)	Ceará	0 (3)
(Alagoas)	CRB (p)	0 (4)
(Ceará)	Fortaleza	5
(Bahia)	Atlético de Alagoinhas	1
(Paraíba)	Botafogo-PB	1 (3)
(Pernambuco)	Náutico (p)	1 (4)

Semi-finals
(Pernambuco)	Sport	3
(Alagoas)	CRB	1
(Ceará)	Fortaleza	2
(Pernambuco)	Náutico	0

Finals
(Pernambuco)	Sport	1	0	1
(Ceará)	Fortaleza	1	1	2

=== Quarter-finals ===
Team 1	Score	Team 2
Fortaleza (Ceará)	5–1	(Bahia) Atlético de Alagoinhas
Botafogo-PB (Paraíba)	1–1 (3–4 p)	(Pernambuco) Náutico
Ceará	0–0 (3–4 p)	(Alagoas) CRB
CSA (Alagoas)	0–0 (1–3 p)	(Pernambuco) Sport

==== Group C ====
22 March 2022
21:35

Fortaleza (Ceará)	5–1	(Bahia) Atlético de Alagoinhas
Renato Kayzer 29', 57'; Moisés 52'; Romero 80'; Hércules 90+2'	Report	Cesinha 1'

Castelão, Fortaleza
Attendance: 12,946
Referee: Fábio Augusto Santos Sá Júnior (Sergipe)

==== Group D ====
23 March 2022
20:00

Botafogo-PB (Paraíba)	1–1	(Pernambuco) Náutico
Leilson 71'	Report	Júnior Tavares 88'
Penalties
Gustavo Coutinho (penalty scored); Leilson (penalty scored); Ratinho (penalty missed); Adilson Bahia (penalty scored); Bruno Ré (penalty missed)	3–4	(penalty scored) Pedro Vitor; (penalty scored) Hereda; (penalty scored) Amarildo; (penalty missed) Juninho Carpina; (penalty scored) Júnior Tavares

Almeidão, João Pessoa
Attendance: 6,206
Referee: Marcelo de Lima Henrique (Ceará)

==== Group E ====
24 March 2022
19:00

Ceará	0–0	(Alagoas) CRB
	Report
Penalties
Mendoza (penalty scored); Rodrigo Lindoso (penalty missed); Erick (penalty scored); Dentinho (penalty missed); Zé Roberto (penalty scored); Nino Paraíba (penalty missed)	3–4	(penalty missed) Maicon; (penalty missed) Anselmo Ramon; (penalty scored) Yago; (penalty scored) Gum; (penalty scored) Diogo Silva; (penalty scored) Raul Prata

Castelão, Fortaleza
Attendance: 24,492
Referee: Diego Pombo Lopez (Bahia)

==== Group F ====
22 March 2022
21:35

CSA (Alagoas)	0–0	(Pernambuco) Sport
	Report
Penalties
Osvaldo (penalty scored); Wellington Nascimento (penalty missed); Gabriel (penalty missed); Rodrigo Rodrigues (penalty missed)	1–3	(penalty scored) Ronaldo; (penalty scored) Vanegas; (penalty scored) Cáceres

Estádio Rei Pelé, Maceió
Attendance: 8,616
Referee: Antônio Dib Moraes de Sousa (Piauí)

=== Semi-finals ===
Pos	Team	Pld	W	D	L	GF	GA	GD	Pts	Host
1	(Ceará) Fortaleza	9	5	4	0	22	7	+15	19	Host
2	(Pernambuco) Náutico	9	4	3	2	15	9	+6	15	
3	(Pernambuco) Sport	9	4	3	2	10	6	+4	15	Host
4	(Alagoas) CRB	9	4	3	2	8	6	+2	15	

Source: CBF

Team 1	Score	Team 2
Fortaleza (Ceará)	2–0	(Pernambuco) Náutico
Sport (Pernambuco)	3–1	(Alagoas) CRB

==== Group G ====
26 March 2022
17:45

Fortaleza (Ceará)	2–0	(Pernambuco) Náutico
Robson 19'; Romero 88'	Report

Castelão, Fortaleza
Attendance: 31,681
Referee: Dênis da Silva Ribeiro Serafim (Alagoas)

==== Group H ====
27 March 2022
18:30

Sport (Pernambuco)	3–1	(Alagoas) CRB
Parraguez 14', 21'; Luciano Juba 82'	Report	Anselmo Ramon 75'

Arena Pernambuco, São Lourenço da Mata
Attendance: 22,483
Referee: Zandick Gondim Alves Júnior (Rio Grande do Norte)

=== Finals ===
Pos	Team	Pld	W	D	L	GF	GA	GD	Pts	Host
1	(Ceará) Fortaleza	10	6	4	0	24	7	+17	22	2nd leg
2	(Pernambuco) Sport	10	5	3	2	13	7	+6	18	1st leg

Source: CBF

Team 1	Agg.	Team 2	1st leg	2nd leg
Sport (Pernambuco)	1–2	(Ceará) Fortaleza	1–1	0–1

==== Group I ====
31 March 2022
21:35

Sport (Pernambuco)	1–1	(Ceará) Fortaleza
Bill 90+1'	Report	Zé Welison 84'

Arena Pernambuco, São Lourenço da Mata
Attendance: 42,544
Referee: Antônio Dib Moraes de Sousa (Piauí)

3 April 2022
18:30

Fortaleza (Ceará)	1–0	(Pernambuco) Sport
Yago Pikachu 45+2' (pen.)	Report

Castelão, Fortaleza
Attendance: 60,045
Referee: Marielson Alves Silva (Bahia)

2022 Copa do Nordeste
Champions

Fortaleza
2nd title

== Top goalscorers ==
Rank	Player	Team	Goals
1	(Colombia) Hugo Rodallega	Bahia	8
2	(Brazil) Anselmo Ramon	(Alagoas) CRB	4
2	(Brazil) Gabriel Poveda	(Maranhão) Sampaio Corrêa	4
2	(Brazil) Gustavo Coutinho	(Paraíba) Botafogo-PB	4
2	(Brazil) Robinho	(Pernambuco) Náutico	4
2	(Brazil) Yago Pikachu	(Ceará) Fortaleza	4

Source:CBF

== 2022 Copa do Nordeste team ==
The 2022 Copa do Nordeste team was a squad consisting of the eleven most impressive players at the tournament.

Pos.	Player	Team
GK	(Brazil) Mailson ^{a}	(Pernambuco) Sport
DF	(Brazil) Yago Pikachu	(Ceará) Fortaleza
DF	(Brazil) Marcelo Benevenuto	(Ceará) Fortaleza
DF	(Brazil) Rafael Thyere	(Pernambuco) Sport
DF	(Brazil) Luciano Juba	(Pernambuco) Sport
MF	(Brazil) Matheus Jussa	(Ceará) Fortaleza
MF	(Brazil) Ronaldo	(Pernambuco) Sport
MF	(Brazil) Vina	Ceará
MF	(Brazil) Lucas Crispim	(Ceará) Fortaleza
FW	(Colombia) Hugo Rodallega ^{b}	Bahia
FW	(Chile) Javier Parraguez	(Pernambuco) Sport
Head coach	(Argentina) Juan Pablo Vojvoda	(Ceará) Fortaleza

a. Best player
b. Top scorer

Head coach
(Argentina) Vojvoda
