= Marcos Juárez Department =

Marcos Juárez Department Departamento Marcos Juárez
- Department
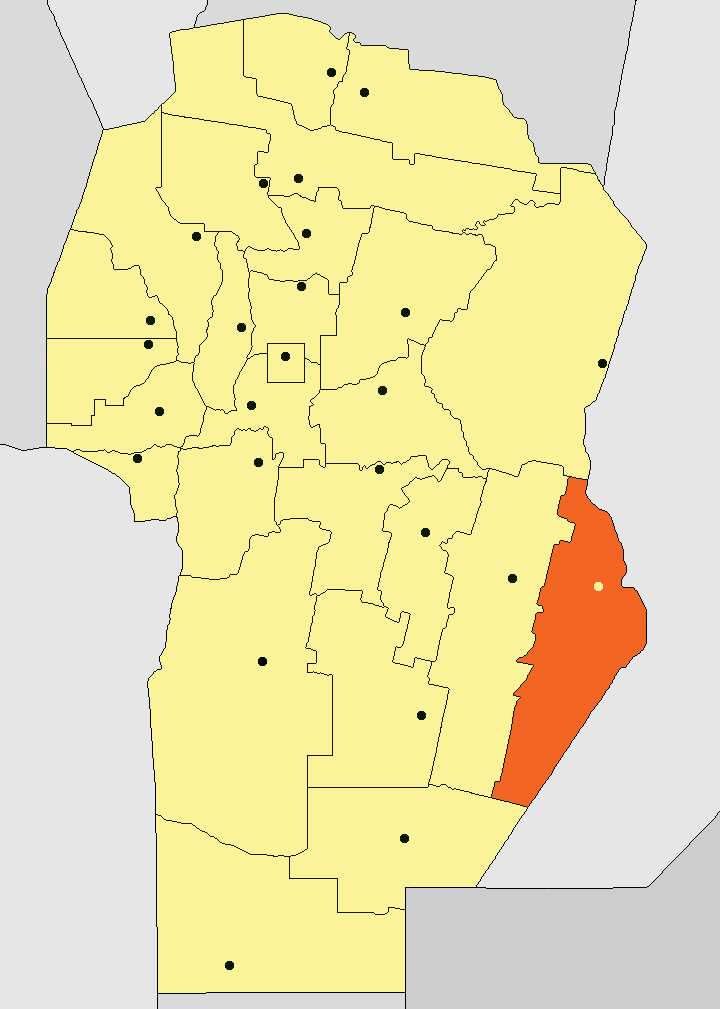
- Location of Marcos Juárez Department in Córdoba Province
- Coordinates: 32°42′S 62°02′W
- Country: Argentina
- Province: Córdoba
- Foundation: 16 November 1888
- Founder: provincial law
- Capital: Marcos Juárez

Area
  - Total: 9,490 km^{2} (3,660 sq mi)

Population (2001 census [INDEC])
  - Total: 99,761
  - Density: 10.5/km^{2} (27.2/sq mi)
  - Pop. change (1991-2001): +2.22%
- Time zone: UTC-3 (ART)
- Postal code: X2580
- Dialing code: 03472
- Distances to
- Buenos Aires: 450 km (280 mi)
- Córdoba: 265 km (165 mi)

Marcos Juárez Department is a department of Córdoba Province in Argentina.

The provincial subdivision has a population of about 99,761 inhabitants in an area of 9,490 km², and its capital city is Marcos Juárez, which is located around 450 km from Capital Federal.

== Settlements ==
- Alejo Ledesma
- Arias
- Camilo Aldao
- Capitán General Bernardo O'Higgins
- Cavanagh
- Colonia Barge
- Colonia Italiana
- Corral de Bustos
- Cruz Alta
- General Baldissera
- General Roca
- Guatimozín
- Inriville
- Isla Verde
- Leones
- Los Surgentes
- Marcos Juárez
- Monte Buey
- Saira
- Saladillo
- Villa Elisa
