= General Baldissera =

- Town
- Location of General Baldissera in Argentina
- Coordinates: 33°17′S 62°11′W
- Country: Argentina
- Province: Córdoba
- Department: Marcos Juárez

Government
  - Intendant: Lucas Perassi
- Elevation: 124 m (407 ft)

Population
  - Total: 2,133
- Time zone: UTC−3 (ART)
- CPA base: X2583
- Dialing code: +54 3468

General Baldissera is a town in Córdoba Province, Argentina. Situated in Marcos Juárez Department it has 2,133 inhabitants according to the 2001 census. It lies on Provincial Route RP E58, at 320 km (199 mi) from the provincial capital and 530 km (329 mi) from Buenos Aires.

The area's economy is mainly based in agriculture and cattle raising.

== Notable people ==
- Ignacio Piatti, football player
- Juan Pablo Vojvoda, football manager
