= Rogerinho (footballer, born 1996) =

Brazilian footballer

Personal information
- Full name: Rogério Joséda Silva
- Date of birth: 4 January 1996 (age 30)
- Place of birth: Jaboatão dos Guararapes, Brazil
- Height: 1.69 m (5 ft 6 1/2 in)
- Position: Forward

Youth career
- 2015: Náutico

Senior career*
Years	Team	Apps	(Gls)
2016–2018	Náutico	4	(0)
2017	→ Belo Jardim (loan)	16	(3)
2017	→ Bangu (loan)	3	(2)
2019	Passo Fundo	9	(0)
2019	Ipojuca	4	(2)
2019	Força e Luz	6 (Note: Details of Força e Luz appearances:)	(2)
2020	Atlético Cearense	9	(0)
2020	→ América-RN (loan)	0	(0)
2020	→ Crato (loan)	4	(0)
2021	Treze	1 (Note: Details of Treze appearance in 2021 Campeonato Paraibano:)	(0)
- * Club domestic league appearances and goals as of 09:49, 13 May 2021 (UTC)

Rogério Joséda Silva, commonly known as Rogerinho, is a Brazilian footballer who most recently played as a forward for Treze. He represented Náutico in the 2016 Campeonato Brasileiro Série B.

== Career ==
Rogerinho came through the youth system at Náutico. He was promoted to the first team in 2016, and made his senior debut in the Campeonato Brasileiro Série B game against Criciúma on 20 August 2016, coming on as a second half substitute. After not being used by the senior side in the latter part of the season, he was loaned out twice in 2017: firstly to Belo Jardim for the Campeonato Pernambucano and then to Bangu for 2017 Campeonato Brasileiro Série D. He returned to Náutico for the 2018 season, featuring in the Campeonato Pernambucano and Copa do Nordeste.

After leaving Náutico at the end of 2018, Rogerinho spent 2019 at clubs in the second division of Campeonato Gaúcho and Campeonato Pernambuco; initially with Passo Fundo in January, then with Ipojuca in April and finally with Força e Luz in October.

Signed by Atlético Cearense at the start of 2020, he was loaned to América-RN on a three-month deal just before the COVID-19 pandemic in Brazil brought a halt to competitions. He was able to represent the club in just one fixture, the final group game of the 2020 Copa do Nordeste in July 2020, before returning to Atlético Cearense. As part of a deal between the two clubs, he was one of sixteen players loaned to Crato for the second division of Campeonato Cearense in October 2020.

In January 2021, Rogerinho signed for Treze. He was released from the club on 30 April 2021.
