= 2021 Campeonato Paraibano =

111th edition of Paraíba's football league

Campeonato Paraibano de Futebol
- Season: 2021
- Dates: 14 April 2021 – 20 June 2021
- Champions: Campinense
- Relegated: Perilima
- 2022 Copa do Brasil: Campinense; Sousa
- 2022 Série D: subject to outcome of 2021 Série D
- 2022 Copa do Nordeste: Campinense; Sousa; Botafogo-PB (via RNC); Treze (via RNC)
- Matches: 34
- Goals: 64 (1.88 per match)
- Top goalscorer: 5 goals Birungueta, Treze
- Biggest home win: Botafogo-PB 5–0 Atlético Cajazeirense; Round 7, 23 May 2021
- Biggest away win: Perilima 1–4 Atlético Cajazeirense; Round 5, 15 May
- Highest scoring: Campinense 4–3 Perilima; Round 4, 8 May 2021
- Longest winning run: 5 (Sousa)
- Longest unbeaten run: 8 (Botafogo-PB)
- Longest winless run: 7 (Perilima; Nacional de Patos)
- Longest losing run: 2 (Perilima)
- All statistics correct as of 09:34, 3 June 2021 (UTC).

The 2021 Campeonato Paraibano de Futebol was the 111th edition of Paraíba's top professional football league. The competition was originally scheduled to begin on 17 March and end on 26 May, but the start was first postponed to 31 March due to clashes with other competitions, and then further postponed to 14 April due to the state government enforcing closure of stadiums in an attempt to halt the spread of COVID-19. The end date was eventually fixed for 20 June, as the final had to be scheduled around other competitions.

Treze were defending champions, after winning the 2020 final against Campinense.

== Format ==
The competition format differed from recent seasons, due to the CBF releasing fewer dates for the competition, because of the late running of the 2020 season. The competition was divided into a number of stages. No teams were promoted to the competition, as the second division did not take place in 2020. Therefore the competition ran with just eight teams.

In the first phase, the eight teams played each other once. The top two clubs in the resulting table qualified directly for the semi-finals, whilst the clubs placed third to sixth qualified for the second stage.

In the second phase, the third placed club in the first phase played the sixth placed club, and the fourth placed club played the fifth placed club, in a single match, with the highest placed club having home advantage. The winners of the two matches qualified for the semi-finals.

In the semi-final, the first placed club in the first phase played against the winner of the fourth placed v fifth placed game in the second phase. The second placed club in the first phase played against the winner of the third placed v sixth placed game in the second round.

The winner of the two semi-finals played in a two-legged final.

=== Qualification ===
The two finalists qualified to participate in the 2022 Copa do Brasil and 2022 Copa do Nordeste. The two best placed teams (other than those already participating in a national league) qualified to participate in the 2022 Campeonato Brasileiro Série D.

== Participating teams ==
Club	Home city	2020 result
Atlético Cajazeirense	Cajazeiras	5th
Botafogo-PB	João Pessoa	3rd
Campinense	Campina Grande	2nd
Nacional de Patos	Patos	7th
Perilima	Campina Grande	8th
São Paulo Crystal	Cruz do Espírito Santo	6th
Sousa	Sousa	4th
Treze	Campina Grande	1st

== First phase ==
Pos	Team	Pld	W	D	L	GF	GA	GD	Pts	Qualification
1	Sousa (Q)	7	5	1	1	7	1	+6	16	Advance to semi-final stage
2	Botafogo-PB (Q)	7	4	3	0	14	5	+9	15	Advance to semi-final stage
3	Campinense (Q)	7	3	3	1	9	7	+2	12	Advance to second phase
4	Treze (Q)	7	2	2	3	7	6	+1	8	Advance to second phase
5	São Paulo Crystal (Q)	7	1	4	2	4	6	−2	7	Advance to second phase
6	Atlético Cajazeirense (Q)	7	1	3	3	8	15	−7	6	Advance to second phase
7	Nacional de Patos	7	0	4	3	5	8	−3	4	
8	Perilima (R)	7	0	4	3	8	14	−6	4	Relegated to Second Division

Rules for classification: 1) points; 2) wins; 3) goal difference; 4) number of goals scored; 5) least red cards; 6) least yellow cards.
(Q) Qualified for the phase indicated; (R) Relegated

== Second phase ==
In the second phase, the four qualifiers from the first phase played a single game, based on their finishing position in the first phase.

27 May 2021	Treze	0–0 (3–5 p)	São Paulo Crystal	Campina Grande
20:30 BRT		Report		Stadium: Amigão; Attendance: 0 Referee: Afro Rocha de Carvalho Filho
	Penalties
	Vitor (penalty scored); Fernandinho (penalty missed); Bruce (penalty scored); Marlon (penalty scored)		Leandro Cearense (penalty scored); Gustavo (penalty scored); Jailton (penalty scored); Biro Biro (penalty scored); Augusto Recife (penalty scored)

28 May 2021	Campinense	0–0 (3–1 p)	Atlético Cajazeirense	Campina Grande
20:30 BRT		Report		Stadium: Amigão; Referee: Josemarques Domingos Lins
	Penalties
	Marcelinho (penalty scored); Cleiton (penalty scored); Cláudio (penalty missed); Rafinha (penalty scored)		Renan Henrique (penalty missed); Lau (penalty scored); Diego Baiano (penalty missed); Rodrigo Sabão (penalty missed)

== Semi-finals ==
In the semi-final stage, the direct qualifiers from the first phase played a single game against the qualifiers from the second phase

1 June 2021	Sousa	1–0	São Paulo Crystal	Sousa
16:00 BRT	Roni Lobo 48'	Report		Stadium: Marizão; Attendance: 0 Referee: Afro Rocha de Carvalho Filho

2 June 2021	Botafogo-PB	0–0 (4–5 p)	Campinense	João Pessoa
20:30 BRT		Report		Stadium: Almeidão; Attendance: 0 Referee: Tiago Ramos de Oliveira
	Penalties
	Kaio Wiker (penalty missed); Fred (penalty scored); Maurinho (penalty scored); Welton Felipe (penalty scored); Gabriel Araújo (penalty scored)		Cleiton (penalty scored); Michel Bennech (penalty scored); Rafinha (penalty scored); Állefe (penalty scored); Mauro Iguatu (penalty scored)

== Final ==
The final took place over two legs, home and away, and the team with the best record in the competition had home advantage in the second leg.

17 June 2021 1st leg	Campinense	1–0	Sousa	Campina Grande
16:00 BRT	Edinho Corrêa 81'	Report		Stadium: Amigão; Attendance: 0 Referee: Afro Rocha de Carvalho Filho

20 June 2021 2nd leg	Sousa	0–0	Campinense	Sousa
10:00 BRT		Report		Stadium: Marizão; Attendance: 0 Referee: Leandro Bizzio

Campinense win 1–0 on aggregate and are 2021 Campeonato Paraibano champions.
