= Marcos Juárez =

- City

- Location of Marcos Juárez in Argentina
- Coordinates: 32°42′S 62°6′W
- Country: Argentina
- Province: Córdoba
- Department: Marcos Juárez

Government
  - Intendant: Sara Majorel (PRO)

Population (2024 census (local))
  - Total: 31,365
- Time zone: UTC−3 (ART)
- CPA base: X2580
- Dialing code: +54 3472

Marcos Juárez is a city in the province of Córdoba, Argentina. It has 31,365 inhabitants per the 2024 municipal census, and is the head town of the Marcos Juárez Department. It is located 267 km southeast from the provincial capital Córdoba, on National Route 9, near the provincial boundary with Santa Fe.

The city was the site of the 1983 World Five-pin Billiards Championship (won by Miguel Angel Borrelli of Argentina).

== Geography ==
The city is located 267 km southeast from the provincial capital Córdoba, on National Route 9, near the provincial boundary with Santa Fe.

=== Climate ===
Climate data for Marcos Juárez (1991–2020, extremes 1961–present)
| Month | Jan | Feb | Mar | Apr | May | Jun | Jul | Aug | Sep | Oct | Nov | Dec | Year |
|---|---|---|---|---|---|---|---|---|---|---|---|---|---|
| Record high °C (°F) | 42.0 (107.6) | 39.6 (103.3) | 39.0 (102.2) | 37.0 (98.6) | 32.6 (90.7) | 30.9 (87.6) | 32.1 (89.8) | 36.6 (97.9) | 36.9 (98.4) | 39.2 (102.6) | 39.4 (102.9) | 42.0 (107.6) | 42.0 (107.6) |
| Mean daily maximum °C (°F) | 30.4 (86.7) | 28.9 (84.0) | 27.9 (82.2) | 24.4 (75.9) | 20.4 (68.7) | 17.3 (63.1) | 16.8 (62.2) | 19.7 (67.5) | 22.3 (72.1) | 25.1 (77.2) | 28.1 (82.6) | 30.0 (86.0) | 24.3 (75.7) |
| Daily mean °C (°F) | 23.5 (74.3) | 22.1 (71.8) | 20.6 (69.1) | 17.2 (63.0) | 13.5 (56.3) | 10.3 (50.5) | 9.2 (48.6) | 11.3 (52.3) | 14.2 (57.6) | 17.8 (64.0) | 20.9 (69.6) | 22.9 (73.2) | 17.0 (62.6) |
| Mean daily minimum °C (°F) | 17.2 (63.0) | 16.2 (61.2) | 14.7 (58.5) | 11.7 (53.1) | 8.3 (46.9) | 4.9 (40.8) | 3.5 (38.3) | 4.8 (40.6) | 7.2 (45.0) | 11.2 (52.2) | 14.0 (57.2) | 16.1 (61.0) | 10.8 (51.4) |
| Record low °C (°F) | 7.4 (45.3) | 2.3 (36.1) | 0.4 (32.7) | −2.5 (27.5) | −5.8 (21.6) | −10.0 (14.0) | −10.2 (13.6) | −9.0 (15.8) | −6.7 (19.9) | −2.4 (27.7) | 0.8 (33.4) | 3.7 (38.7) | −10.2 (13.6) |
| Average precipitation mm (inches) | 114.4 (4.50) | 118.9 (4.68) | 109.7 (4.32) | 107.3 (4.22) | 37.0 (1.46) | 18.8 (0.74) | 12.5 (0.49) | 21.6 (0.85) | 42.2 (1.66) | 102.3 (4.03) | 109.3 (4.30) | 148.6 (5.85) | 942.6 (37.11) |
| Average precipitation days (≥ 0.1 mm) | 7.3 | 7.4 | 7.0 | 7.8 | 4.6 | 3.8 | 3.0 | 3.2 | 4.7 | 8.0 | 8.4 | 8.8 | 74.0 |
| Average snowy days | 0.0 | 0.0 | 0.0 | 0.0 | 0.0 | 0.0 | 0.1 | 0.0 | 0.0 | 0.0 | 0.0 | 0.0 | 0.1 |
| Average relative humidity (%) | 75.4 | 79.3 | 78.1 | 78.2 | 80.5 | 80.3 | 76.8 | 71.4 | 68.9 | 69.9 | 66.8 | 69.6 | 74.6 |
| Mean monthly sunshine hours | 288.3 | 237.3 | 226.3 | 180.0 | 164.3 | 144.0 | 167.4 | 198.4 | 204.0 | 226.3 | 261.0 | 279.0 | 2,576.3 |
| Mean daily sunshine hours | 9.3 | 8.4 | 7.3 | 6.0 | 5.3 | 4.8 | 5.4 | 6.4 | 6.8 | 7.3 | 8.7 | 9.0 | 7.1 |
| Percentage possible sunshine | 60 | 63 | 56 | 57 | 49 | 45 | 47 | 55 | 54 | 54 | 60 | 55 | 55 |
Source 1: Servicio Meteorológico Nacional
Source 2: NOAA (percent sun 1961–1990)

== Notable people ==
- Guillermo Pfening, actor and film director.
