= Vitor (footballer, born 1997) =

Brazilian footballer

Personal information
- Full name: Romildo Vitor Gomes Ferreira Neto
- Date of birth: 12 December 1997 (age 28)
- Place of birth: Recife, Brazil
- Height: 1.75 m (5 ft 9 in)
- Position: Attacking midfielder

Team information
- Current team: Treze

Youth career
- 2011–2013: Mogi Mirim

Senior career*
| Years | Team | Apps | (Gls) |
| 2014–2016 | Mogi Mirim | 9 | (0) |
| 2016 | Flamengo | 0 | (0) |
| 2017 | Figueirense | 0 | (0) |
| 2018 | Mogi Mirim | 0 | (0) |
| 2019 | Sampaio Corrêa | 1 | (0) |
| 2019–2020 | Chabab Mohammédia | | |
| 2021– | Treze | 1 (Note: Appearances in 2021 Campeonato Paraibano:) | (0) |
- * Club domestic league appearances and goals as of 10:37, 14 May 2021 (UTC)

Romildo Vitor Gomes Ferreira Neto, commonly known as Vitor and previously Romildinho is a Brazilian footballer who plays as an attacking midfielder for Treze. He played at the Brazilian national league level for Mogi Mirim in 2014 and 2015.

He is related to both Rivaldo and Rivaldinho.

== Career history ==
Vitor came through the youth ranks of Mogi Mirim, where he played in the Under 15 team as a 13 year old. He made his professional debut for the team as a 16 year-old, on 17 August 2014 in a 2014 Campeonato Brasileiro Série C game against Duque de Caxias. Under contract with Mogi Mirim until 2017, his uncle negotiated a move to Flamengo in June 2016, where he would be part of the U20 set-up, initially.

Vitor moved to be part of the U19 set-up at Figueirense in 2017, and spent time with Sampaio Corrêa in 2019 before moving to Morocco with SCC Mohammédia. He signed for Treze Futebol Clube in April 2021.

== Personal life ==
Vitor is the nephew of Rivaldo, and therefore cousin of Rivaldinho. The stadium of Mogi Mirim, Estádio Vail Chaves, where he made his professional debut, was at the time called Estádio Romildo Vitor Gomes Ferreira, after his grandfather.
