= 2020 Campeonato Paraibano =

Campeonato Paraibano de Futebol
- Season: 2020
- Champions: Treze
- Relegated: CSP; Sport-PB
- 2021 Copa do Brasil: Campinense; Treze
- 2021 Série D: Sousa; Campinense
- 2021 Copa do Nordeste: Campinense; Treze
- Matches: 56
- Goals: 128 (2.29 per match)
- Top goalscorer: 9 goals Rafael Ibiapino, Campinense
- Biggest home win: CSP 7–0 Sport-PB; Round 9, 22 July 2020
- Biggest away win: Sport-PB 0–6 Campinense; Round 6, 1 March 2020
- Highest scoring: Sport-PB 0–6 Campinense; Round 6, 1 March 2020
- Longest winning run: 3 (Botafogo-PB)
- Longest unbeaten run: 11 (Botafogo-PB)
- Longest winless run: 6 (Sport-PB)
- Longest losing run: 6 (Sport-PB)
- All statistics correct as of 21:56, 15 August 2020 (UTC).

The 2020 Campeonato Paraibano de Futebol was the 110th edition of Paraíba's top professional football league. The competition began on 21 January and ended on 15 August.

Botafogo-PB were defending champions, after winning the 2019 final against Campinense.

The season was suspended indefinitely on 18 March 2020 due to the COVID-19 pandemic. On 18 June 2020, the Federação Paraibana announced that the competition would restart on 18 July.

Treze were crowned champions after beating Campinense 2–1 in the two-legged final.

== Format ==
The competition was divided into a number of stages.

In the first (group) stage, the ten teams were divided into two groups of five. Each team played the five teams in the other group, home and away, for a total of ten games. The teams that finished first and second in each group qualified directly for the second (semi-final) stage. The teams that finished last in each group were relegated to the second division.

In the second (semi-final) stage, the winner of each group played the runner up of their group over two games, home and away. The group winner had home advantage in the second leg.

In the third (final) stage, the two winning teams from the second (semi-final) stage played over two legs, with the team with the best record in the competition so far playing the second leg at home.

=== Qualification ===
The two finalists, Treze and Campinense qualified to participate in the 2021 Copa do Brasil and 2021 Copa do Nordeste. The two best placed teams (other than those already participating in a national league), Campinense and Sousa qualified to participate in the 2021 Campeonato Brasileiro Série D.

== Participating teams ==
Club	Home city	2019 result
Atlético Cajazeirense	Cajazeiras	3rd
Botafogo-PB	João Pessoa	1st
Campinense	Campina Grande	2nd
CSP	João Pessoa	8th
Nacional de Patos	Patos	4th
Perilima	Campina Grande	6th
São Paulo Crystal	Cruz do Espírito Santo	2nd (Second Division)
Sousa	Sousa	5th
Sport-PB	Campina Grande	1st (Second Division)
Treze	Campina Grande	7th

== First stage ==
=== Group A ===
Pos	Team	Pld	W	D	L	GF	GA	GD	Pts	Qualification
1	Treze (Q)	10	6	2	2	11	6	+5	20	Advance to Semi-final stage
2	Botafogo-PB (Q)	10	5	5	0	15	7	+8	20	Advance to Semi-final stage
3	Atlético Cajazeirense	10	5	4	1	14	5	+9	19	
4	Perilima	10	3	1	6	10	16	−6	10	
5	Sport-PB (R)	10	1	0	9	4	29	−25	3	Relegated to Division 2

Rules for classification: 1) points; 2) wins; 3) goal difference; 4) number of goals scored; 5) least red cards; 6) least yellow cards.
(Q) Qualified for the phase indicated; (R) Relegated

=== Group B ===
Pos	Team	Pld	W	D	L	GF	GA	GD	Pts	Qualification
1	Campinense (Q)	10	5	2	3	16	7	+9	17	Advance to Semi-final stage
2	Sousa (Q)	10	4	3	3	12	12	0	15	Advance to Semi-final stage
3	São Paulo Crystal	10	3	3	4	11	8	+3	12	
4	Nacional de Patos	10	3	3	4	10	14	−4	12	
5	CSP (R)	10	3	1	6	14	13	+1	10	Relegated to Division 2

Rules for classification: 1) points; 2) wins; 3) goal difference; 4) number of goals scored; 5) least red cards; 6) least yellow cards.
(Q) Qualified for the phase indicated; (R) Relegated

== Semi-finals ==
In the semi-final stage, the winner of each group will play the runner up of their group over two games, home and away. The group winner has home advantage in the second leg.

Semi-finals were originally scheduled to be played between 5 April and 12 April 2020. They will now be played on 31 July and 4 August 2020.

Team 1	Agg.	Team 2	1st leg	2nd leg
Botafogo-PB	2–2 (4–5 p)	Treze	2–0	0–2
Sousa	2–2 (4–5 p)	Campinense	2–2	0–0

== Final ==
The final will take place over two games, home and away, and the team with the best record in the competition has home advantage in the second leg.

The final was originally scheduled to take place on 19 and 26 April 2020. They will now be played on 12 and 15 August 2020.

Team 1	Agg.	Team 2	1st leg	2nd leg
Treze	2–1	Campinense	2–0	0–1
