= Dionísio (footballer, born 1994) =

Brazilian footballer

Personal information
- Full name: Dionísio Pereira de Souza Neto
- Date of birth: 17 April 1994 (age 32)
- Place of birth: Itapetinga, Brazil
- Height: 1.72 m (5 ft 8 in)
- Position: Midfielder

Team information
- Current team: Ypiranga
- Number: 27

Youth career
- Vitória da Conquista

Senior career*
Years	Team	Apps	(Gls)
2013–2018	Vitória da Conquista	30	(2)
2016	→ Atlântico-BA (loan)		
2018	Pituaçu		
2019–2020	Bahia de Feira	7	(1)
2020	Jacobina	7	(2)
2020–2022	Atlético de Alagoinhas	46	(9)
2021	→ Jacuipense (loan)	9	(0)
2022–2025	Vitória	28	(1)
2024	→ Brusque (loan)	34	(0)
2025	→ Confiança (loan)	18	(1)
2026–	Ypiranga	25	(0)
- * Club domestic league appearances and goals as of 10 November 2026

Dionísio Pereira de Souza Neto (born 17 April 1994), simply known as Dionísio, is a Brazilian professional footballer who plays as a midfielder for Brazilian club Ypiranga.

== Career ==
Born in Itapetinga, Bahia, Dionísio played most of his career for teams in the state, especially for Vitória da Conquista where he was from 2013 to 2018. In 2021 and 2022 he was part of the state champion squads with Atlético de Alagoinhas, being considered the great highlight of that team. He was hired by Vitória where he won the 2023 Campeonato Brasileiro Série B, but due to a knee injury, he lost space in the team. In 2024, Dionísio was loaned to Brusque. For the 2025 season, he returned to Vitória to compete in the Campeonato Baiano. In April, Dionísio was loaned to AD Confiança to compete in the Série C.

== Honours ==
Vitória da Conquista

- Copa Governador do Estado da Bahia: 2014, 2016

Atlântico

- Campeonato Baiano Second Division: 2016

Atlético de Alagoinhas

- Campeonato Baiano: 2021, 2022

Vitória

- Campeonato Brasileiro Série B: 2023
