= Arias, Argentina =

Arias
- City
- Location of Arias in Argentina
- Coordinates: 33°38′S 62°25′W
- Country: Argentina
- Province: Córdoba
- Department: Marcos Juárez

Government
  - Intendant: Javier Defagot

Population (2010 census)
  - Total: 7 075
- Time zone: UTC-3 (ART)
- CPA base: X2624
- Dialing code: +54 3468

Arias is a city in the province of Córdoba, Argentina. It had 7,075 inhabitants at the 2010 census [INDEC].
