= 2021 Campeonato Cearense =

Campeonato Cearense
- Season: 2021
- Dates: 10 February – 23 May
- Champions: Fortaleza (44th title)
- Relegated: Barbalha; Guarany de Sobral
- Copa do Brasil: Ceará; Ferroviário; Fortaleza (via 2021 Série A)
- Série D: Crato; Icasa; Pacajus
- Copa do Nordeste: Fortaleza; Ceará (via RNC)
- Copa do Nordeste qualification: Ferroviário; Atlético Cearense; Floresta (via RNC)
- Matches played: 59
- Goals scored: 181 (3.07 per match)
- Top goalscorer: Olávio (14 goals)

The 2021 Campeonato Cearense (officially the Cearense Ypióca 2021 for sponsorship reasons) was the 107th edition of Ceará's top professional football league organized by FCF. The competition began on 10 February 2021.

Due to the worsening of the COVID-19 pandemic in Brazil, the Government of Ceará suspended the Campeonato Cearense on 11 March 2021. The tournament resumed on 1 May 2021, and ended on 23 May 2021.

In the final, the defending champions Fortaleza and Ceará tied 0–0. Fortaleza were declared champions, winning their 44th title, due to their best performance in the tournament.

== Format ==
In the first stage the teams (except the teams that participated in the 2021 Copa do Nordeste, Ceará and Fortaleza) played the other teams in a single round-robin tournament. Top six teams advanced to the second stage, while the bottom two teams were relegated to 2022 Campeonato Cearense Série B. First stage winners qualified for the 2022 Copa do Brasil.

In the second stage the first stage teams and Ceará and Fortaleza played in a single round-robin tournament. Top four teams advanced to the semi-finals.

Semi-finals and final were played on a single-leg basis, with the higher-seeded team hosting the leg. If tied, the higher-seeded team would be the winners. Champions qualified for the 2022 Copa do Brasil.

== Teams ==
Club	Home city
Atlético Cearense	Fortaleza
Barbalha	Barbalha
Caucaia	Caucaia
Ceará	Fortaleza
Crato	Crato
Ferroviário	Fortaleza
Fortaleza	Fortaleza
Guarany de Sobral	Sobral
Icasa	Juazeiro do Norte
Pacajus	Pacajus

== First stage ==
Pos	Team	Pld	W	D	L	GF	GA	GD	Pts	Qualification or relegation
1	Ferroviário	7	5	1	1	12	5	+7	16	Advance to the second stage and qualify for the 2022 Copa do Brasil
2	Pacajus	7	3	4	0	9	3	+6	13	Advance to the second stage
3	Atlético Cearense	7	3	3	1	12	8	+4	12	Advance to the second stage
4	Caucaia	7	3	1	3	14	6	+8	10	Advance to the second stage
5	Icasa	7	2	4	1	9	7	+2	10	Advance to the second stage
6	Crato	7	1	2	4	6	9	−3	5	Advance to the second stage
7	Guarany de Sobral (R)	7	1	2	4	4	10	−6	5	Relegation to the 2022 Campeonato Cearense Série B
8	Barbalha (R)	7	1	1	5	5	23	−18	4	Relegation to the 2022 Campeonato Cearense Série B

Source: FCF
Rules for classification: 1) Points; 2) Wins; 3) Goal difference; 4) Goals scored; 5) Head-to-head result (only between two teams); 6) Draw.
(R) Relegated

== Second stage ==
On 10 March (1st round), Caucaia fielded, against Pacajus, the ineligible player Hugo Freitas. Due to this, Caucaia were deducted six points and sanctioned with a fine of R$5,000 after they were punished, on 23 March, by Tribunal de Justiça Desportiva do Futebol do Ceará (TJDF).

Pos	Team	Pld	W	D	L	GF	GA	GD	Pts	Qualification
1	Fortaleza	7	5	2	0	20	2	+18	17	Advance to the semi-finals
2	Ferroviário	7	5	2	0	14	4	+10	17	Advance to the semi-finals
3	Ceará	7	4	1	2	15	8	+7	13	Advance to the semi-finals
4	Atlético Cearense	7	3	2	2	21	11	+10	11	Advance to the semi-finals
5	Pacajus	7	2	3	2	10	9	+1	9	
6	Crato	7	1	1	5	7	23	−16	4	
7	Icasa	7	1	0	6	3	19	−16	3	
8	Caucaia (Note: Caucaia were deducted six points.)	7	1	1	5	11	25	−14	−2	

Source: FCF
Rules for classification: 1) Points; 2) Wins; 3) Goal difference; 4) Goals scored; 5) Head-to-head result (only between two teams); 6) Draw.

== Final stages ==
=== Semi-finals ===
19 May 2021
21:30

Fortaleza	6–0	Atlético Cearense
Lucas Crispim 10', 74'; Yago Pikachu 61'; Luiz Henrique 84'; Romarinho 88'; Ronald 90'	Report

Castelão, Fortaleza
Attendance: 0
Referee: Antônio Magno Lima Cordeiro

19 May 2021
15:30

Ferroviário	0–3	Ceará
	Report	Klaus 74'; Saulo Mineiro 78', 87'

Castelão, Fortaleza
Attendance: 0
Referee: Luiz César de Oliveira Magalhães

=== Final ===
23 May 2021
17:00

Fortaleza	0–0	Ceará
	Report

Castelão, Fortaleza
Attendance: 0
Referee: Rafael Traci (Santa Catarina)

== Overall table ==
Pos	Team	Pld	W	D	L	GF	GA	GD	Pts	Qualification or relegation
1	Fortaleza	9	6	3	0	26	2	+24	21	Champions and 2022 Copa do Brasil (Note: Fortaleza qualified for the 2022 Copa do Brasil via 2021 Campeonato Brasileiro Série A.)
2	Ceará	9	5	2	2	18	8	+10	17	Runners-up and 2022 Copa do Brasil
3	Ferroviário	8	5	2	1	14	7	+7	17	2022 Copa do Brasil
4	Atlético Cearense	8	3	2	3	21	17	+4	11	
5	Pacajus	7	2	3	2	10	9	+1	9	2022 Série D
6	Crato	7	1	1	5	7	23	−16	4	2022 Série D
7	Icasa	7	1	0	6	3	19	−16	3	2022 Série D
8	Caucaia (Note: Caucaia were deducted six points.)	7	1	1	5	11	25	−14	−2	
9	Guarany de Sobral	7	1	2	4	4	10	−6	5	Relegation to the 2022 Campeonato Cearense Série B
10	Barbalha	7	1	1	5	5	23	−18	4	Relegation to the 2022 Campeonato Cearense Série B

Source: FCF

== Top goalscorers ==
No.	Player	Club	Goals
1	Olávio	Atlético Cearense	14
2	Ciel	Caucaia	8
3	Adilson Bahia	Ferroviário	7
3	Valdo Bacabal	Atlético Cearense	7
