= Monte Buey =

- Town
- Location of Monte Buey in Argentina
- Coordinates: 32°25′S 62°21′W
- Country: Argentina
- Province: Córdoba
- Department: Marcos Juárez

Government
  - Intendant: Mariano Calamante

Population
  - Total: 6,285
- Demonym: monteboyense
- Time zone: UTC−3 (ART)
- CPA base: X2589
- Dialing code: +54 03467

Monte Buey is a town located in the Marcos Juárez Department of Córdoba Province, Argentina.

== History ==
The settlement was established in 1909 when the General Bartolomé Mitre railway built a railway station named Monte de Buey. In 1910 it was recorded that the only building in the locality was the railway station.

The settlement has gradually expanded, having a population of 6,285 in 2010.
