= São Paulo Crystal Futebol Clube =

Brazilian association football club based in Cruz do Espírito Santo, Paraíba, Brazil

São Paulo Crystal
- Full name: São Paulo Crystal Futebol Clube
- Nickname: Carcará (Crested caracara)
- Founded: February 10, 2008 (18 years ago)
- Ground: Carneirão
- Capacity: 1,200
- President: Múcio Carlos
- Head coach: Wilton Bezerra
- League: Campeonato Paraibano Segunda Divisão
- 2025: Paraibano Segunda Divisão, 6th of 10
- Website: https://saopaulocrystalfc.com.br/
| Home colors | Away colors |

São Paulo Crystal Futebol Clube, formerly known as Lucena Sport Clube, is a Brazilian sports association in the state of Paraíba in the north-east of the country, primarily known for its professional football team. Founded in 2008 in the city of Lucena, it played in Campina Grande from 2014 to 2016, and moved to Cruz do Espírito Santo in June 2017 when it took its current name. Its home stadium is Carneirão in its home town, although it plays some games in stadia in João Pessoa for commercial reasons.

== History ==
Founded in 2008 as Lucena Sport Clube, the football team turned professional in 2014 and competed for the first time in second division of the Campeonato Paraibano. Although based at the Toscanão stadium in Lucena, this ground could not be approved, and the club played its games at Estádio da Graça in João Pessoa. Playing in the coastal group of the competition, the club won promotion as champions.

For their first season at the top level of football in Paraíba, the club requested to play most of their games at Amigão in Campina Grande, due to there being five other clubs in the division based in João Pessoa, and only two approved grounds. They finished the season in 9th and were relegated. Electing to remain based in Campina Grande, the club were placed in the Campina Grande group of the 2016 second division, where they finished bottom, without a win from their four games.

In June 2017, for sponsorship reasons, the club rebranded as São Paulo Crystal Futebol Clube, changed its crest and kits, and moved to Cruz do Espírito Santo. The name, which is similar to a product of the sponsoring company, was explained by the club as showing homage to São Paulo FC and Crystal Palace, with the crest similar to the English club and its first kit similar to the Brazilian club.

Playing most of its games at Carneirão in its home town, the club narrowly missed out on promotion from the second division in both 2017 and 2018. In 2019 it won promotion, finishing second in the division.

The club finished third in its group of the 2020 Campeonato Paraibano.

== Honours ==
- Campeonato Paraibano Second Division
  - Winners (1): 2014
