= Lucena, Paraíba =

Municipality in Paraíba, Brazil

Lucena
- Municipality
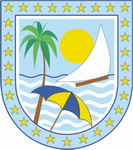
- Flag Coat of arms

- Location in Brazil
- Coordinates: 6°54′0″S 34°52′8″W
- Country: Brazil
- State: Paraíba
- Macroregion: Mata Paraibana
- Microregion: João Pessoa
- Founded: 1961

Government
  - Mayor: Antonio Mendonça Monteiro Júnior

Area
  - Total: 89.202 km^{2} (34.441 sq mi)
- Elevation: 3 m (9.8 ft)

Population (2020)
  - Total: 13,214
  - Density: 148.14/km^{2} (383.67/sq mi)
- Demonym: Lucenenses
- Time zone: UTC−3 (BRT)
- Website: www.lucena.pb.gov.br

Lucena is a municipality in the state of Paraíba in the Northeast Region of Brazil.

== See also ==
- List of municipalities in Paraíba
