= Cruz do Espírito Santo =

- Municipality
- Flag Coat of arms

- Location in Brazil
- Coordinates: 7°08′S 35°06′W
- Country: Brazil
- Region: Northeast
- State: Paraíba
- Mesoregion: Mata Paraibana

Population (2020)
  - Total: 17,461
- Time zone: UTC−3 (BRT)

Cruz do Espírito Santo is a municipality in the state of Paraíba in the Northeast Region of Brazil.

== See also ==
- List of municipalities in Paraíba
