= Flamingo (disambiguation) =

Flamingo is the common name for birds in the genus Phoenicopterus.

Flamingo, Flamingoes or Flamingos may also refer to:

== Places ==
=== Topology ===
- Flamingo, Costa Rica, a beach
- Flamingo/Lummus, Miami Beach, Florida, United States
- Flamingo, Monroe County, Florida, a ghost town
- Flamingo Bay (disambiguation)

=== Airports ===
- Flamingo International Airport, Kralendijk, Bonaire, Netherlands Antilles

=== Roads ===
- Flamingo Road (Las Vegas)
- Flamingo Road, part of Florida State Road 823

== People ==
- Raven (wrestler) and Scotty Flamingo, ring personae of American professional wrestler Scott Levy (born 1964)

== Arts, entertainment, and media ==
=== Fictional characters ===
- Flamingo (comics), a DC Comics villain

=== Music ===
==== Groups and labels ====
- Flamingo Recordings, a Dutch record label
- The Flamingos, an American doo-wop group

==== Albums ====
- Flamingo (Flamin' Groovies album) (1970)
- Flamingo (Brandon Flowers album) (2010)
- Flamingo (Herbie Mann album) (1955)
- Flamingo (Olympia album) (2019)
- Flamingos (album), a 2002 album by Enrique Bunbury

==== Songs ====
- "Flamingo" (song), a 1940 song written by Ted Grouya and Edmund Anderson
- "Flamingo", a 2018 song by Japanese musician Kenshi Yonezu, from Flamingo/Teenage Riot
- "Flamingo", a 2014 song by English group Kero Kero Bonito
- "Flamingo", a 2010 song by Venezuelan group La Vida Bohème
- "Flamingo", a 1973 song from the album A Wizard, a True Star by Todd Rundgren
- "Flamingo", a 2014 song by American singer-songwriter Rob Cantor

=== Other uses arts, entertainment, and media ===
- Flamingo (sculpture), a 1973 sculpture by Alexander Calder in Chicago, Illinois
- Flamingo Televisión, a Venezuelan regional television station from 1990 to 2000
- Captain Flamingo, Canadian animated TV series (2006–2010)
- Flamingo, a former book imprint of HarperCollins
- "Flamingos", a 2015 television episode of Ballers

== Brands and enterprises ==
- Flamingo Hotel, Miami Beach, Florida, a hotel from 1921 to the 1950s
- Flamingo Las Vegas, a casino resort and hotel in Las Vegas, Nevada, United States
- Flamingo Resort and Spa (Santa Rosa, California), a historic hotel in Santa Rosa, California, United States
- Flamingo, Vantaa, an entertainment center in Vantaa, Finland
- The Flamingo Club, a club in London, England which was a meeting place for international musicians from 1957 to 1962

== Military ==
- Flamingo, a popular name for the Panzer II Flamm tank
- HMS Flamingo, two ships
- USS Flamingo, three ships
- FP-5 "Flamingo", a Ukrainian ground-launched cruise missile

== Sports ==
- Flamingo Stakes, an American Thoroughbred horse race run annually from 1926 to 2001
- Flamingoes F.C., a disbanded nineteenth century English rugby union club
- Flamingos F.C., a Namibian football club since 1986
- Florida Flamingos, a charter franchise of World Team Tennis which played only in the 1974 season before folding
- Miami Beach Flamingos, a minor league baseball team from 1940 to 1954

== Transportation ==
=== Airlines ===
- Flamingo Air, two small seaplane airlines which operate between Florida and the Bahamas

=== Aircraft ===
- Aeros UL-2000 Flamingo, a Czech ultralight aircraft
- de Havilland Flamingo, a World War II era passenger airliner, also used by the Royal Air Force
- MBB 223 Flamingo, a West German 1960s light aircraft
- Metal Aircraft Flamingo, a monoplane unveiled in 1929
- Pegasus EDA 100 Flamingo, a Slovenian ultralight aircraft
- SGP M-222 Flamingo, an Austrian light aircraft first flown in 1959
- Udet U 12 Flamingo, an aerobatic sports plane and trainer aircraft developed in Germany in the mid-1920s

=== Automobiles ===
- GSM Flamingo, a South African sports car

=== Group transportation ===
- Flamingo (train), a named overnight train operated by the Louisville & Nashville between Cincinnati, Ohio and Jacksonville, Florida
- Flamingo coupé, a car manufactured by Glass Sport Motors

== Science ==
- Flamingo (protein), a protein involved in planar cell polarity and dendrite structure
- Flamingo flower, common name for flowers in the genus Anthurium

== Other uses ==
- Plastic flamingo, a plastic lawn ornament
- Flamingo (horse), British thoroughbred racehorse
- SS Flamingo (1909), a German cargo ship in service 1938-39, later serving as the Vorpostenboot V 109 Flamingo

== See also ==
- Flamengo (disambiguation)
- Flamenco (disambiguation)
- Flamingo Road (disambiguation)
