= Peter Fleming =

Peter Fleming may refer to:

- Peter Fleming (writer) (1907–1971), British writer, older brother of Ian Fleming
- Pete Fleming (1928–1956), martyred missionary
- Peter Fleming (tennis) (born 1955), American tennis player
- Peter E. Fleming Jr. (1929–2009), American criminal-defense lawyer
- Peter J. Fleming, British professor of engineering
- Peter Fleming (historian) (1958–2025), professor of medieval history

== See also ==
- Peter Flemming (born 1967), Canadian actor
- Peter Flemming (artist) (born 1973), Canadian installation artist
