= Alexander Fleming (disambiguation) =

Sir Alexander Fleming (1881–1955) was a Scottish physician and microbiologist.

Alexander Fleming may also refer to:

- Alexander Fleming (doctor) (1824–1875), Scottish doctor
- Al Fleming (basketball) (1954–2003), American basketball player
- Black Atlass (born Alex Fleming in 1994), Canadian singer-songwriter

== See also ==
- Fleming (disambiguation)
