= Flemings (disambiguation) =

Flemings may refer to:

- Flemish people, the majority population in Flanders
- Flemings (supermarkets), a chain of Australian supermarkets
- Robert Fleming & Co., a merchant bank founded in 1873 and sold to Chase Manhattan Bank
- Fleming's Prime Steakhouse & Wine Bar, a chain of US fine dining steakhouses
- Kingston Flemings (born 2007), American basketball player

== See also ==
- Fleming (disambiguation)
- Flemming
