= Flamengo (disambiguation) =

CR Flamengo is a Brazilian football club.

Flamengo may also refer to:

== Sports ==
=== Brazil ===
- Associação Atlética Flamengo, a Brazilian football club
- Clube de Regatas Flamengo (RO), a defunct Brazilian football club
- Clube de Regatas do Flamengo (Superleague Formula team), the Superleague formula division of CR Flamengo
- Clube de Regatas do Flamengo (women), the women's section of CR Flamengo
- Flamengo Basketball, the basketball division of CR Flamengo
- Esporte Clube Flamengo, a Brazilian football club
- Esporte Clube Flamengo Paraibano, a Brazilian football club
- Flamengo Esporte Clube, a defunct Brazilian football club
- Flamengo Esporte Clube de Arcoverde, a Brazilian football club
- Flamengo Esportivo Tiradentes de Brasília, a defunct Brazilian football club
- Sport Club Flamengo, a defunct Brazilian football club

=== Elsewhere (by country) ===
- Flamengo de Sucre, a Bolivian football club
- Uniao Flamengo Santos F.C., a Botswana football club
- Flamengo de Ngagara, a Burundian football club
- S.D. Flamengo, an Ecuadorian football club

== Other ==
- Flamengo (Czech band), a Czech progressive rock band active from 1966 to 1972
- Flamengo, Rio de Janeiro, a neighborhood located in Rio de Janeiro, Brazil
- Flamengo Park, a leisure area of Rio de Janeiro, Brazil

== See also ==
- Flamingo (disambiguation)
- Flamenco (disambiguation)
- Fleming (disambiguation)
- Flemish (disambiguation)
