= 2012 Campeonato Paraibano =

Campeonato Paraibano de Futebol
- Season: 2012
- Champions: Campinense (18th title)
- Relegated: Esporte; Flamengo Paraibano
- Matches: 98
- Goals: 309 (3.15 per match)
- Top goalscorer: Warley (Campinense) (22 goals)

The 2012 edition of Campeonato Paraibano's First Division was contested by 10 clubs and started on February 5, 2012. Treze were the defending champions, having won the tournament in 2011, but they were eliminated in the second stage by Sousa.

Campinense won their eighteenth league title, the first since 2008.

== Format ==
The format was the same used in 2011. The tournament is played in two stages: the first one is a standard round-robin format in which all teams play each other in home and away fixtures. Each win is awarded with 3 points, and each draw grants 1 point to both clubs involved in the match. The 2 worst-placed clubs of this stage will be relegated to 2013 Campeonato Paraibano Second Division. The second stage will be played in a two-legged knockout format, where the 4 best-placed teams from the first stage will compete.

If the champion from both stages ends up being the same team, it will be declared the 2012 Campeonato Paraibano champion. Otherwise, the winners from the two stages will play a new two-legged knockout to decide the champion. In any of the knockout stages, the clubs with the best records in the first stage are higher seeded, advancing in case of a draw.

== Team information ==
Team	City	Stadium	Capacity	2011 season
Auto Esporte	João Pessoa	Almeidão	40,000	Campeonato Paraibano 8th place
Botafogo	João Pessoa	Almeidão	40,000	Campeonato Paraibano 4th place
Campinense	Campina Grande	Amigão	35,000	Campeonato Paraibano runners-up
CSP	João Pessoa	Estádio da Graça	6,000	Campeonato Paraibano 3rd place
Esporte	Patos	José Cavalcanti	8,000	Campeonato Paraibano 6th place
Flamengo	João Pessoa	Estádio da Graça	6,000	Campeonato Paraibano Second Division runners-up (promoted)
Nacional	Patos	José Cavalcanti	8,000	Campeonato Paraibano 7th place
Paraíba	Cajazeiras	Perpetão	4,500	Campeonato Paraibano Second Division Champions (promoted)
Sousa	Sousa	Marizão	10,000	Campeonato Paraibano 4th place
Treze	Campina Grande	Amigão	35,000	Campeonato Paraibano Champions

== First stage ==
=== Standings ===
The 2012 Campeonato Paraibano first stage began on February 5 and ended on April 22.

Pos	Team	Pld	W	D	L	GF	GA	GD	Pts	Qualification or relegation
1	Campinense (C, A)	18	10	4	4	42	23	+19	34	Qualification for Second Stage
2	Treze (A)	18	10	3	5	29	19	+10	33	Qualification for Second Stage
3	Sousa (A)	18	8	8	2	32	21	+11	32	Qualification for Second Stage
4	Botafogo-PB (A)	18	9	4	5	38	24	+14	31	Qualification for Second Stage
5	Paraíba	18	9	4	5	26	17	+9	31	
6	Nacional de Patos	18	8	3	7	25	34	−9	27	
7	CSP	18	7	5	6	25	28	−3	26	
8	Auto Esporte	18	7	2	9	25	26	−1	23	
9	Esporte (R)	18	3	1	14	25	50	−25	10	Relegation to 2013 Campeonato Paraibano Second Division
10	Flamengo-PB (R)	18	1	2	15	15	40	−25	5	Relegation to 2013 Campeonato Paraibano Second Division

Updated to match(es) played on 13 May 2012. Source: Federação Paraibana de Futebol
Rules for classification: 1st points; 2nd wins; 3rd goals scored; 4th goals scored in away head-to-head matches; 5th head-to-head results; 6th least red cards received; 7th least yellow cards received; 8th extra match
(A) Advance to a further round; (C) Champions; (R) Relegated

=== Results ===
Home \ Away	AUT	BPB	CPN	CSP	ESP	FPB	NAC	PB	SOU	TRZ
Auto Esporte		2–1	1–1	0–3	1–0	2–1	2–0	3–1	1–1	0–2
Botafogo-PB	2–1		4–3	4–1	6–1	0–1	1–2	3–2	1–1	2–1
Campinense	2–1	3–3		3–0	6–3	2–0	2–1	3–1	2–3	2–1
CSP	1–0	0–3	1–1		2–1	2–1	2–2	1–0	3–2	0–1
Esporte	2–6	1–2	0–5	1–4		4–1	2–3	1–3	2–2	2–1
Flamengo-PB	0–2	0–3	0–4	1–1	1–2		2–3	2–2	1–2	1–3
Nacional de Patos	3–2	2–1	2–1	1–1	2–1	2–1		1–3	0–4	1–1
Paraíba	3–0	1–1	1–0	1–0	1–0	1–0	4–0		0–0	2–1
Sousa	2–1	1–1	0–1	2–2	2–1	2–1	3–0	0–0		3–2
Treze	1–0	1–0	1–1	4–1	2–1	3–1	1–0	1–0	2–2	

Updated to match(es) played on May 13, 2012. Source: Federação Paraibana de Futebol
Legend: Blue = home team win; Yellow = draw; Red = away team win.

== Second stage ==
The second stage started on April 25 and ended on May 6.

=== Semifinals ===
First legs were played on 25 April 2012. Return legs were played on 28 and 29 April 2012.

Team 1	Agg.	Team 2	1st leg	2nd leg
Treze (2)	1-5	(3) Sousa	0 – 2	1 – 3
Campinense (1)	3-3	(4) Botafogo-PB	3 – 2	0 – 1

=== Finals ===
Matches were played on 2 and 6 May 2012.

Team 1	Agg.	Team 2	1st leg	2nd leg
Campinense (1)	4-5	Sousa (3)	4 – 3	0 – 2

== Grand Finals ==
As the two stages didn't have the same winner, Campinense (first stage champion) and Sousa (second stage champion) played another two-legged play-off to decide the Campeonato Paraibano.

The matches were played on 9 and 13 May 2012. The aggregate 5–1 result gave Campinense their 18th title.

Team 1	Agg.	Team 2	1st leg	2nd leg
Campinense	5-1	Sousa	1 – 1	4 – 0
