= 2013 Campeonato Paraibano =

Campeonato Paraibano de Futebol
- Season: 2013
- Champions: Botafogo-PB
- Relegated: Paraíba; Cruzeiro
- Copa do Brasil: Botafogo
- Série D: Botafogo
- Copa do Nordeste: Botafogo; Treze
- Matches played: 119
- Goals scored: 329 (2.76 per match)
- Top goalscorer: Warley (Botafogo) - 14 goals

The 2013 Campeonato Paraibano de Futebol was the 103rd edition of the Paraíba's top professional football league. The competition began on January 6, and ended on May 30. Botafogo won the championship by the 26th time. while Paraíba and Cruzeiro were relegated.

== Format ==
In the first stage all teams except Campinense and Sousa played against each other twice. The six best teams advanced to the second stage, and the two worst teams were relegated. Also, the two best teams qualified for the final stage, but they still had to play the second stage.

In the second stage, the six teams were joined by Campinense and Sousa. All teams played against each other twice. The two best teams advanced to the final stage.

The four teams in the final stage played the semifinals, with the winners of each match contesting the final.

=== Qualifications ===
The champion qualified for the 2014 Copa do Brasil. The best team who isn't on Campeonato Brasileiro Série A, Série B and Série C qualified for the 2013 Campeonato Brasileiro Série D. The two best teams qualified for the 2014 Copa do Nordeste.

== Participating teams ==
| Club | Home city | 2012 result |
|---|---|---|
| Atlético Cajazeirense | Cajazeiras | 1st (2nd division) |
| Auto Esporte | João Pessoa | 8th |
| Botafogo-PB | João Pessoa | 4th |
| Campinense | Campina Grande | 1st |
| CSP | João Pessoa | 7th |
| Cruzeiro | Itaporanga | 2nd (2nd division) |
| Nacional | Patos | 6th |
| Paraíba | Cajazeiras | 5th |
| Sousa | Sousa | 2nd |
| Treze | Campina Grande | 3rd |

== First stage ==
=== Standings ===
| Pos | Team | Pld | W | D | L | GF | GA | GD | Pts | Qualification or relegation |
|---|---|---|---|---|---|---|---|---|---|---|
| 1 | Botafogo-PB | 14 | 10 | 4 | 0 | 36 | 11 | +25 | 34 | Advanced to the Second stage and to Final stage |
| 2 | Treze | 14 | 10 | 2 | 2 | 30 | 10 | +20 | 32 | Advanced to the Second stage and to Final stage |
| 3 | CSP | 14 | 6 | 3 | 5 | 28 | 19 | +9 | 21 | Advanced to the Second stage |
| 4 | Atlético Cajazeirense | 14 | 6 | 2 | 6 | 17 | 18 | −1 | 20 | Advanced to the Second stage |
| 5 | Auto Esporte | 14 | 4 | 4 | 6 | 13 | 27 | −14 | 16 | Advanced to the Second stage |
| 6 | Nacional de Patos | 14 | 4 | 2 | 8 | 20 | 26 | −6 | 14 | Advanced to the Second stage |
| 7 | Paraíba (R) | 14 | 2 | 5 | 7 | 11 | 23 | −12 | 11 | Relegated |
| 8 | Cruzeiro-PB (R) | 14 | 1 | 4 | 9 | 19 | 40 | −21 | 7 | Relegated |

Rules for classification: 1) points; 2) goal difference; 3) number of goals scored.
(R) Relegated

=== Results ===
| Home \ Away | ACJ | AUT | BPB | CSP | CRU | NAC | PB | TRZ |
|---|---|---|---|---|---|---|---|---|
| Atlético Cajazeirense | | 2–0 | 1–1 | 3–0 | 3–2 | 2–1 | 1–0 | 1–2 |
| Auto Esporte | 1–1 | | 0–3 | 2–1 | 1–0 | 3–1 | 1–0 | 0–4 |
| Botafogo-PB | 2–1 | 1–1 | | 1–0 | 9–2 | 3–1 | 5–0 | 1–1 |
| CSP | 1–0 | 7–1 | 0–0 | | 8–2 | 1–0 | 0–0 | 2–4 |
| Cruzeiro-PB | 1–0 | 1–1 | 0–1 | 2–4 | | 1–3 | 3–4 | 0–1 |
| Nacional de Patos | 3–1 | 3–1 | 1–2 | 1–2 | 3–3 | | 1–1 | 0–1 |
| Paraíba | 0–1 | 1–1 | 0–3 | 2–2 | 1–1 | 1–2 | | 1–0 |
| Treze | 4–0 | 2–0 | 3–4 | 1–0 | 1–1 | 4–0 | 2–0 | |

Legend: Blue = home team win; Yellow = draw; Red = away team win.

== Second stage ==
The six teams from first stage are joined by Campinense and Sousa.

=== Standings ===
| Pos | Team | Pld | W | D | L | GF | GA | GD | Pts | Qualification |
|---|---|---|---|---|---|---|---|---|---|---|
| 1 | Campinense | 14 | 8 | 3 | 3 | 23 | 13 | +10 | 27 | Advanced to the Second stage |
| 2 | CSP | 14 | 7 | 3 | 4 | 24 | 16 | +8 | 24 | Advanced to the Second stage |
| 3 | Atlético Cajazeirense | 14 | 7 | 1 | 6 | 20 | 17 | +3 | 22 | |
| 4 | Treze | 14 | 6 | 3 | 5 | 15 | 9 | +6 | 21 | |
| 5 | Auto Esporte | 14 | 6 | 2 | 6 | 14 | 19 | −5 | 20 | |
| 6 | Botafogo-PB | 14 | 5 | 3 | 6 | 17 | 16 | +1 | 18 | |
| 7 | Sousa | 14 | 4 | 6 | 4 | 19 | 22 | −3 | 18 | |
| 8 | Nacional de Patos | 14 | 2 | 1 | 11 | 11 | 31 | −20 | 7 | |

Rules for classification: 1) points; 2) goal difference; 3) number of goals scored.

=== Results ===
| Home \ Away | ACJ | AUT | BPB | CPN | CSP | NAC | SOU | TRZ |
|---|---|---|---|---|---|---|---|---|
| Atlético Cajazeirense | | 1–0 | 2–1 | 2–3 | 2–1 | 2–0 | 1–0 | 1–0 |
| Auto Esporte | 2–1 | | 0–2 | 1–0 | 0–2 | 3–1 | 1–1 | 0–3 |
| Botafogo-PB | 2–1 | 2–0 | | 1–4 | 3–0 | 2–2 | 1–1 | 1–0 |
| Campinense | 1–0 | 4–0 | 1–0 | | 1–1 | 3–0 | 2–2 | 0–4 |
| CSP | 1–1 | 0–3 | 2–1 | 2–0 | | 2–1 | 5–0 | 1–1 |
| Nacional de Patos | 1–3 | 1–2 | 1–0 | 0–2 | 0–3 | | 2–5 | 2–1 |
| Sousa | 3–2 | 1–1 | 1–1 | 0–2 | 3–2 | 2–0 | | 0–0 |
| Treze | 2–1 | 0–1 | 1–0 | 0–0 | 0–2 | 1–0 | 2–0 | |

Legend: Blue = home team win; Yellow = draw; Red = away team win.

== Final stage ==
Semifinals
Treze | 1 | 0 | 1
Campinense | 0 | 1 | 1
Botafogo | 1 | 4 | 5
CSP | 0 | 0 | 0

Finals
Treze | 1 | 0 | 1
Botafogo | 0 | 3 | 3

=== Semifinals ===
==== First leg ====
May 21, 2013
20:30 UTC−03:00

| Campinense | 0–1 | Treze |
|---|---|---|
| | | Sapé 44' |

Amigão, Campina Grande

May 21, 2013
20:30 UTC−03:00

| CSP | 0–1 | Botafogo |
|---|---|---|
| | | Ferreira 64' |

Almeidão, João Pessoa

==== Second leg ====
May 24, 2013
20:30 UTC−03:00

| Treze | 0–1 | Campinense |
|---|---|---|
| | | Selmir 90+1' |

Amigão, Campina Grande

May 24, 2013
20:30 UTC−03:00

| Botafogo | 4–0 | CSP |
|---|---|---|
| Fábio Neves 6'; Warley 35'; Thurran 45+2'; Wanderley 83' |

Almeidão, João Pessoa

=== Finals ===
May 27, 2013
20:30 UTC−03:00

| Botafogo | 0–1 | Treze |
|---|---|---|
| | | Birungueta 70' |

Almeidão, João Pessoa

May 30, 2013
20:30 UTC−03:00

| Treze | 0–3 | Botafogo |
|---|---|---|
| | | Wanderley 67'; Hércules 71'; Ferreira 90+2' (pen.) |

Amigão, Campina Grande
Referee: Wilton Sampaio

Botafogo is the champion of the 2013 Campeonato Paraibano.
