= Flemyng =

Flemyng is a surname. Notable persons with that name include:

- Gordon Flemyng (1934–1995), Scottish film and television director
- Jason Flemyng (born 1966), English actor
- Malcolm Flemyng (died 1764), Scottish physiologist
- Robert Flemyng (1912–1995), British actor

== See also ==
- Fleming (disambiguation)
- Flemming (disambiguation)
