= Flander (surname) =

Flander is a surname. Notable people with the surname include:

- Erika Flander (born 1965), Hungarian gymnast
- Rok Flander (born 1979), Slovenian snowboarder

== See also ==
- Flanders (surname)
