= Flemish architecture =

Flemish architecture may refer to:

- Architecture of Belgium
- Architecture of the Netherlands

== See also ==
- Flemish (disambiguation)
- Flemish painting
