= A. J. Pollard =

English medieval historian (born 1941)

A. J. Pollard FRHistS
- Born: Anthony James Pollard; 1941 (age 84–85); Taunton, Somerset, England
- Occupations: Historian and academic
- Children: 2

Academic background
- Education: University of Bristol
- Thesis: The Family of Talbot, Lords Talbot and Earls of Shrewsbury, 1387-1453 (1968)
- Doctoral advisor: Charles Ross

Academic work
- Discipline: History
- Sub-discipline: England in the Late Middle Ages; Wars of the Roses; North East England; Political history; Social history
- Institutions: Teesside University
- Doctoral students: Anne Curry

Anthony James Pollard FRHistS (born 1941) is a British medieval historian, specialising in north-eastern England during the Wars of the Roses. He is considered a leading authority on the field. He is emeritus professor of Teesside University, having joined Teesside Polytechnic as a lecturer in 1969 and retiring in 2008. He became a professor in 1992, the same year the polytechnic acquired university status.

In addition to works on the Wars of the Roses, he has also written a general history of fifteenth-century England (2000) and books on Robin Hood (2004) and Warwick the Kingmaker (2007), Henry V (2014) and Edward IV (2016). He has in addition edited collections of essays on fifteenth-century history and the history of the north-east of England as a region.

Pollard is a fellow of the Royal Historical Society and was the recipient of a festschrift in 2020, a special edition of the journal The Fifteenth Century edited by Linda Clark and Peter Fleming and titled Rulers, Regions and Affinities.

Pollard chaired the North-East England History Institute between 1998 and 2000. He chaired the advisory committee of the Victoria County History for Durham and served on the series' national committee. He was also vice-president of the Surtees Society, the record society for northern England, and served on the Research Assessment Exercise panel in 1996 and 2001. He sat on the advisory board of the journal The Fifteenth Century and on the publications committee of the Richard III Society.

== Personal life ==
Pollard is married to Sandra and they have two sons together.

== Selected works ==
- Pollard, A. J. (1983), John Talbot and the War in France, 1427–1453, London: Royal Historical Society, ISBN 0-901050-88-1.
- Pollard, A. J. (1988), The Wars of the Roses, Basingstoke: Macmillan Education, ISBN 0-333-40603-6.
- Pollard, A. J. (1990), North-Eastern England during the Wars of the Roses: Lay Society, War, and Politics 1450–1500, Oxford: Clarendon Press, ISBN 978-0198200871.
- Pollard, A. J. (1991), Richard III and the Princes in the Tower, Stroud: Sutton, ISBN 0862996600.
- Britnell, R. H.; Pollard, A. J., eds. (1995), The McFarlane Legacy: Studies in Late-Medieval Politics and Society, Stroud: Sutton, ISBN 978-0312125905.
- Pollard, A.J., ed. (1995), The Wars of the Roses, London: Palgrave Macmillan, ISBN 978-0333601655.
- Pollard, A. J. (2000), Late Medieval England 1399–1509, Harlow: Longman, ISBN 0-582-03134-6.
- Pollard, A. J. (2004), Imagining Robin Hood: The Late-Medieval Stories in Historical Context, London: Routledge, ISBN 0-415-22308-3.
- Pollard, A. J. (2007), Warwick the Kingmaker: Politics, Power and Fame, London: Hambledon, ISBN 978-1-84725-182-4.
- Pollard, A. J. (2014), Henry V, Stroud: History Press, ISBN 9780752497631.
- Pollard, A. J. (2016), Edward IV: The Summer King, London: Penguin, ISBN 978-0141978697.
