= Campeonato Paraibano Third Division =

Football league in Brazil

- Organising body: FPF
- Founded: 2021; 5 years ago
- Country: Brazil
- State: Paraíba
- Level on pyramid: 3
- Promotion to: 2nd Division
- Current champions: Miramar (1st title) (2024)
- Most championships: Various teams 1 title each
- Website: FPF Official website

The Campeonato Paraibano Third Division is the third tier of the professional state football league in the Brazilian state of Paraíba. It is run by the Paraíba Football Federation (FPF).

== List of champions ==
Season	Champions	Runners-up
2021	Spartax (1)	Paraíba
2022	Pombal (1)	Esporte
2023	Cruzeiro (1)	Santa Rita
2024	Miramar (1)	Serrano
2025	Cancelled	

=== Notes ===
1. Internacional lost the 2022 edition title in the sports court.

== Titles by team ==
Teams in bold stills active.

Rank	Club	Winners	Winning years
1	**Cruzeiro**	1	2023
1	**Pombal**	1	2022
1	**Miramar**	1	2024
1	**Spartax**	1	2021

=== By city ===
City	Championships	Clubs
João Pessoa	1	Spartax (1)
Pombal	1	Pombal (1)
Cabedelo	1	Miramar (1)
Itaporanga	1	Cruzeiro (1)
