= Warley (footballer, born 1978) =

Brazilian footballer

Personal information
- Full name: Warley Silva dos Santos
- Date of birth: 13 February 1978 (age 48)
- Place of birth: Planaltina, Federal District, Brazil
- Height: 1.78 m (5 ft 10 in)
- Position: Forward

Senior career*
Years	Team	Apps	(Gls)
1997	Coritiba	0	(0)
1997–1998	Atlético Paranaense	18	(7)
1999–2003	Udinese	37	(3)
1999	→ São Paulo (loan)	26	(6)
2000–2001	→ Grêmio (loan)	19	(7)
2003–2004	São Caetano	42	(8)
2005	Palmeiras	22	(4)
2006–2007	Brasiliense	47	(16)
2008	Náutico	0	(0)
2008	ABC	14	(3)
2009	Madureira		
2010	Villa Nova		
2011	Treze	11	(7)
2012	Campinense		
2013	Botafogo (PB)		
2014–2016	Ríver	7	(4)
2016–	Botafogo-PB	25	(3)

International career
1999–2000	Brazil U-23	12	(2)
1999	Brazil	4	(0)
- * Club domestic league appearances and goals as of 8 February 2016

Warley Silva dos Santos (born 13 February 1978) is a Brazilian former footballer who last played as a forward for Botafogo-PB. Warley spent most of his career at Campeonato Brasileiro Série A and had an unsuccessful career with Italian club Udinese.

== Club career ==
=== Beginnings in Brazil ===
Warley started his career at Brazil, and played for Coritiba, Atlético Paranaense before signed by Italian Serie A side Udinese in January 1999. He was loaned to São Paulo until June 1999.

Udinese acquired half of his registration rights from a Uruguayan club Rentistas for US$9M, which in fact was received by his player agent. He signed a contract until 30 June 2003.

=== Udinese & passport controversy ===
He played his first Serie A match on 19 September 1999 as starter, but Udinese lost the match to Juventus 1–4 while Warley went without a goal. He played 15 league matches that season. In September 2000, he followed Udinese traveled to Poland for the UEFA Cup match against Polonia Warsaw. But Polish officials discovered that his Portuguese passport was fake along with team-mate Alberto. Warley was immediately loaned to Grêmio for a year in order to fulfill the non-EU quota. The quota system was abolished in mid of 2000–01 season, but in June 2001, Warley along with 9 others including 3 of his team-mate (Alberto, Jorginho Paulista & Da Silva), countryman Dida were banned for a year, and 3 youths player were banned for 6 months. The ban later reduced, and on 13 January 2002, he played the first league match of the season, along with Sergio Bernardo Almiron replaced Gonzalo Martínez and David Pizarro in the 75th minutes. He played his first start of the season on 3 March that lost 1–2 to Atalanta. As the team had Roberto Sosa, David Di Michele, Vincenzo Iaquinta, Roberto Muzzi and Siyabonga Nomvethe as forward, Warley played 5 more league matches in the 2001–02 season. In 2002–03 season, he played 16 league matches.

=== Return to Brazil ===
In mid-2003, Warley returned to São Caetano and played two Campeonato Brasileiro Série A seasons. In 2005, he swapped to Palmeiras. He signed a one-year contract with Série B side Brasiliense in January 2006, and extended for another year on 8 December 2006. In January 2008, he signed a 1-year contract with Náutico but in August left for Brazilian Série B side ABC Futebol Clube. In January 2009, he signed a contract for the whole Campeonato Carioca campaign for Madureira. Warley was released before the start of Brazilian Série D 2009.

In January 2010, he signed a contract with Villa Nova for 2010 Campeonato Mineiro.

== International career ==
Warley played 4 matches for Brazil during the 1999 FIFA Confederations Cup, starting in the group match against New Zealand and also appearing as a substitute during the lost final against Mexico.

== Títulos ==
Atlético Paranaense

- Campeonato Paranaensel: 1998

Grêmio

- Copa do Brasil: 2001
- Campeonato Gaúcho de Futebol: 2001

São Caetano

- Campeonato Paulista: 2004

Brasiliense

- Campeonato Brasiliense de Futebol: 2007

Treze

- Campeonato Paraibano: 2011

Campinense

- Campeonato Paraibano: 2012

Botafogo-PB

- Campeonato Paraibano: 2013, 2017
- Campeonato Brasileiro Série D: 2013
