= Flamingo Resort and Spa (Santa Rosa, California) =

Hotel in Santa Rosa, California

Flamingo Resort & Spa
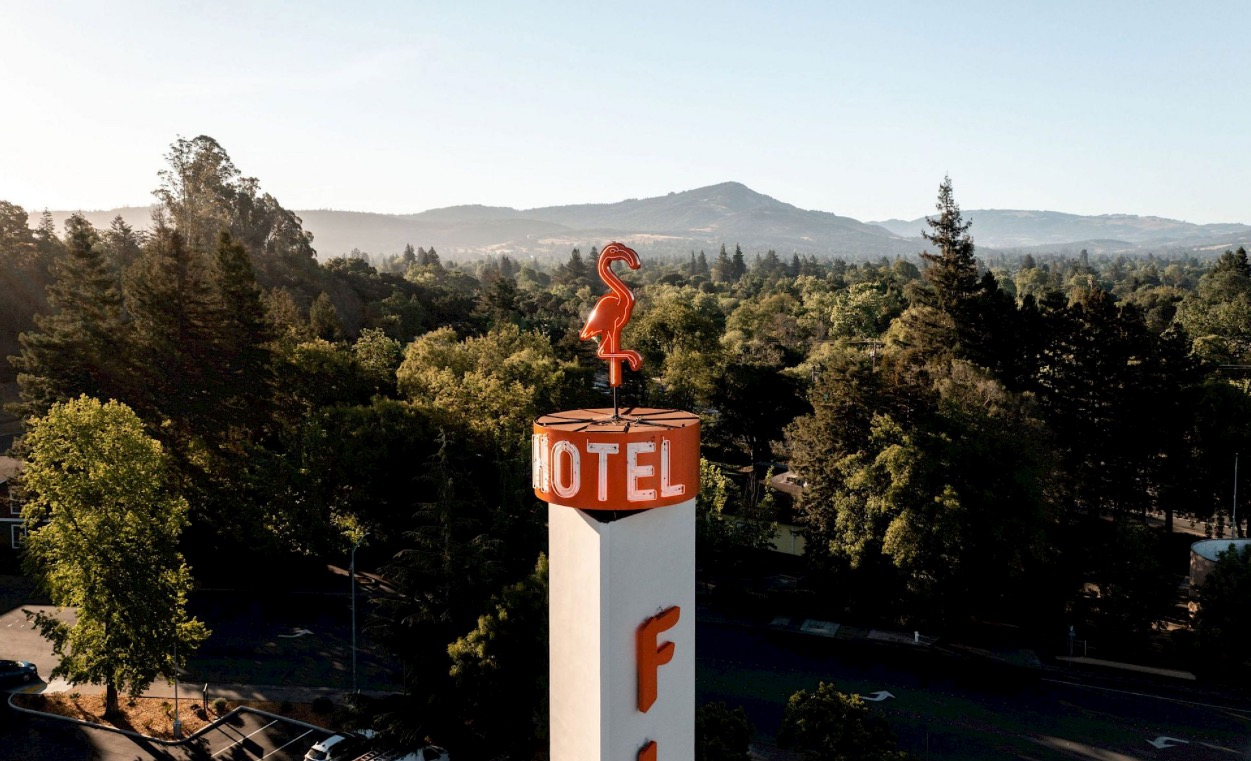
- The Flamingo Resort & Spa neon sign in Santa Rosa, California, designated a local landmark in 1997

- Location within California
- Hotel chain: Hilton Tapestry Collection

General information
- Location: Santa Rosa, California, U.S., 2777 Fourth Street, Santa Rosa, California 95405, U.S.
- Coordinates: 38°27′06″N 122°41′19″W
- Opening: 1957
- Owner: Palm House Hospitality

Design and construction
- Architect: Homer A. Rissman
- Developer: Garden Hotels Company (Hugh Codding)

Other information
- Number of rooms: 170

Website
- Official website

Flamingo Resort & Spa is a historic mid-century modern hotel in Santa Rosa, California, opened in 1957. Designed by architect Homer A. Rissman, the property is noted for a wheel-and-spoke site plan with guestroom wings arranged around a central S-shaped pool courtyard, reflecting post-war resort planning in Northern California. Developed by Hugh Codding’s Garden Hotels Company, the resort became a Sonoma County gathering place in the late 1950s and 1960s, hosting civic galas, dinner-theater productions, club events, and other public functions.

== History and architecture ==
Plans for a modern “garden hotel” on Santa Rosa’s Highway 12 corridor emerged in the 1950s as auto tourism expanded. Rissman’s design combined low-rise guestroom wings, landscaped courts, and a curvilinear pool to organize circulation and outdoor recreation. The complex also featured a prominent freestanding neon sign tower that became a local wayfinding landmark.

When the hotel opened in June 1957, the Santa Rosa Chamber of Commerce relocated its offices to the property. Early events included a “Flamingo Girl” beauty pageant, the establishment of the members-only Empire Club and Cabana Club, and the inaugural “Golden Deed Ball,” a civic fundraiser attended by nearly 900 guests, including actor Charles Coburn.

In its early decades, the hotel hosted community events, beauty contests, touring performances, charity balls, and social gatherings. Local reporting has also documented celebrity appearances and public events that contributed to the property’s reputation as a regional social venue.

== Preservation and renovations ==
The Flamingo’s neon sign was designated a local historic landmark by the City of Santa Rosa in the 1990s. Subsequent restoration efforts have focused on retaining its original profile and lighting characteristics. Periodic property renovations have modernized building systems, guest rooms, meeting spaces, and public areas while preserving the hotel’s mid-century character. A major renovation program announced in 2019 was completed in 2021.

== National Register of Historic Places ==
On September 20, 2021, the Flamingo Hotel was listed on the National Register of Historic Places under Criterion A, for Community Planning and Development, and Criterion C, for Architecture. The listing recognized the property’s role in Santa Rosa’s post-war growth and its mid-century modern design associated with architect Homer A. Rissman.

== Cultural impact ==
The Flamingo Resort has been described in local and regional coverage as part of Santa Rosa’s mid-century leisure culture, with its pool courtyard, neon signage, civic events, and celebrity associations contributing to its public identity. Recent preservation and lighting upgrades to the neon sign have also been framed as part of broader efforts to conserve roadside modernism and community landmarks in Sonoma County.

== See also ==
- Flamingo (disambiguation)
- Mid-century modern architecture
- National Register of Historic Places listings in Sonoma County, California
