= Cruzeiro Esporte Clube (PB) =

Brazilian football club

Cruzeiro de Itaporanga
- Full name: Cruzeiro Esporte Clube (PB)
- Nickname(s): Raposa do sertão Azulão do Vale
- Founded: October 28, 1969
- Ground: Estádio José Sobrinho Barros, Itaporanga, Paraíba state, Brazil
- Capacity: 3,500
Home colors	Away colors

Cruzeiro de Itaporanga Esporte Clube (PB), commonly known as Cruzeiro da Paraíba, is a Brazilian football club based in Itaporanga, Paraíba state. Its name is a tribute to Cruzeiro Esporte Clube.

== Honours ==
- Campeonato Paraibano Third Division
  - Winners (1): 2023
