= Japanese submarine I-362 =

History

Japan
- Name: Submarine No. 5462
- Builder: Mitsubishi, Kobe, Japan
- Laid down: 17 March 1943
- Renamed: I-362 on 20 October 1943
- Launched: 29 November 1943
- Completed: 23 May 1944
- Commissioned: 23 May 1944
- Fate: Sunk by USS Fleming, 14 January 1945
- Stricken: 10 April 1945

General characteristics
- Class & type: Type D1 submarine
- Displacement: 1,440 long tons (1,463 t) surfaced; 2,215 long tons (2,251 t) submerged
- Length: 73.50 m (241 ft 2 in) overall
- Beam: 8.90 m (29 ft 2 in)
- Draft: 4.76 m (15 ft 7 in)
- Propulsion: 2 × Kampon Mk.23B Model 8 diesels; 1,850 bhp surfaced; 1,200 shp submerged; 2 shafts
- Speed: 13.0 knots (24.1 km/h) surfaced; 6.5 knots (12.0 km/h) submerged
- Range: 15,000 nmi (28,000 km) at 10 knots (19 km/h) surfaced; 120 nmi (220 km) at 3 knots (5.6 km/h) submerged
- Test depth: 75 m (246 ft)
- Boats & landing craft carried: 2 x Daihatsu-class landing craft
- Capacity: 85 tons freight
- Complement: 55
- Sensors & processing systems: 1 × Type 22 surface search radar; 1 × Type 13 early warning radar
- Armament: 1 × 14 cm/40 11th Year Type naval gun; 2 × Type 96 25mm AA guns

I-362 was an Imperial Japanese Navy Type D1 transport submarine. Completed and commissioned in May 1944, she served in World War II and conducted transport missions between Japan and outlying islands until she was sunk in January 1945.

== Construction and commissioning ==
I-362 was laid down on 17 March 1943 by Mitsubishi at Kobe, Japan, with the name Submarine No. 5462. She was renamed I-362 on 20 October 1943 and provisionally attached to the Yokosuka Naval District that day. She was launched on 29 November 1943 and was attached to the Kure Naval District on 23 April 1944. She was completed and commissioned on 23 May 1944.

== Service history ==
Upon commissioning, I-362 again was attached to the Yokosuka Naval District and was assigned to Submarine Squadron 11 for workups. With her workups complete, she was reassigned to Submarine Squadron 7 on 15 August 1944.

=== Transport missions ===
On 21 August 1944, I-362 departed Yokosuka bound for Nauru on her first transport mission. She arrived at Nauru on 14 September 1944, loaded 22 tons of ammunition and embarked 85 passengers, and got back underway the same day. She proceeded to Truk, which she reached on 21 September 1944. She unloaded her cargo and disembarked her passengers, then took aboard 83 Imperial Japanese Navy Air Service personnel and departed on 22 September 1944. She returned to Yokosuka on 3 October 1944.

I-362 got underway from Yokosuka on 24 October 1944 for her second transport voyage, this time setting course for Marcus Island, which she reached on 30 October 1944. After unloading supplies, she left the same day bound for Yokosuka, where she arrived on 6 November 1944. She then began an overhaul.

With the overhaul complete, I-362 put to sea from Yokosuka on 1 January 1945 for her third supply voyage. She was scheduled to call at Truk, then proceed to Meleyon Island at Woleai in the Caroline Islands, where she was scheduled to arrive on 21 January 1945.

=== Loss ===
On 13 January 1945, the United States Navy destroyer escort USS Fleming (DE-32) was in the eastern Caroline Islands as one of two escorts for two merchant tankers making a voyage from Ulithi Atoll to Eniwetok when she established radar contact on an unidentified vessel at a range of 14,000 yards (12,800 m). Fleming closed the range and challenged the vessel at a range of 4,000 yards (3,700 m), but the vessel did not reply. Fleming continued to close, and lost radar contact at a range of 1,900 yards (1,700 m), but then immediately acquired a sonar contact, suggesting that the vessel was a submarine that had submerged. Closing to 1,000 yards (914 m), Fleming illuminated the area in the direction of the contact with a searchlight, but her crew saw nothing on the surface. She then dropped a pattern of depth charges, followed by four Hedgehog attacks — each of 24 projectiles — against the submarine. Her last Hedgehog attack was just after midnight on 14 January 1945, and resulted in three underwater explosions followed by a deep, rumbling explosion that disabled Fleming′s sound gear. Fleming′s crew then observed debris and an oil slick on the surface, marking the sinking of the submarine with the loss of all hands at 12°08′N 154°27′E.

The submarine Fleming sank probably was I-362. On 15 March 1945, the Imperial Japanese Navy declared I-362 to be presumed lost with all hands off the Caroline Islands. She was stricken from the Navy list on 10 April 1945.

== Sources ==
- Hackett, Bob & Kingsepp, Sander. IJN Submarine I-362: Tabular Record of Movement. Retrieved on September 17, 2020.
