= Flanders (disambiguation) =

Flanders is the country of the Flemings; for several decades, it has also been a community and region in Belgium. Geographically and historically, it has also covered parts of France and the Netherlands.

Flanders may also refer to:

== Places ==
=== Americas ===
- Indian Flanders (Flandes Indiano), an old name for Chile given during the Arauco War

==== United States ====
- Flanders, Louisiana
- Flanders, Michigan
- Flanders, New Jersey
- Flanders, New York
- Flanders, a village in the town of East Lyme, Connecticut
- Flanders, a village in Litchfield County, Connecticut

=== Europe ===
- Flanders, a townland in County Londonderry, Northern Ireland
- County of Flanders, a historical county of the Low Countries, which included part of the north of modern-day France and the extreme south-west of the modern Netherlands
- East Flanders, a province of Flanders, one of the three regions of modern-day Belgium
- Flanders Fields, the battlefields of World War I in northern France and north-western Belgium
- Flemish Community, one of the three Communities of Belgium, called Flanders
- Flemish Region, one of the three Regions of Belgium, called Flanders
- French Flanders, in the northern French department of Nord in the region of Hauts-de-France
- West Flanders, the westernmost province of the Flemish Region, also named Flanders, in modern-day Belgium
- Zeelandic Flanders in the Netherlands

== People ==
- Flanders (surname), for a list of people with the name
- Raúl Hernández Barrón, Mexican suspected drug lord, nicknamed "Flanders 1"

== Arts, entertainment, and media ==
=== Literature ===
- "In Flanders Fields", a 1915 World War I poem by Lt-Col John McCrae
- In Flanders Fields: The 1917 Campaign, a book by historian Leon Wolff
- Moll Flanders, a 1722 novel, and the eponymous protagonist, by Daniel Defoe

=== Other uses in arts, entertainment, and media ===
- Flanders (band), a.k.a. Deflect, an Italian electronic/dance group
- Flanders (film), by French filmmaker Bruno Dumont
- Flandre Scarlet, a vampire from the Touhou Project game series
- Ned Flanders, a character from The Simpsons franchise

== Other uses ==
- Flanders Automobile Company, a US-American automobile manufacturer that operated in Detroit from 1910 to 1913
- Flanders (horse), an American racehorse
- Flanders, a common fig cultivar
- MS Flanders, a ferry in service under this name in 2002
- FLANDERS (Flinders Handedness Survey), see Handedness#Measurement

== See also ==
- Flemish (disambiguation)
