= Nouveau Flamenco =

Nouveau Flamenco may refer to one of the following.

- New flamenco, a music style fusing flamenco with other forms of music
- Nouveau Flamenco (album), an album by Ottmar Liebert.

== See also ==
- New Flamenco (ship)
- Flamenco (disambiguation)
