= Fleming =

Fleming may refer to:

== Places ==
=== Australia ===
- Fleming, Northern Territory, a town and a locality

=== Canada ===
- Fleming, Saskatchewan
- Fleming Island (Saskatchewan)

=== Egypt ===
- Fleming (neighborhood), a neighborhood in Alexandria

=== Greenland ===
- Fleming Fjord

=== Italy ===
- Fleming (Rome), a neighborhood

=== United States ===
- Fleming, Colorado
- Fleming, Georgia
- Fleming, Kansas
- Fleming, Kentucky, a predecessor of Fleming-Neon, Kentucky, in Letcher County
- Fleming County, Kentucky
- Fleming, Missouri
- Fleming, New York
- Fleming, Ohio

=== Moon ===
- Fleming (crater), a lunar crater

== People ==
- Fleming (surname)
- Flemings, demonym for the Flemish people of Flanders, Belgium
- Clan Fleming, a Scottish clan
- Fleming (noble family), a Finnish noble family

== Other uses ==
- Fleming Building, a building in Des Moines, Iowa, United States
- Fleming College, a college in Peterborough, Ontario, Canada
- Fleming Companies, Inc, an American food supply company
- USS Fleming, more than one United States Navy ship
- Fleming: The Man Who Would Be Bond, 2014 TV mini-series
- Sir Sandford Fleming College, a College of Applied Arts and Technology in Peterborough, Ontario, Canada
- Fleming Prize Lecture, awarded annually by the Microbiology Society

== See also ==
- Fläming, Germany
- Flamengo (disambiguation)
- Flanders (disambiguation)
- Flemming, a surname
- Flemyng, a surname
- Fleming coat of arms, a Polish coat of arms
- Flemish
