= Richard Britnell =

British historian (1944–2013)

Richard Britnell FRHistS FBA
- Richard Britnell
- Born: Richard Hugh Britnell; 21 April 1944; Wrexham, Wales
- Died: 13 December 2013 (aged 69)
- Spouse: Jenny Britnell (m. 1973; died 2011)

Academic background
- Education: Clare College, Cambridge

Academic work
- Discipline: History
- Sub-discipline: Economic history; medieval English history
- Institutions: University of Durham
- Notable works: The Commercialisation of English Society, 1000–1500 (1993); The McFarlane Legacy (1995)

Richard Hugh Britnell (21 April 1944 – 17 December 2013) was Professor (later Professor Emeritus) of the Department of History, University of Durham. An economic historian, his work demonstrated that "commerce played an essential part in medieval life". His obituary in The Guardian stated that "Not many academics can be said to have moved the boundaries of their subject, yet no one meeting Richard encountered any pretension or flamboyance". He was a prolific author.

== Career ==
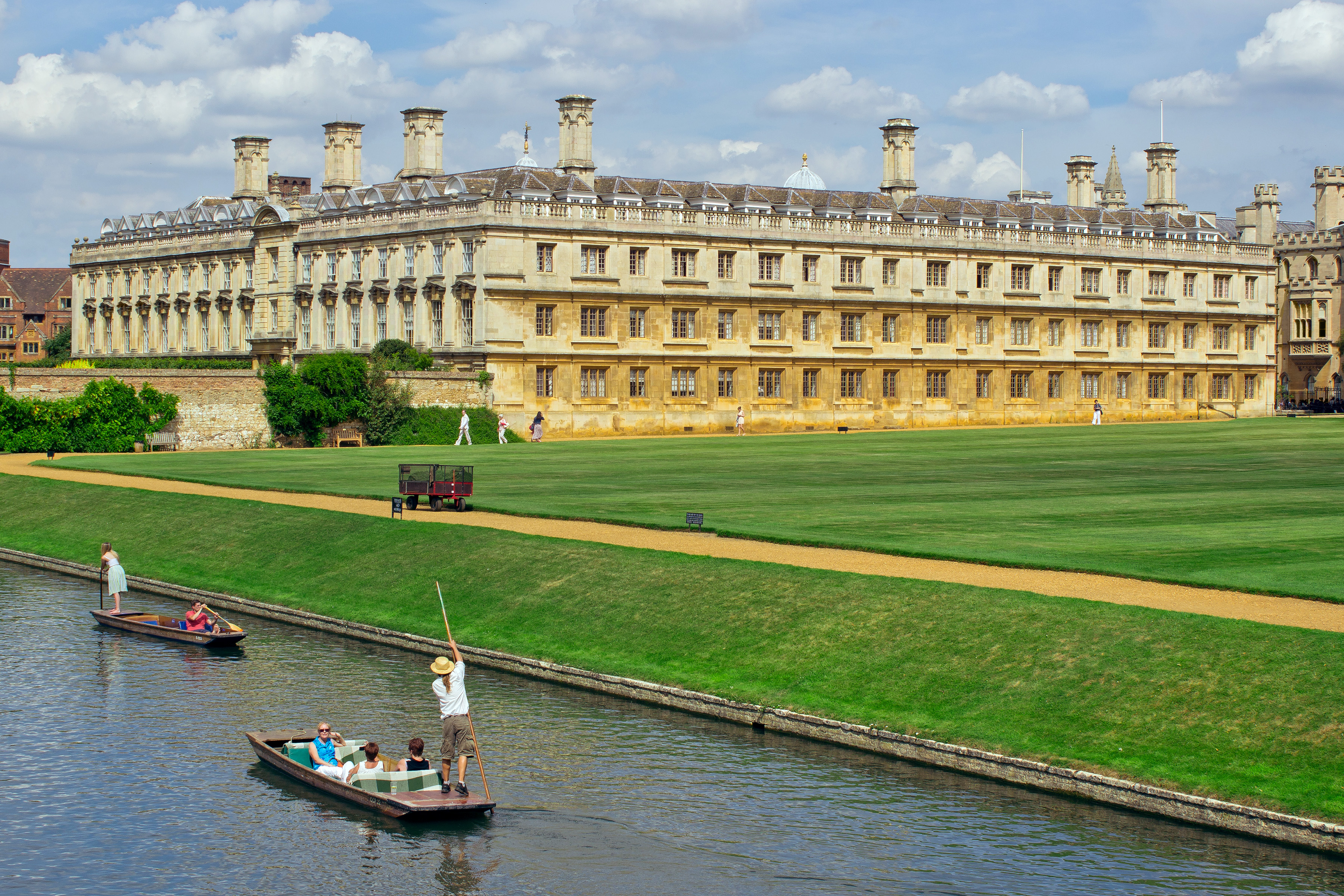
Clare College, Cambridge

Britnell was born on 21 April 1944, the son of Ronald Britnell and Edith (née Mason), both of whom were teachers. He was educated at Bedford Modern School and Clare College, Cambridge.

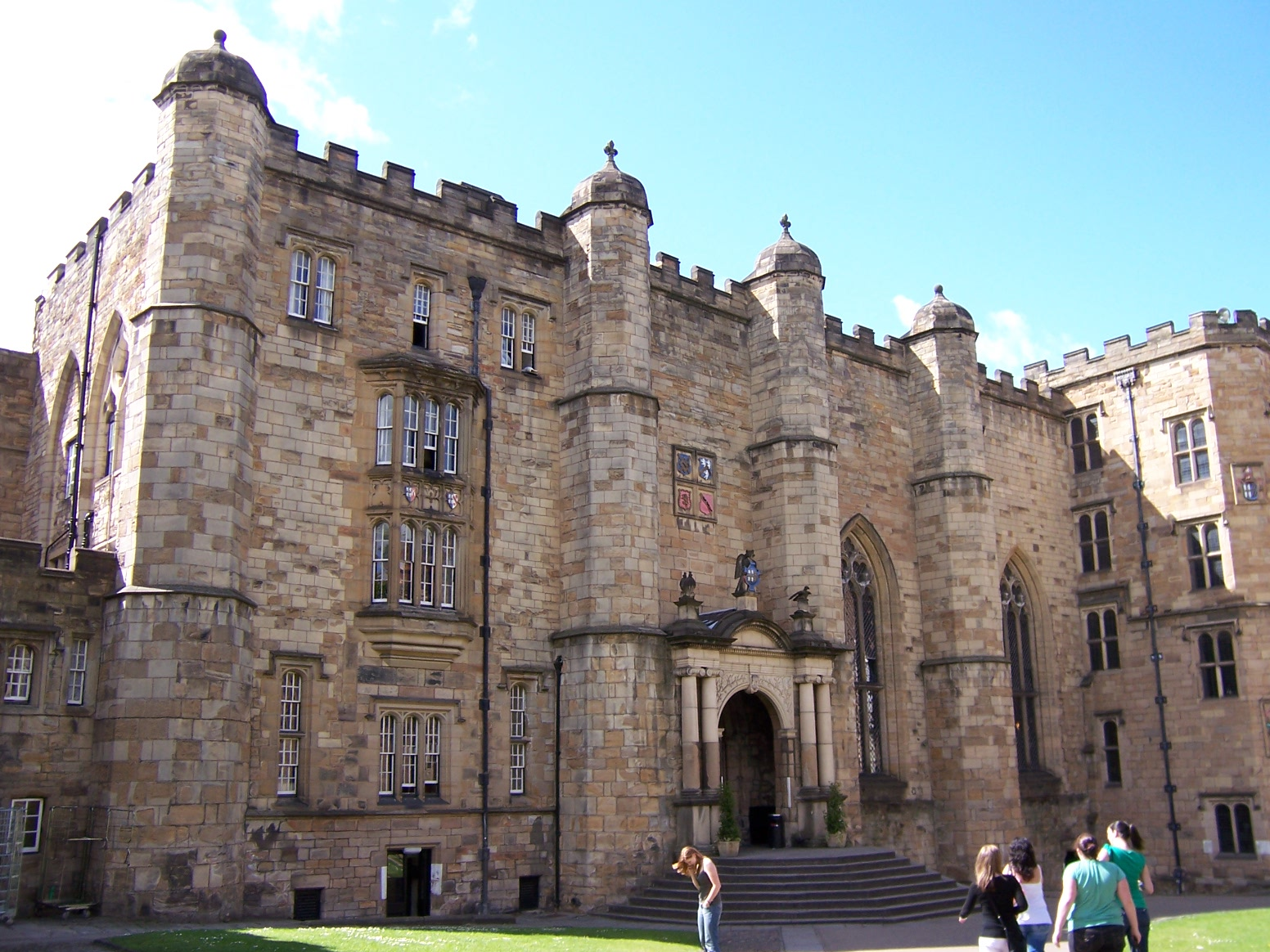
Durham Castle

After Cambridge, Britnell was appointed a lecturer at Durham University, initially in the economic history department. He later moved to the history department where he was made a professor in 1997 although forced to take early retirement in 2003 due to ill health. However, he continued to work as emeritus professor and continued to publish work and be involved in the life of the university and the city.

Britnell's academic work dealt with medieval economic history, a field in which he was regarded as a pioneer. He was a prolific author and in 2005 was elected Fellow of the British Academy. His obituary in The Guardian stated that "Not many academics can be said to have moved the boundaries of their subject, yet no one meeting Richard encountered any pretension or flamboyance".

== Family life ==
In 1973, Britnell married Jenny, a lecturer in French at Durham University; they had two sons. Britnell died on 17 December 2013.

== Selected publications ==
- Britnell, R. H. (1986), Growth and Decline in Colchester, 1300–1525, Cambridge: Cambridge University Press, ISBN 978-0521305723.
- Britnell, R. H. (1993), The Commercialisation of English Society, 1000–1500, Cambridge: Cambridge University Press, ISBN 978-0521141451.
- Britnell, R. H.; Pollard, A. J., eds. (1995), The McFarlane Legacy: Studies in Late-Medieval Politics and Society, Stroud: Sutton, ISBN 978-0312125905.
- Britnell, R. H. (1997), The Closing of the Middle Ages?: England 1471–1529, London: Wiley-Blackwell, ISBN 978-0631165989.
- Britnell, R. H. (2004), Britain and Ireland 1050–1530: Economy and Society, Oxford: Oxford University Press, ISBN 978-0198731450.
- Britnell, R. H. (2009), Markets, Trade and Economic Development in England and Europe, 1050–1550, London: Ashgate, ISBN 978-0754659839.
- Britnell, R. H. (2012), "Bureaucracy and literacy", in Lansing, C.; English, E. D. (eds.), A companion to the medieval world, Chichester: Wiley-Blackwell, pp. 413–434, ISBN 978-1-4051-0922-2.

Professional and academic associations
Preceded by Margaret M. Harvey	Editor of the Surtees Society; 1999–2013	Succeeded by Angus J. L. Winchester
