= Flemming =

Flemming is a surname and a male given name referring, like the more common Fleming, to an inhabitant (or descendant thereof) of Flanders, a region overlapping parts of modern Belgium, France, and the Netherlands. Notable people with the name include:

== Surname ==
- Aida McAnn Flemming, Canadian teacher and writer
- Arthur Flemming, American government official
- Bill Flemming, American sportscaster
- Brett Flemming, Canadian ice hockey player
- Brian Flemming, American film director, playwright, and activist
- Catherine Flemming, German actress
- Dave Flemming, American sportscaster
- Georg Detlev von Flemming, Saxon-Polish general
- Heino Heinrich Graf von Flemming, Saxon and Brandenburg Field Marshal
- Hugh John Flemming, Canadian politician
- James Kidd Flemming, Canadian businessman and politician
- Jane Flemming, Austrian track and field athlete
- Jimmy Flemming, U.S. Virgin Islands sprinter
- John Flemming, English economist
- John Flemming (racing driver), Canadian racing driver
- Margot Flemming, Canadian curler
- Marilies Flemming, Austrian politician
- Michael Anthony Flemming, British physicist
- Paul Flemming, Canadian curler
- Peter Flemming, Canadian actor
- Peter Flemming (artist), Canadian installation artist
- Robert Flemming, English cleric
- Robert F. Flemming Jr., American inventor and sailor
- Sarah Mae Flemming, American civil rights activist
- Scott Flemming, American basketball coach
- Ted Flemming (footballer), Australian rules footballer
- Ted Flemming (politician), Canadian politician
- Thomas Flemming, German swimmer
- Walther Flemming, German biologist
- Will Flemming, American sportscaster
- Zian Flemming, Malaysian footballer

== Given name ==
- Flemming Christensen, Danish footballer
- Flemming Flindt, Danish choreographer
- Flemming Hansen (disambiguation), several people
- Flemming Møller Mortensen (born 1963), Danish politician
- Flemming Østergaard, Danish businessman
- Flemming Povlsen, Danish footballer
- Flemming Rasmussen, Danish producer
- Flemming Viguurs, Dutch singer
