= Flamenco (disambiguation) =

Flamenco is a variety of accompanied dance native to Spain.

Flamenco may also refer to:

== Places ==
- Flamenco, Culebra, Puerto Rico, a barrio in Culebra, a municipality of Puerto Rico

== Films ==
- Flamenco (1952 film), a 1952 Spanish documentary film
- Flamenco (1995 film), a 1995 Spanish documentary film

== Music ==
- "Flamenco" (song), a song by Canadian rock band The Tragically Hip
- Flamenco guitar, a flamenco musical instrument and style
- New Flamenco, a derivative style of music and dance
- "Flamenco" (song), 2024 song by Beyoncé

== Literature ==
- Flamenco (novel), a 1931 work by the British writer Eleanor Smith

== Other uses ==
- Ocean Dream (1972 ship), a cruise ship known by Flamenco and New Flamenco
- Flamenco (apple), a British apple cultivar

== See also ==
- Nouveau Flamenco (disambiguation)
- Flamengo (disambiguation)
