= USS Fleming =

USS Fleming has been the name of more than one United States Navy ship, and may refer to:

- USS Fleming (DE-271), a destroyer escort transferred while under construction to the United Kingdom, which served in the Royal Navy as the frigate HMS Garlies (K475) from 1943 to 1945 and in the U.S. Navy as the destroyer escort USS Garlies (DE-271) from August to October 1945
- USS Fleming (DE-32), a destroyer escort in commission from 1943 to 1945
