= 2011 Campeonato Paraibano =

Campeonato Paraibano de Futebol
- Season: 2011
- Champions: Treze (15th title)
- Relegated: Desportiva Guarabira; Miramar
- Matches: 96
- Goals: 300 (3.13 per match)
- Top goalscorer: Cléo (Treze) (15 goals)
- Biggest home win: CSP 5–0 Esporte (21 April)
- Biggest away win: Miramar 1–6 Sousa (24 March)
- Highest scoring: Miramar 1–6 Sousa (24 March); Treze 5–2 Desportiva Guarabira (27 March)

The 2011 edition of Campeonato Paraibano's First Division was contested by 10 clubs and started on February 2, 2011. Treze successfully defended their 2010 season title.

== Format ==
It'll be played in two stages: the first one is a standard round-robin tournament in which all teams play each other in home and away fixtures. The bottom 2 clubs of this stage will be relegated to 2012 Campeonato Paraibano Second Division. The second stage will be played in a play-off format, where the 4 best-placed teams from the first stage will compete.

If the champion from both stages ends up being the same team, the said team will be declared the 2011 Campeonato Paraibano champion. Otherwise, the winners from the two stages will play a two-legged play-off to decide the champion. In any of the play-off stages, the clubs with the best records in the first stage are higher seeded, advancing in case of a draw.

== Team information ==
Team	City	Stadium	Capacity	2010 season
Auto Esporte	João Pessoa	Almeidão	40,000	Campeonato Paraibano 8th place
Botafogo	João Pessoa	Almeidão	40,000	Campeonato Paraibano runners-up
Campinense	Campina Grande	Amigão	35,000	Campeonato Paraibano 3rd place
CSP	João Pessoa	Almeidão	40,000	Campeonato Paraibano Second Division Champions (promoted)
Desportiva Guarabira	Guarabira	Sílvio Porto	4,000	Campeonato Paraibano 7th place
Esporte	Patos	José Cavalcanti	8,000	Campeonato Paraibano 6th place
Miramar	Cabedelo	Estádio da Graça	5,000	Campeonato Paraibano Second Division runners-up (promoted)
Nacional	Patos	José Cavalcanti	8,000	Campeonato Paraibano 5th place
Sousa	Sousa	Marizão	10,000	Campeonato Paraibano 4th place
Treze	Campina Grande	Amigão	35,000	Campeonato Paraibano Champions

== First stage ==
=== Standings ===
The 2011 Campeonato Paraibano first stage began on February 2 and ended on May 1.

Pos	Team	Pld	W	D	L	GF	GA	GD	Pts	Qualification or relegation
1	Treze (C, A)	18	13	5	0	39	12	+27	44	Qualification for Second Stage
2	CSP (A)	18	11	4	3	38	20	+18	37	Qualification for Second Stage
3	Campinense (A)	18	11	2	5	40	26	+14	35	Qualification for Second Stage
4	Botafogo-PB (A)	18	9	4	5	31	20	+11	31	Qualification for Second Stage
5	Sousa	18	7	5	6	28	26	+2	26	
6	Esporte	18	6	5	7	24	29	−5	23	
7	Nacional de Patos	18	5	5	8	24	29	−5	20	
8	Auto Esporte	18	3	6	9	20	37	−17	15	
9	Desportiva Guarabira (R)	18	2	6	10	20	32	−12	12	Relegation to 2012 Campeonato Paraibano Second Division
10	Miramar (R)	18	0	4	14	16	49	−33	4	Relegation to 2012 Campeonato Paraibano Second Division

Updated to match(es) played on 8 June 2011. Source: Federação Paraibana de Futebol
Rules for classification: 1st points; 2nd wins; 3rd goals scored; 4th goals scored in away head-to-head matches; 5th head-to-head results; 6th least red cards received; 7th least yellow cards received; 8th extra match
(A) Advance to a further round; (C) Champions; (R) Relegated

=== Results ===
Home \ Away	AUT	BPB	CPN	CSP	DSG	ESP	MIR	NAC	SOU	TRZ
Auto Esporte		2–2	0–4	1–1	3–3	1–2	2–2	0–2	3–1	0–4
Botafogo-PB	4–1		0–0	2–1	1–0	3–2	5–1	1–1	3–0	0–2
Campinense	3–2	4–2		1–0	4–1	4–1	3–0	2–0	2–1	1–2
CSP	1–1	1–0	3–2		2–1	5–0	4–1	3–0	1–0	1–2
Desportiva Guarabira	0–1	0–2	3–0	1–1		1–1	1–0	2–2	2–3	0–1
Esporte	2–0	0–2	2–3	2–3	2–2		1–0	1–0	2–0	1–1
Miramar	1–1	1–2	1–3	2–4	1–1	0–2		3–3	1–6	1–2
Nacional de Patos	0–2	2–1	2–1	1–3	2–0	1–1	3–0		2–4	0–1
Sousa	2–0	1–1	2–2	2–3	1–0	1–1	2–1	2–1		0–0
Treze	4–0	1–0	4–1	1–1	5–2	2–1	4–0	2–2	1–1	

Updated to match(es) played on 10 June 2011. Source: Federação Paraibana de Futebol
Legend: Blue = home team win; Yellow = draw; Red = away team win.

== Second stage ==
=== Semifinals ===
First legs were played on 5 May 2011. Return legs were played on 8 May 2011.

Team 1	Agg.	Team 2	1st leg	2nd leg
CSP (2)	3–5	(3) Campinense	3–2	0 – 3
Treze (1)	4–4	(4) Botafogo-PB	0–4	4 – 0

=== Finals ===
Matches were played on 18 and 22 May.

Team 1	Agg.	Team 2	1st leg	2nd leg
Treze (1)	2–2	Campinense (3)	1–1	1–1

=== Botafogo v. Treze ===
In the second stage semifinals, Botafogo and Treze competed. In the first match, Botafogo won 4–0. In the second half of the second match, Treze was winning 3–0 ahead when striker Vavá scored the fourth goal and proceeded to celebrate by mimicking an artillery soldier in front of Botafogo supporters. A fight then ensued, involving even Botafogo's head coach, Maurício Cabedelo. Five players were sent-off – 3 from Treze and 2 from Botafogo. After the game was restarted, Treze's sideback Ferreira and midfielder Doda fell on the ground, claiming injuries. Due to one of the teams not having at least seven players on the field, the match was declared finished with a 4–0 score, which favoured Treze and allowed the Campina Grande side to play in the second stage final against rivals Campinense. Treze and Campinense played, with the aggregate score of 2–2 supposedly giving Treze the title of Campeonato Paraibano champion.

Botafogo judicially accused Treze of trying to fake injuries in order to finish the semifinals second match earlier than the 90 minute mark. The Paraíba state's Court of Sporting Justice (TJDF-PB) decided that Treze would lose its points from the second stage, and that Botafogo would decide the second stage winner spot against Campinense. The second stage finals were scheduled to take place in 19 and 26 June 2011. Treze appealed to the Supreme Court of Sporting Justice (STJD), and on 17 June 2011, it was announced that Treze's appeal was successful and the 19 June match was suspended.

On 30 June 2011, Treze's second stage title was confirmed by the STJD, thus making the Campina Grande side Campeonato Paraibano champions for the fifteenth time.
