= John W. Flanders =

American politician (born 1927)

John W. Flanders Sr.

Member of the New Hampshire House of Representatives from the Rockingham 10th district
- In office 1982–1992

Member of the New Hampshire House of Representatives from the Rockingham 18th district
- In office 1992–2002

Member of the New Hampshire House of Representatives from the Rockingham 79th district
- In office 2002–2004

Member of the New Hampshire House of Representatives from the Rockingham 8th district
- In office 2004–2010

Personal details
- Born: February 4, 1927 (age 99) Lynn, Massachusetts, U.S.
- Party: Democratic; Republican

John Walter Flanders Sr. (born February 4, 1927) is an American politician. He served as a member of the New Hampshire House of Representatives.

== Life and career ==
Flanders was born in Lynn, Massachusetts on February 4, 1927. He was a truck driver.

He served in the New Hampshire House of Representatives from 1982 to 2010.
