= Pegasus EDA 100 Flamingo =

Slovenian ultralight aircraft

EDA 100 Flamingo
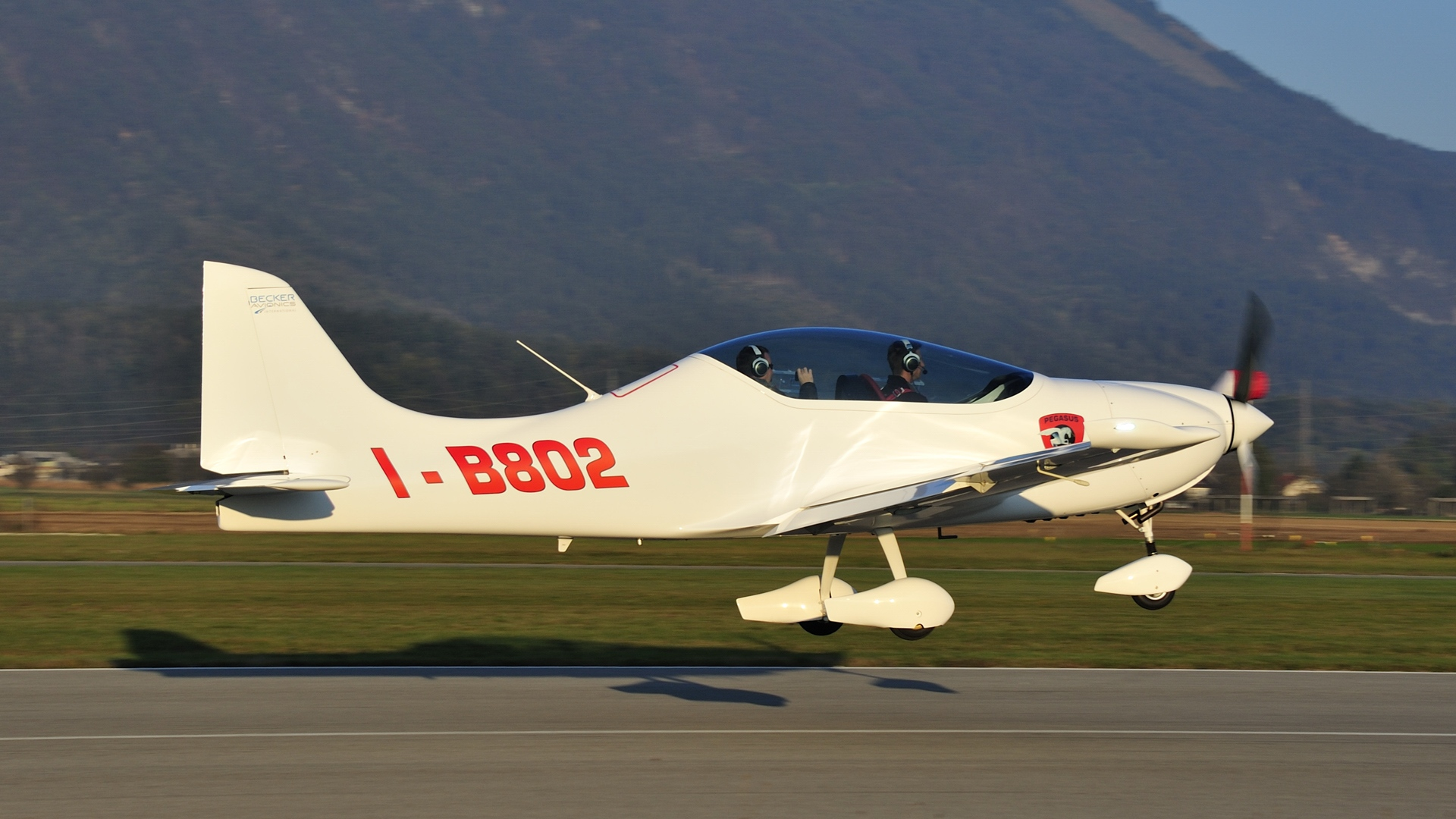

General information
- Type: Ultralight aircraft
- National origin: Slovenia
- Manufacturer: Pegasus d.o.o.
- Status: Development ended (2016)
- Number built: One prototype

History
- Introduction date: 2010
- First flight: Late 2013

The Pegasus EDA 100 Flamingo is a Slovenian ultralight aircraft, that was under development by Pegasus d.o.o. of Branik. The Flamingo was introduced to the public at the AERO Friedrichshafen show in 2010 and was first flown late in 2013. The aircraft was intended to be supplied as a complete ready-to-fly-aircraft and was initially expected to be distributed by Fly Synthesis in Europe.

The company seems to have gone out of business in early 2016 and development ended.

== Design and development ==
The Flamingo was designed to comply with the Fédération Aéronautique Internationale microlight rules and intended as both a touring aircraft for private ownership and a trainer for flying school use. It features a cantilever low-wing, a two-seat tandem enclosed cockpit under a bubble canopy, fixed or optionally retractable tricycle landing gear and a single engine in tractor configuration.

The aircraft is made from carbon composites. Its 8.7 m (28.5 ft) span wing has an area of 10.53 m^{2} (113.3 sq ft) and mounts flaps. The standard engine intended to be used for the production aircraft was the 100 hp (75 kW) Rotax 912ULS four-stroke powerplant, which was expected to give a cruise of 260 km/h (162 mph) for the fixed gear version and 310 km/h (193 mph) for the retractable version.

== Variants ==
EDA 100 Flamingo Fixed Gear
Model with fixed landing gear, first flown in 2013.
EDA 100 Flamingo Retractable Gear
Model with retractable landing gear, not flown.

== Specifications (EDA 100 Flamingo) ==
Data from Bayerl and manufacturer

General characteristics

- Crew: one
- Capacity: one passenger
- Wingspan: 8.7 m (28 ft 7 in)
- Wing area: 10.53 m^{2} (113.3 sq ft)
- Empty weight: 285 kg (628 lb)
- Gross weight: 472.5 kg (1,042 lb)
- Fuel capacity: 100 litres (22 imp gal; 26 US gal)
- Powerplant: 1 × Rotax 912ULS four cylinder, liquid and air-cooled, four stroke aircraft engine, 75 kW (101 hp)

Performance

- Maximum speed: 274 km/h (170 mph, 148 kn)
- Cruise speed: 260 km/h (160 mph, 140 kn)
- Stall speed: 47 km/h (29 mph, 25 kn) flaps 45 degrees
- Never exceed speed: 360 km/h (220 mph, 190 kn)
- Range: 1,508 km (937 mi, 814 nmi)
- Service ceiling: 6,150 m (20,180 ft)
- g limits: +6.2/-3.1
- Maximum glide ratio: 17:1
- Rate of climb: 8 m/s (1,600 ft/min)
- Wing loading: 44.87 kg/m^{2} (9.19 lb/sq ft)
