= Miramar Esporte Clube =

Miramar
- Full name: Miramar Esporte Clube
- Nickname(s): Tubarão do Porto; Time de Cabedelo
- Founded: March 28, 1928 (96 years ago)
- Ground: Estádio da Graça, João Pessoa, Paraíba state, Brazil
- Capacity: 6,000
Home colors	Away colors

Miramar Esporte Clube, commonly known as Miramar, is a Brazilian football club based in Cabedelo, Paraíba state.

== History ==
The club was founded on March 28, 1928. Miramar won the Campeonato Paraibano Second Level in 2001.

== Honours ==
- Campeonato Paraibano Second Division
  - Winners (1): 2001
- Campeonato Paraibano Third Division
  - Winners (1): 2024

== Stadium ==
Miramar Esporte Clube play their home games at Estádio Leonardo Vinagre da Silveira, commonly known as Estádio da Graça, located in João Pessoa. The stadium has a maximum capacity of 6,000 people.
