= Flamingo Bay =

Flamingo Bay may refer to:

Places:

- Flamingo Bay, Florida - see List of places in Florida: F
- Flamingo Bay, Grenada, near Molinere Underwater Sculpture Park
- Flamingo Bay, Wadala, Mumbai, India
- Flamingo Bay, New Guinea - see Lorentz River
- Flamingo Bay, an elliptical depression (Carolina Bay)

Other uses:

- Flamingo Bay, a fishing boat acquired and renamed MSA Gunundaal by the Royal Australian Navy
- RV Flamingo Bay, a research vessel which searched for the sunken World War II Japanese submarine I-124
- Flamingo Bay, an exhibit of the Fort Worth Zoo
