= Flamenco, Culebra, Puerto Rico =

Barrio of Puerto Rico

Flamenco
- Barrio
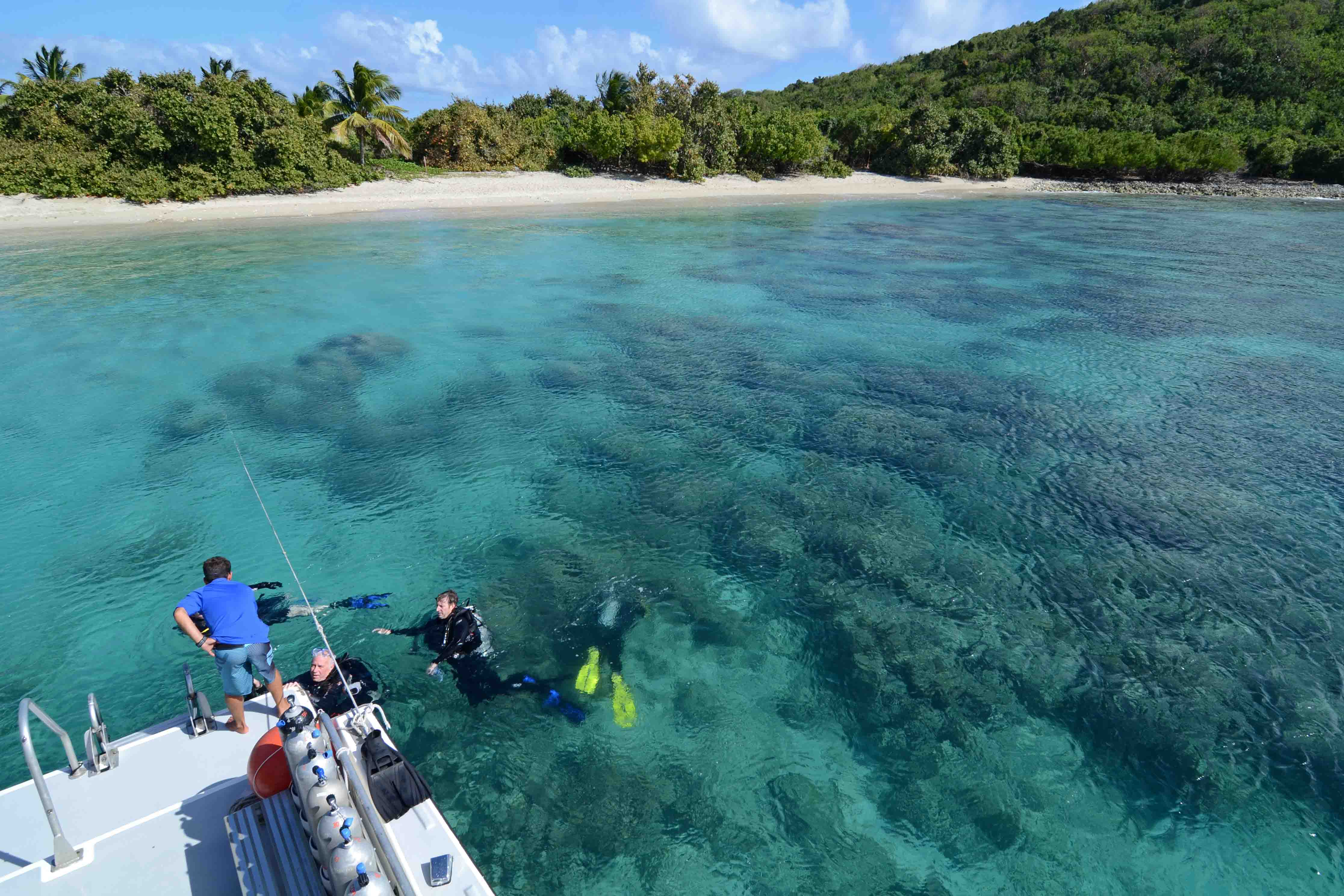
- Diving in Culebra

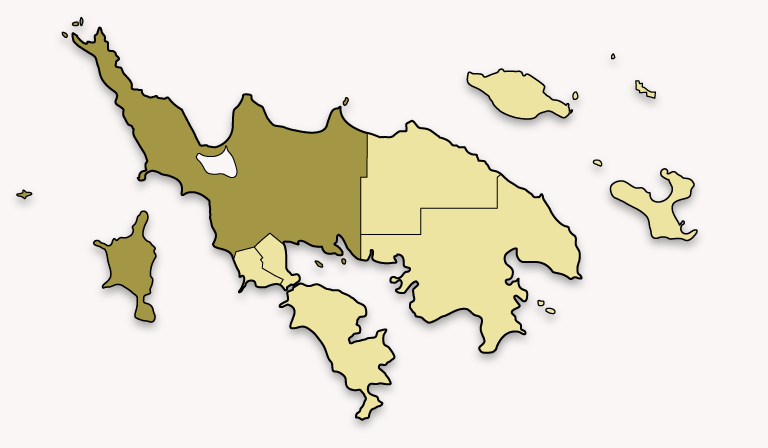
- Location of Flamenco within the municipality of Culebra highlighted

- Location of Culebra in Puerto Rico
- Coordinates: 18°19′08″N 65°21′12″W
- Commonwealth: Puerto Rico
- Municipality: Culebra

Area
  - Total: 76.77 sq mi (198.8 km^{2})
  - Land: 4.88 sq mi (12.6 km^{2})
  - Water: 71.89 sq mi (186.2 km^{2})
- Elevation: 0 ft (0 m)

Population (2010)
  - Total: 1,048
  - Density: 214.8/sq mi (82.9/km^{2})
- Source: 2010 Census
- Time zone: UTC−4 (AST)
- ZIP Code: 00775

Flamenco is a barrio in the island-municipality of Culebra, Puerto Rico. Its population in 2010 was 1,048.

Historical population
| Census | Pop. | Note | %± |
|---|---|---|---|
| 1930 | 256 | | — |
| 1940 | 174 | | −32.0% |
| 1950 | 45 | | −74.1% |
| 1960 | 17 | | −62.2% |
| 1970 | 0 | | −100.0% |
| 1980 | 262 | | — |
| 1990 | 598 | | 128.2% |
| 2000 | 885 | | 48.0% |
| 2010 | 1,048 | | 18.4% |
U.S. Decennial Census; 1899 (shown as 1900) 1910-1930; 1930-1950 1980-2000 2010

== Sectors ==
Barrios (which are, in contemporary times, roughly comparable to minor civil divisions) in turn are further subdivided into smaller local populated place areas/units called sectores (sectors in English). The types of sectores may vary, from normally sector to urbanización to reparto to barriada to residencial, among others.

The following sectors are in Flamenco barrio:

Extensión Villa Muñeco, Sector Las Delicias, Sector Resaca, Sector Romana, Sector Villa Flamenco, and Sector Villa Muñeco.

== Gallery ==
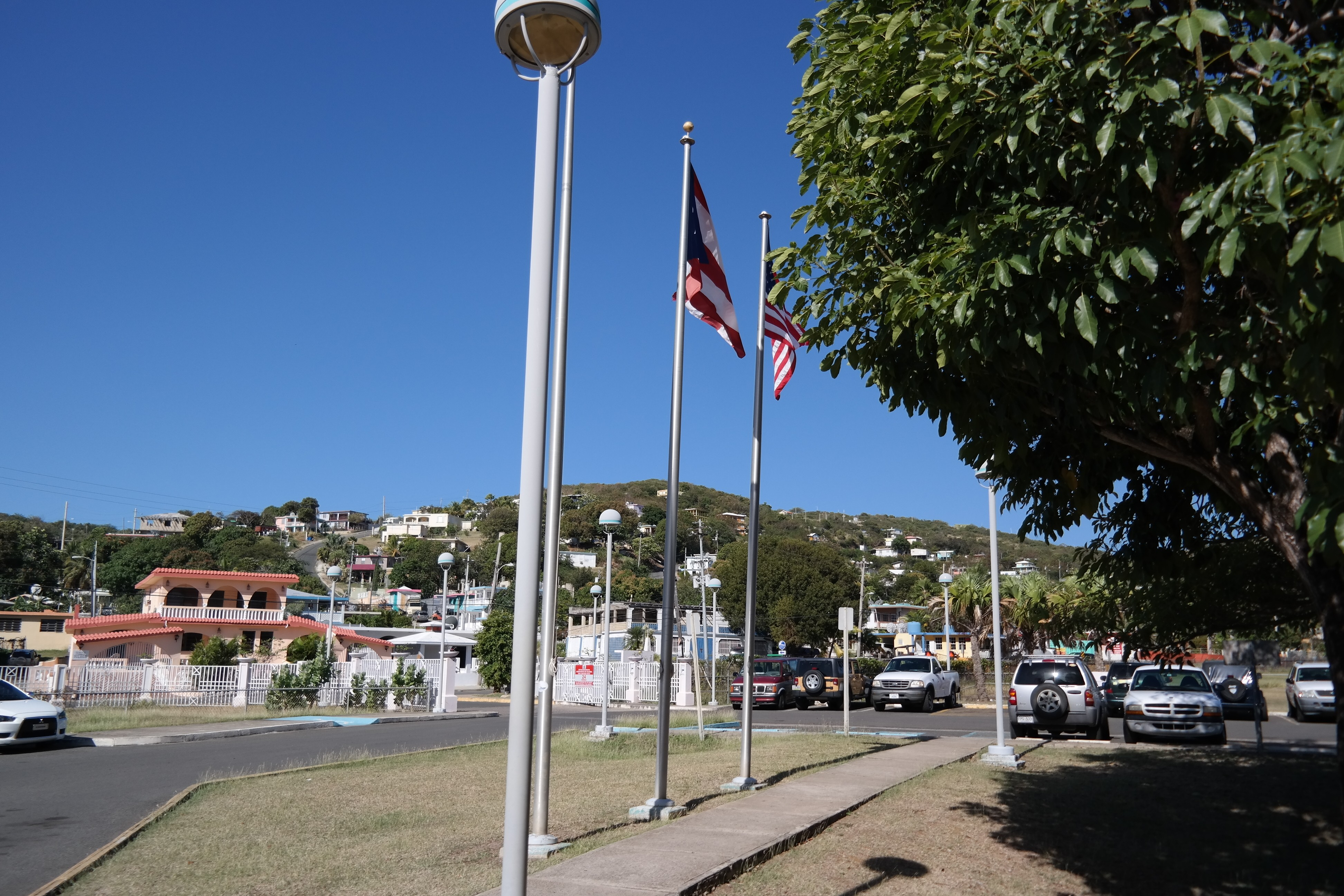
Street and homes in Flamenco

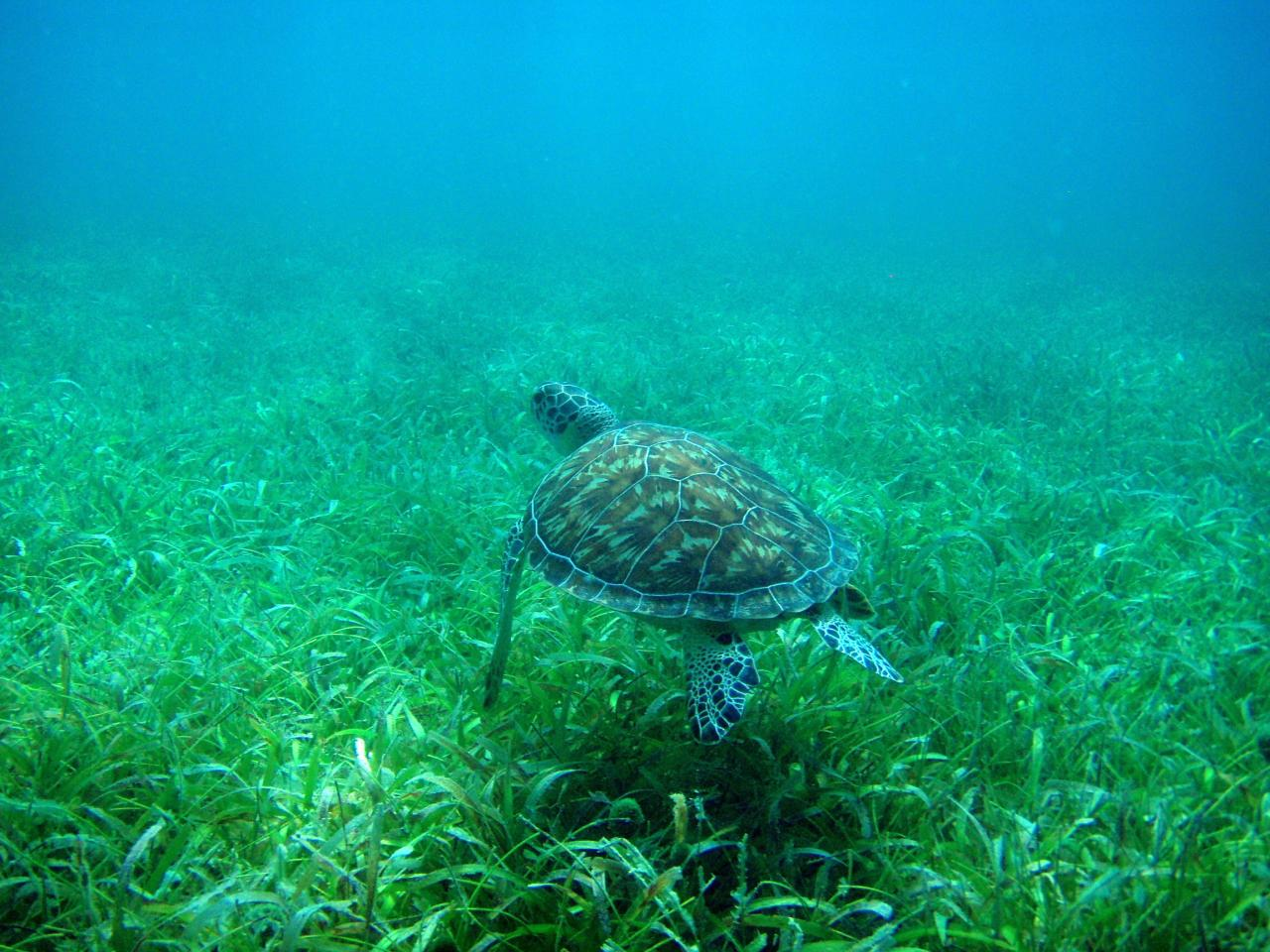
Turtle at Tamarindo Beach

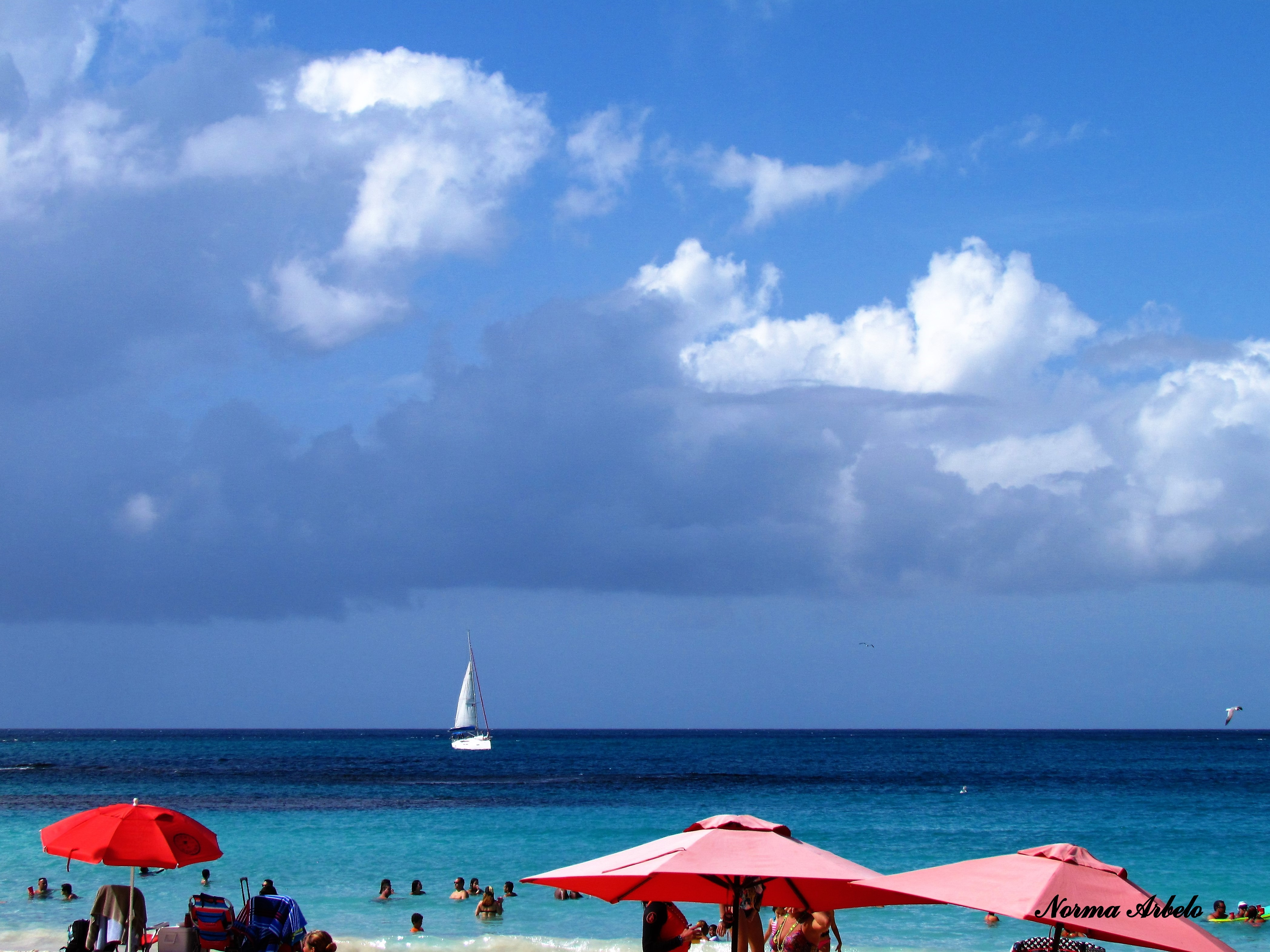
Flamenco Beach

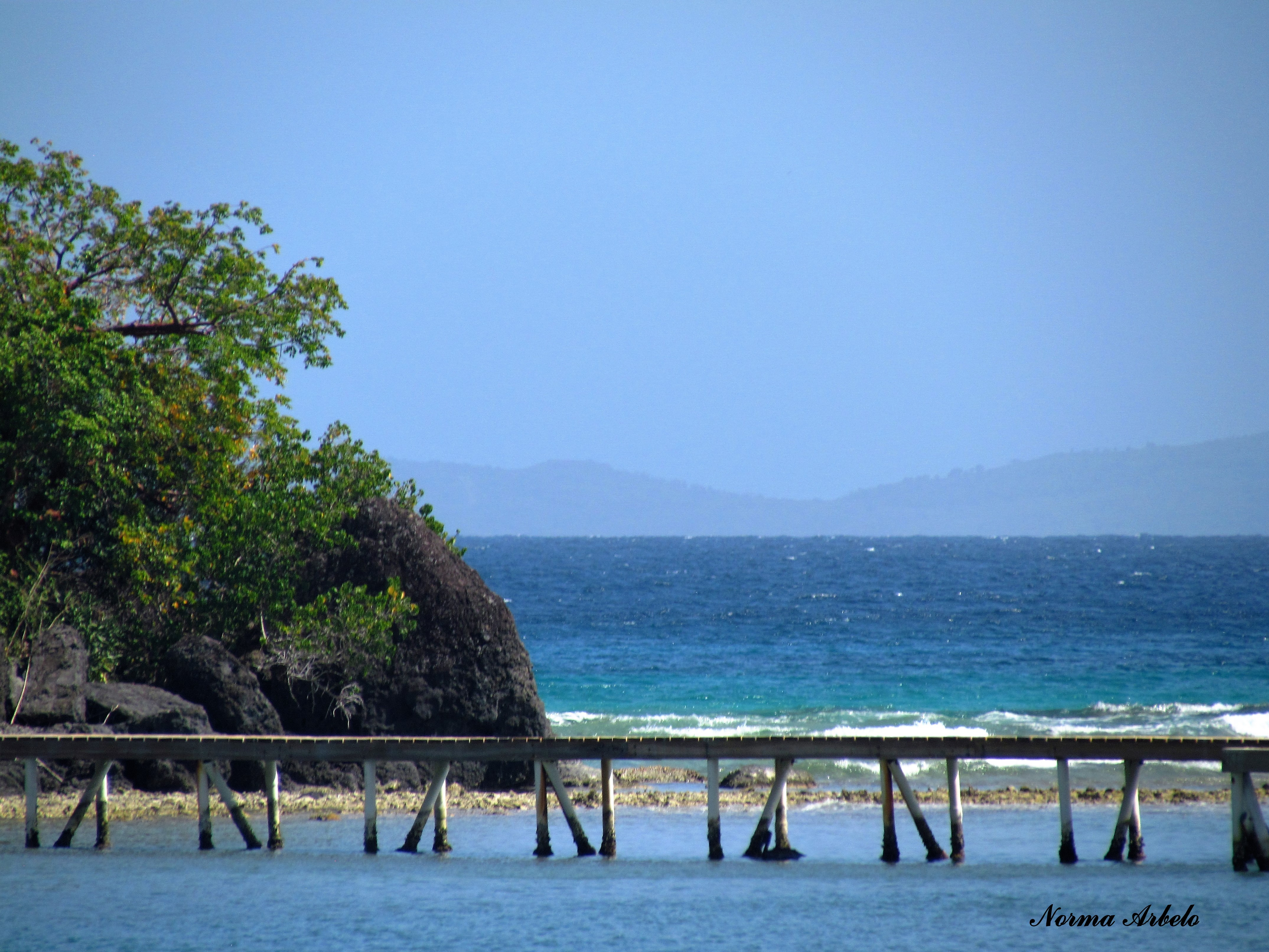
Pier at Flamenco Beach

== See also ==
- List of communities in Puerto Rico
- List of barrios and sectors of Culebra, Puerto Rico
