= Alexander Fleming (doctor) =

Scottish physician and educator (1824–1875)

Alexander Fleming, M.D. (1824 Edinburgh – 21 August 1875) was a Scottish physician, educator, researcher and author whose research led to the development of Fleming's tincture.

Born in Scotland, Fleming studied medicine at the University of Edinburgh, where he graduated in 1844. His chief work was his college essay on the 'Physiological and Medicinal Properties of Aconitum Napellus,' Lond. 1845, which led to the introduction of a tincture of aconite of uniform strength known as Fleming's tincture.

Having spent some years at Cork as professor of materia medica in the Queen's College, he went in 1858 to Birmingham, where he held the honorary office of physician to the Queen's Hospital

Fleming retired due to ill-health in 1873. He died at Brixton, London, on 21 August 1875.

Fleming also published two introductory addresses and two papers in the Dublin Quarterly Journal of Medical Science (on measles of the pig, and on the classification of medicines).
