= Flanders (surname) =

Flanders is an English surname. Notable people with the surname include:

- Angela Flanders (1927–2016), British perfumer
- Benjamin Flanders (1816–1896), American politician
- Dennis Flanders (1915–1994), British artist
- Ed Flanders (1934–1995), American actor
- Harley Flanders (1925–2013), American mathematician
- James E. Flanders (c.1849–1928), American architect
- John W. Flanders Sr. (born 1927), American politician
- Judith Flanders (born 1959), British historian and author
- Laura Flanders (born 1961), English journalist
- Michael Flanders (1922–1975), English actor, broadcaster, and writer
- Peter Flanders, Australian rugby league player
- Ralph Edward Flanders (1880–1970), American engineer and politician
- Stephanie Flanders (born 1968), English journalist
- Walter Flanders (1871–1923), American industrialist

Fictional characters:

- Moll Flanders
- Ned Flanders, a character on The Simpsons

Other uses:

- John Flanders, pseudonym of the Belgian writer Jean Ray (author) (1887–1964)
- John Buchanan (cricketer, born 1953) (born 1953), former coach of the Australia cricket team, has the nickname Ned Flanders, due to a supposed resemblance to the character on The Simpsons
