= USS Fleming (DE-32) =

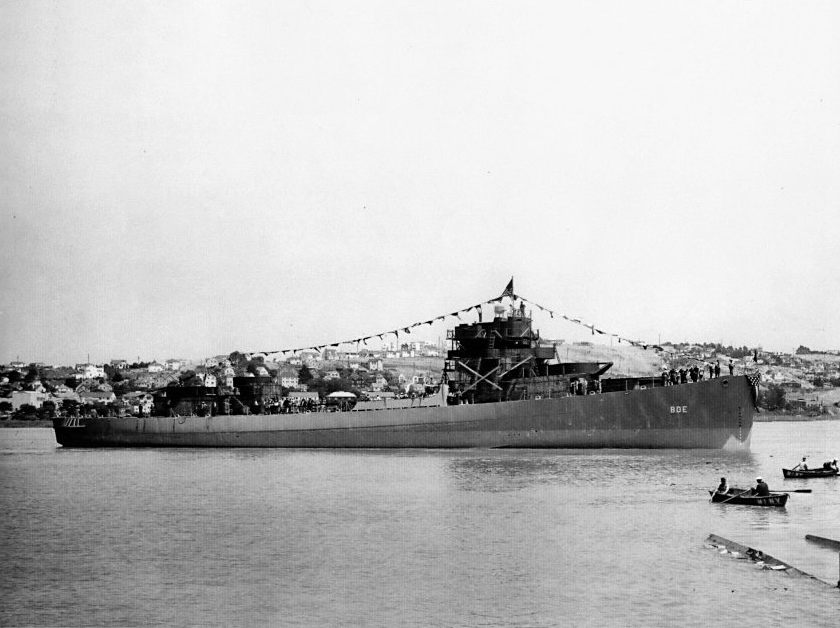
- Fleming after her launch on 16 June 1943

History

United States
- Name: USS Fleming (DE-32)
- Namesake: Richard E. Fleming
- Builder: Mare Island Navy Yard
- Laid down: 24 December 1942
- Launched: 16 June 1943
- Commissioned: 18 September 1943
- Decommissioned: 15 November 1945
- Stricken: 28 November 1945
- Fate: Sold for scrap on 29 January 1948

General characteristics
- Class & type: Evarts class destroyer escort
- Displacement: 1,140 (standard), 1,430 tons (full)
- Length: 283 ft 6 in (86.41 m) (waterline), 289 ft 5 in (88.21 m) (overall))
- Beam: 35 ft 2 in (10.72 m)
- Draft: 11 ft 0 in (3.35 m) (max)
- Propulsion: 4 General Motors Model 16-278A diesel engines with electric drive; 6,000 shp; 2 screws
- Speed: 19 kn (35 km/h)
- Range: 4,150 nm
- Complement: 15 officers, 183 enlisted
- Armament: 3 × 3 in (76 mm) cal Mk 22 dual-purpose guns (1×3), 4 × 1.1-inch/75-caliber gun (1×4), 9 × Oerlikon 20 mm Mk 4 AA cannons, 1 × Hedgehog Projector Mk 10 (144 rounds), 8 × Mk 6 K-gun depth charge projectors, 2 × Mk 9 depth charge tracks

The second USS Fleming (DE-32), and first ship of the name to enter service, was an Evarts-class destroyer escort built for the United States Navy during World War II. While performing convoy and escort duty in the Pacific Ocean she was also able to sink one Japanese submarine and to shoot down several kamikaze planes that intended to crash onto her. For her military prowess under battle conditions, she was awarded four battle stars.

== Design ==
The Evarts-class destroyer escorts were 289 ft 5 in (88.21 m) long overall, and they had a beam of 35 ft 2 in (10.72 m). They had an average draft of 10 ft 1 in (3.07 m) at their full load displacement of 1,416 long tons (1,439 t). Each ship had a normal crew numbered 156 officers and sailors.

Fleming was propelled by a pair of diesel motors manufactured by General Motors, which drove a pair of screw propellers. Her propulsion system was rated to produce 6,000 brake horsepower (4,500 kW) for a top speed of 19.5 knots (36.1 km/h; 22.4 mph). Oil storage amounted to between 131 and 197 long tons (133 and 200 t), which allowed a cruising radius of up to 6,000 nautical miles (11,000 km; 6,900 mi) at an economical pace of 10 knots (19 km/h; 12 mph).

The ship's armament consisted of a main battery of three 3-inch (76 mm) /50-caliber guns in individual pivot mounts, which could be used against air or surface targets. These were supported by a light anti-aircraft battery that initially consisted of four 1.1 in (28 mm) /75-caliber guns in a quadruple mount and nine 20 mm (0.79 in) Oerlikon guns. For attacks against submarines, the ship was equipped with a Hedgehog mortar, eight depth charge throwers, and two depth charge racks.

== Construction and commissioning ==
She was launched on 16 June 1943 by Mare Island Navy Yard; sponsored by Mrs. W. E. Rutherford; and commissioned on 18 September 1943.

== Service history ==
After training in the Hawaiian Islands, Fleming arrived at Tarawa on 15 January 1944 for local patrol and escort duty, as well as escort missions to Makin, Majuro, Funafuti, and Kwajalein through April. She returned to Pearl Harbor for a brief overhaul from 19 May – 7 June, then sailed for Eniwetok where she joined a convoy bound for Guam, arriving on 27 June. Fleming patrolled off Orote, and escorted merchantmen from Guam to Tinian and Eniwetok until 20 August, when she sailed to escort an attack transport to Saipan and Pearl Harbor.

Completing her assignment in the Mariana Islands operation, Fleming acted as target for submarines training in Hawaiian waters until 17 October, when she arrived at Eniwetok to begin 4 months of convoy escort duty between Eniwetok and Ulithi, the great base whose buildup was essential to the Iwo Jima and Okinawa operations.

On the night of 8 January 1945, guarding two tankers en route from Ulithi to Eniwetok, Fleming made a radar contact and began the five Hedgehog and depth charge attacks which sank the Japanese I-362 just after midnight on 14 January.

In late-February and early-March, Fleming made escort voyages from Eniwetok to Saipan and Guam, then on 13 March arrived at Ulithi to prepare for the Okinawa assault. She sortied on 21 March in the screen of escort carriers providing air support for the initial landings on 1 April, and sailed with them until 17 April, when she departed the area to escort Natoma Bay to Guam for repairs. The escort carrier and destroyer escort sailed from Guam on 4 May to return to duty at Okinawa 4 days later.

On 20 May, still screening the escort carriers, Fleming splashed two of three Japanese planes which attempted to kamikaze or bomb her, driving the third away. Five days later, she rescued 11 survivors of LSM-135 and 20 of Bates, both sunk by kamikazes. Fleming continued to serve off Okinawa until 5 July, when she sailed for a west coast overhaul.

Still in the yard when the war ended, she was decommissioned on 10 November 1945, and sold for scrap on 29 January 1948.

== Awards ==
- Combat Action Ribbon (retroactive)
- American Campaign Medal
- Asiatic–Pacific Campaign Medal (with four service stars)
- World War II Victory Medal
