= Flamingo Road =

Flamingo Road may refer to:

- Flamingo Road (Florida), Florida State Road 823 in Broward County, Florida, U.S.
- Flamingo Road (Las Vegas), in Nevada, U.S.
- Flamingo Road (novel), a novel by Robert Wilder
- Flamingo Road (film), a 1949 film by Michael Curtiz based on the novel, starring Joan Crawford
- Flamingo Road (TV series), a 1980–1982 TV series based on the novel
