= HMS Flamingo =

Two ships of the Royal Navy have been named HMS Flamingo, after the bird.

- The first HMS Flamingo (1876) was a composite screw gunvessel launched in 1876, sent to harbour service in 1893, and sold 1923.
- The second HMS Flamingo (L18) was a Black Swan-class sloop. She was laid down by Yarrow Shipbuilders at Scotstoun in Glasgow on 26 May 1938, launched on 18 April 1939, completed on 3 November 1939 and commissioned 3 December 1939. Flamingo was sold to West Germany in January 1959, and renamed Graf Spee.
