= Flemming Hansen =

Flemming Hansen may refer to:

- Flemming Hansen (politician) (1939–2021), Danish politician
- Flemming Hansen (handballer) (1948–2013), Danish Olympic handball player
- Flemming Hansen (handballer, born 1961), Danish international handball player, father of Mikkel Hansen
- Flemming Hansen (cyclist) (born 1944), Danish cyclist
