= Esporte Clube Flamengo Paraibano =

Flamengo Paraibano
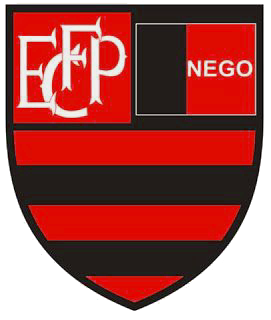
- Full name: Esporte Clube Flamengo Paraibano
- Nickname(s): Urubu Paraibano; Rubro-Negro do Nordeste
- Founded: December 1, 2008
- Ground: Estádio da Graça, João Pessoa, Paraíba state, Brazil
- Capacity: 6,000
Home colors	Away colors

Esporte Clube Flamengo Paraibano, commonly known as Flamengo Paraibano, is a Brazilian football club based in João Pessoa, Paraíba state.

== History ==
The club was founded on December 1, 2008. Flamengo Paraibano finished in the second position in the Campeonato Paraibano Second Level in 2011, only behind of Paraíba, thus gaining promotion to the 2012 Campeonato Paraibano First Level.

== Stadium ==
Esporte Clube Flamengo Paraibano play their home games at Estádio Leonardo Vinagre da Silveira, commonly known as Estádio da Graça. The stadium has a maximum capacity of 6,000 people.
