= USS Flamingo =

USS Flamingo is a name used more than once by the U.S. Navy in naming its ships:

- USS Flamingo (AM-32) laid down 18 October 1917 by the New Jersey Drydock and Transportation Co., Elizabethport, New Jersey.
- USS Flamingo (AMc-22) laid down in 1940 as the fishing dragger Harriet N. Eldridge; Acquired by the U.S. Navy, 4 November 1940.
- USS Flamingo (AMS-11) laid down 11 May 1942 by Stadium Yacht Basin Inc., Cleveland, Ohio.
