= Estádio da Graça =

Football stadium in João Pessoa, Paraíba, Brazil

Estádio Leonardo Vinagre da Silveira
- Estádio da Graça
- Location: João Pessoa, Paraíba, Brazil
- Owner: João Pessoa City Hall
- Capacity: 6,000
- Surface: Grass
- Field size: 100 x 64m

Construction
- Opened: January 9, 1944
- Renovated: 2008-2010

Tenants
- Flamengo Paraibano; Miramar Esporte Clube

Estádio Leonardo Vinagre da Silveira, commonly known as Estádio da Graça, is an association football stadium located in Cruz das Armas neighborhood, João Pessoa, Paraíba, Brazil.

== History ==
The first game at the stadium was played during his inauguration, on January 9, 1944, when Dolaport and Santa Cruz drew 2-2. The first goal of the stadium was scored by Dolaport's Odilon, during the 17th minute of the game.

During the April 14, 2002 Campeonato do Nordeste game between Botafogo-PB and Sport, the stadium reached its highest attendance ever: approximately seven thousand people watched the game.

On July 7, 2008, the stadium's most ambitious reformation started, with the purpose to adequate it to FIFA's and Supporter's Statute's regulations. The stadium area was expanded from 1,419 m^{2} to 2,118 m^{2}. The works were concluded on March 27, 2010, costing approximately R$3,5 million.

== Structure ==
After the reformation, the stadium was upgraded with three sets of covered bleachers, supporting approximately 5,000 seated people, a luxury box, two bars and six bathroom areas. The field was improved with a new type of grass and a new floodlight system. The locker room for athletes and referees was improved. It has six cabins for the news media.
