= Peter Fleming (historian) =

Professor of medieval history

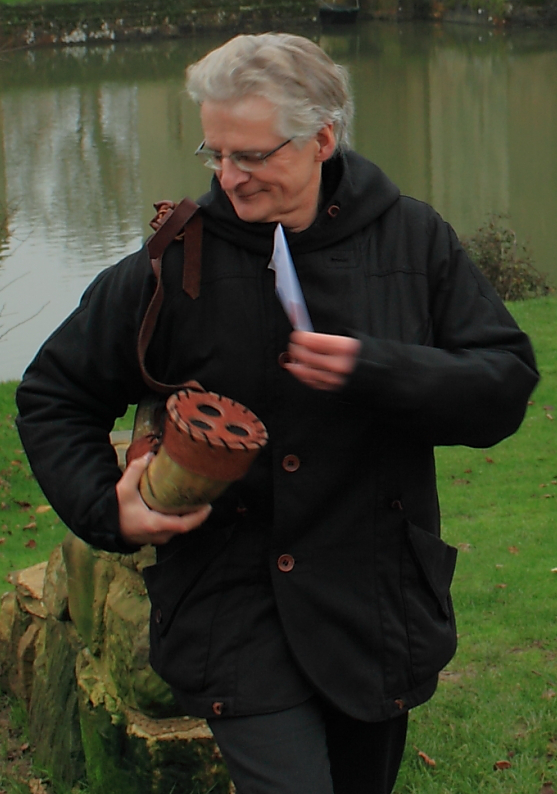
- Fleming playing a medieval Echo Horn, c. 2015
- Born: 28 March 1958
- Died: 21 April 2025 (aged 67); Bristol, England
- Education: Swansea University
- Occupation: History professor
- Employer: University of the West of England
- Known for: Bristol medieval historian
- Spouse: Ann Rippin (died 2023)
- Children: None

Peter Fleming (28 March 1958 – 21 April 2025) was a professor of medieval history at the University of the West of England. He specialised in the history of migration, urban history and the development of Bristol during the Middle Ages.

== Life and career ==
Fleming was born in 1958 to a working class family. He studied at University College Swansea, before being appointed to Bristol Polytechnic (now UWE) in 1987, to develop the History Department's research on teaching on medieval and early modern history. He made his name as a historian of fifteenth century England, with a particular interest in Bristol history.

Fleming died in April 2025 following a prolonged illness. His wife, Ann Rippin, died in 2023. Ill health had limited his scholarship during his last ten years, but his final book, Late Medieval Bristol, was published in 2024.

== Selected works ==
Fleming's books include:

- Fleming, Peter & Kieran Costello (1998). Discovering Cabot's Bristol : Life in the Medieval and Tudor Town. Redcliffe Press
- Regionalism and Revision: The Crown and Its Provinces in England, 1250–1650 (edited with Anthony Gross and J. R. Lander, Hambledon, 1999)
- Family and Household in Medieval England (Palgrave, 2001)
- Gloucestershire's Forgotten Battle: Nibley Green, 1470 (with Michael Wood, Tempus, 2003)
- Bristol: Ethnic Minorities and the City, 1000–2001 (with Madge Dresser, Phillimore, 2007)
- The Maire of Bristowe is Kalendar, editor (Bristol Record Society, Vol. 67, 2015)
- Fleming, Peter (2024). Late Medieval Bristol: Time, Space and Power. Donington: Yorkist History Trust. ISBN 9781915774187.

He is also the author of:

- Fleming, Peter (2001). "Town versus abbey during the 1490s". In Bettey, J. H. (ed.). Historic churches and church life in Bristol : essays in memory of Elizabeth Ralph 1911-2000. Vol. 9. Gloucester: Bristol and Gloucestershire Archaeological Society. pp. 73–84. ISBN 0900197536.
- Fleming, Peter (2007). "Identity and Belonging: Irish and Welsh in Fifteenth-Century Bristol". In Clark, Linda (ed.). Conflicts, Consequences and the Crown in the Late Middle Ages. The Fifteenth Century. Vol. 7. Woodbridge: Boydell. pp. 175–93. ISBN 9781843833338.
- Fleming, Peter (2012). 'Processing Power: Performance, Politics and Place in Early Tudor Bristol' in A. Compton Reeves (ed.), Personalities and Perspectives of Fifteenth-Century England (ACMRS, Tempe, Arizona)
- Fleming, Peter (2018). "The Severn Sea: Urban Networks and Connections in the Fifteenth Century". In Jones, Evan T.; Stone, Richard (eds.). The World of the Newport Medieval Ship: Trade, Politics and Shipping in the Mid-Fifteenth Century. University of Wales Press. pp. 115–133. ISBN 9781786831439.
