= Peter Flemming (artist) =

Canadian artist

Peter Flemming (born 1973 in Burlington, Ontario) is a Canadian artist known for his site-variable kinetic and sound installation works using electronic, mechanical and robotic technologies. Flemming holds an AOCA diploma from the Ontario College of Art in 1997 and a Master of Fine Arts degree from the Nova Scotia College of Art and Design in 2001. In 2004, Maclean's magazine listed Flemming as one of ten up-and-coming artists to watch in Canada. Flemming has exhibited his work across Canada and internationally. Flemming currently teaches electronics in the Intermedia Program at Concordia University in Montréal, Québec, and previously taught at the Alberta College of Art and Design in Calgary, Alberta and the Nova Scotia College of Art and Design in Halifax, Nova Scotia.
