= Flemish =

Flemish may refer to:

- Flemish, adjective for Flanders, Belgium
- Flemish region, one of the three regions of Belgium
- Flemish Community, one of the three constitutionally defined language communities of Belgium
- Flemish dialects, a Dutch dialect cluster spoken in Flanders
- Flemish people or Flemings, inhabitants of Flanders

== See also ==
- Flanders (disambiguation)
- Fleming (disambiguation)
