= Itaporanga, Paraíba =

Itaporanga
- Municipality
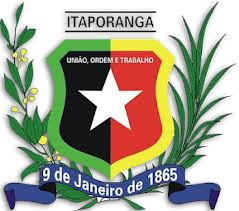
- Flag Coat of arms

- Location in Paraíba state

- Location in Brazil
- Coordinates: 7°18′14″S 38°9′0″W
- Country: Brazil
- Region: Northeast
- State: Paraíba
- Mesoregion: Sertão Paraibano
- Microregion: Itaporanga

Area
  - Total: 468.06 km^{2} (180.72 sq mi)

Population (2020)
  - Total: 24,828
  - Density: 53.044/km^{2} (137.38/sq mi)
- Time zone: UTC−3 (BRT)

Itaporanga is a municipality in the state of Paraíba in the Northeast Region of Brazil. The population is 24,828 (2020 est.) in an area of 468.06 km².

== See also ==
- List of municipalities in Paraíba
