= João Pessoa, Paraíba =

Capital city of Paraíba, Brazil

João Pessoa
- Municipality
- Municipality of João Pessoa
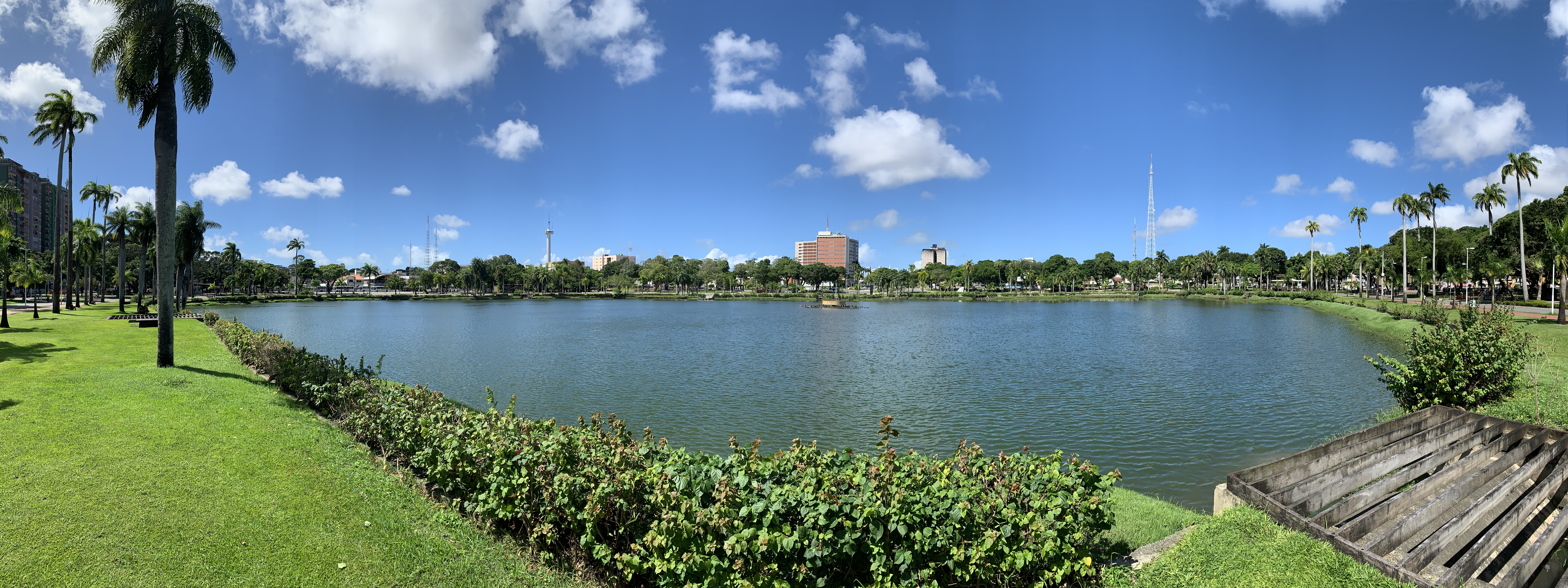
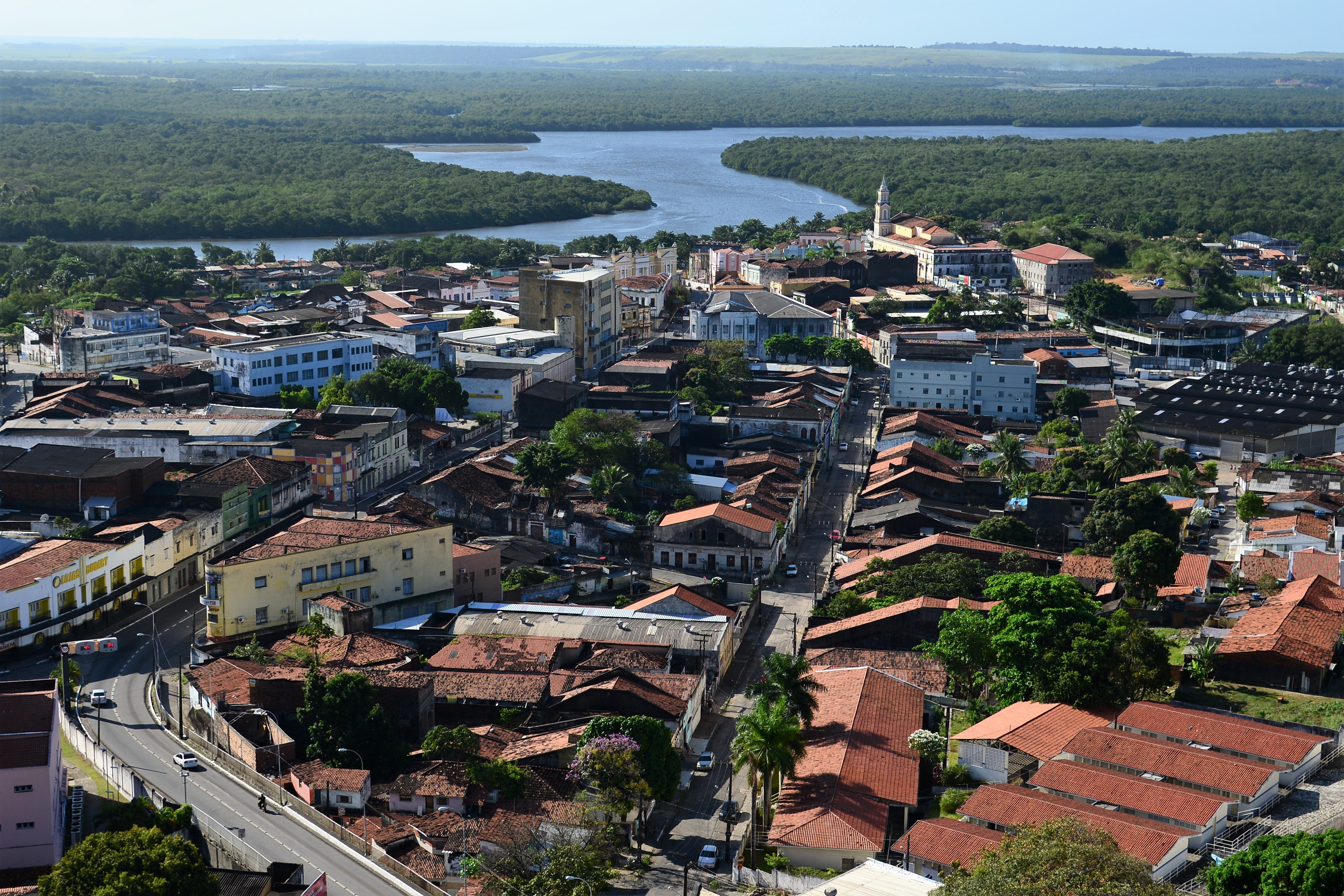
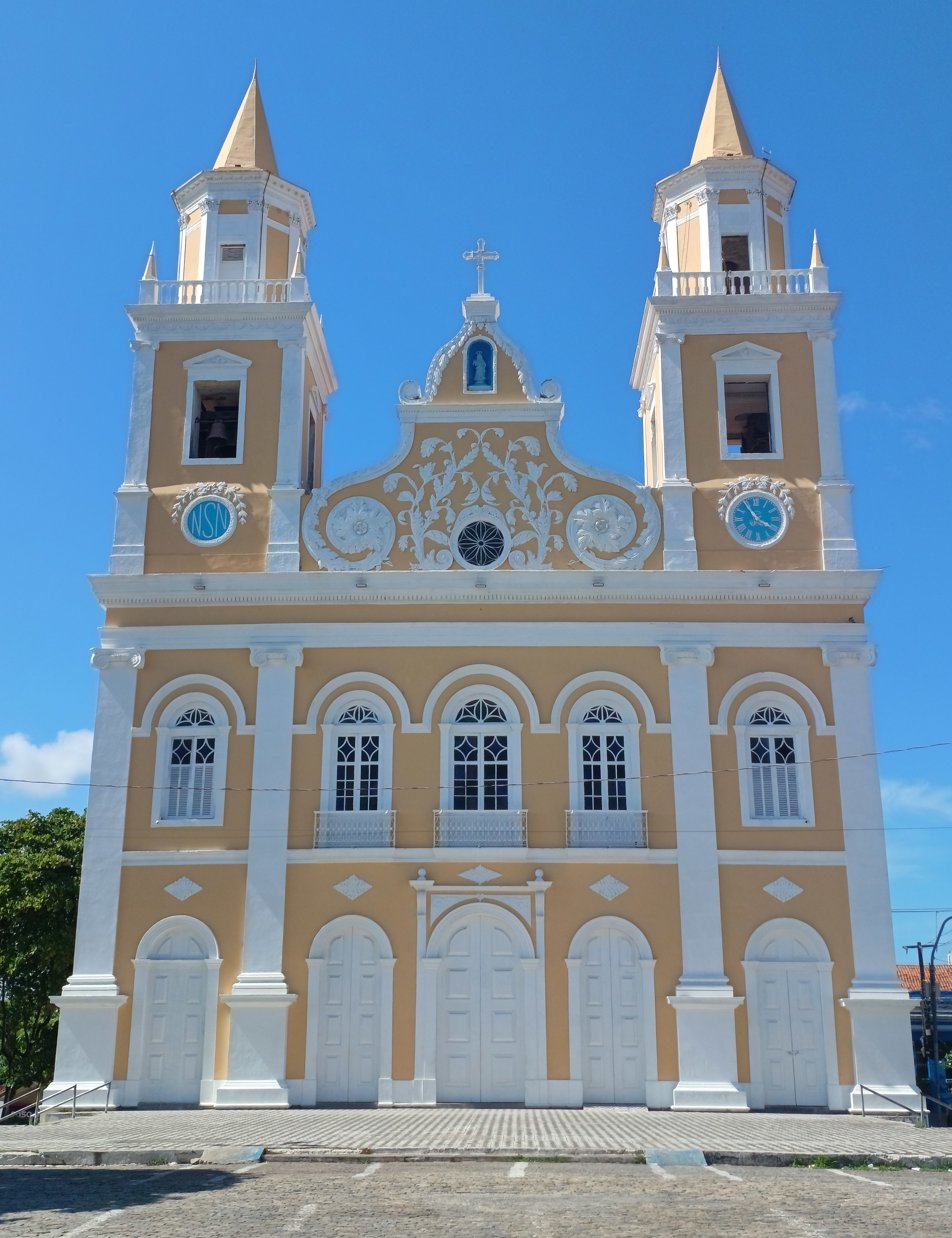
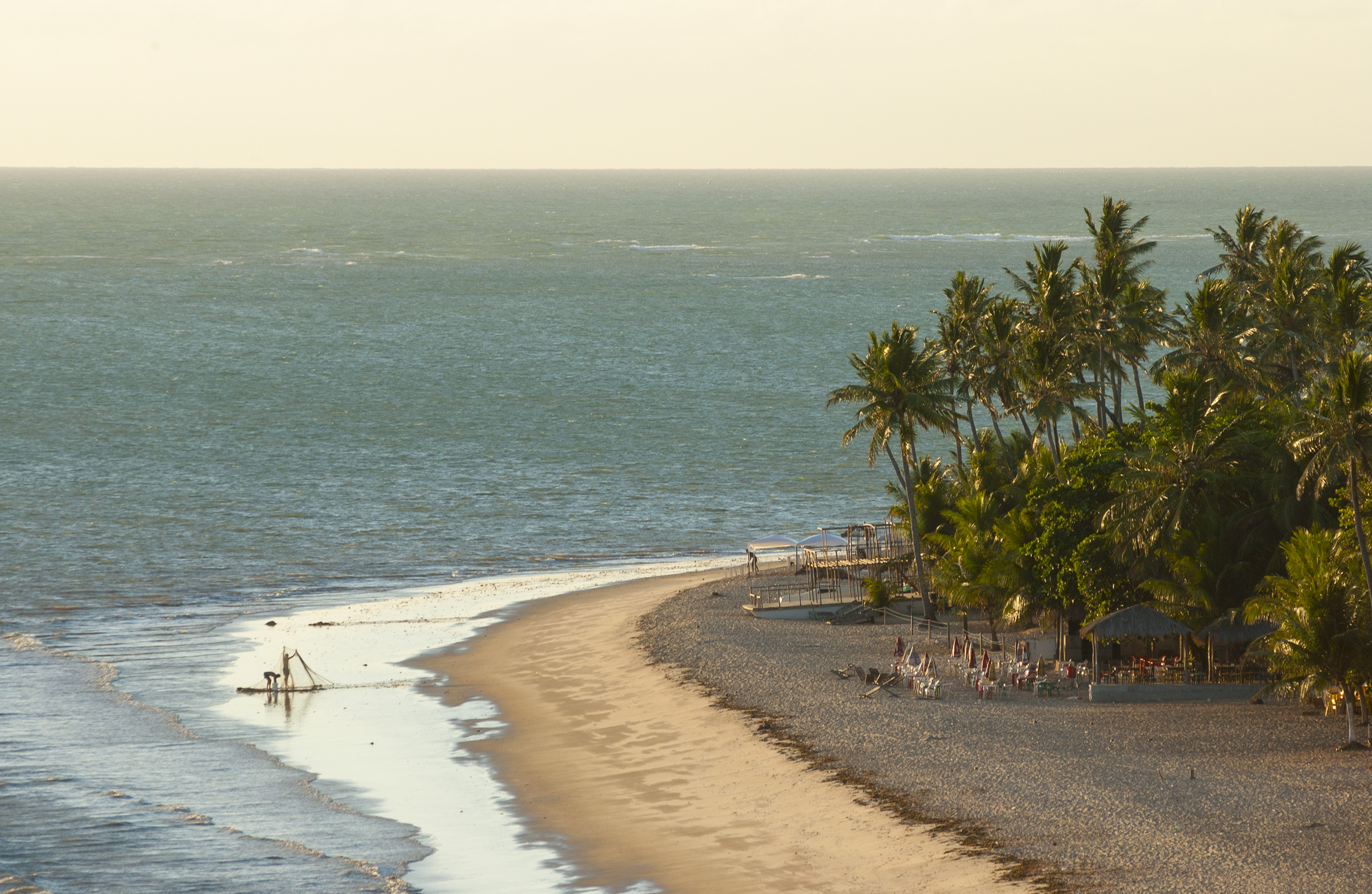
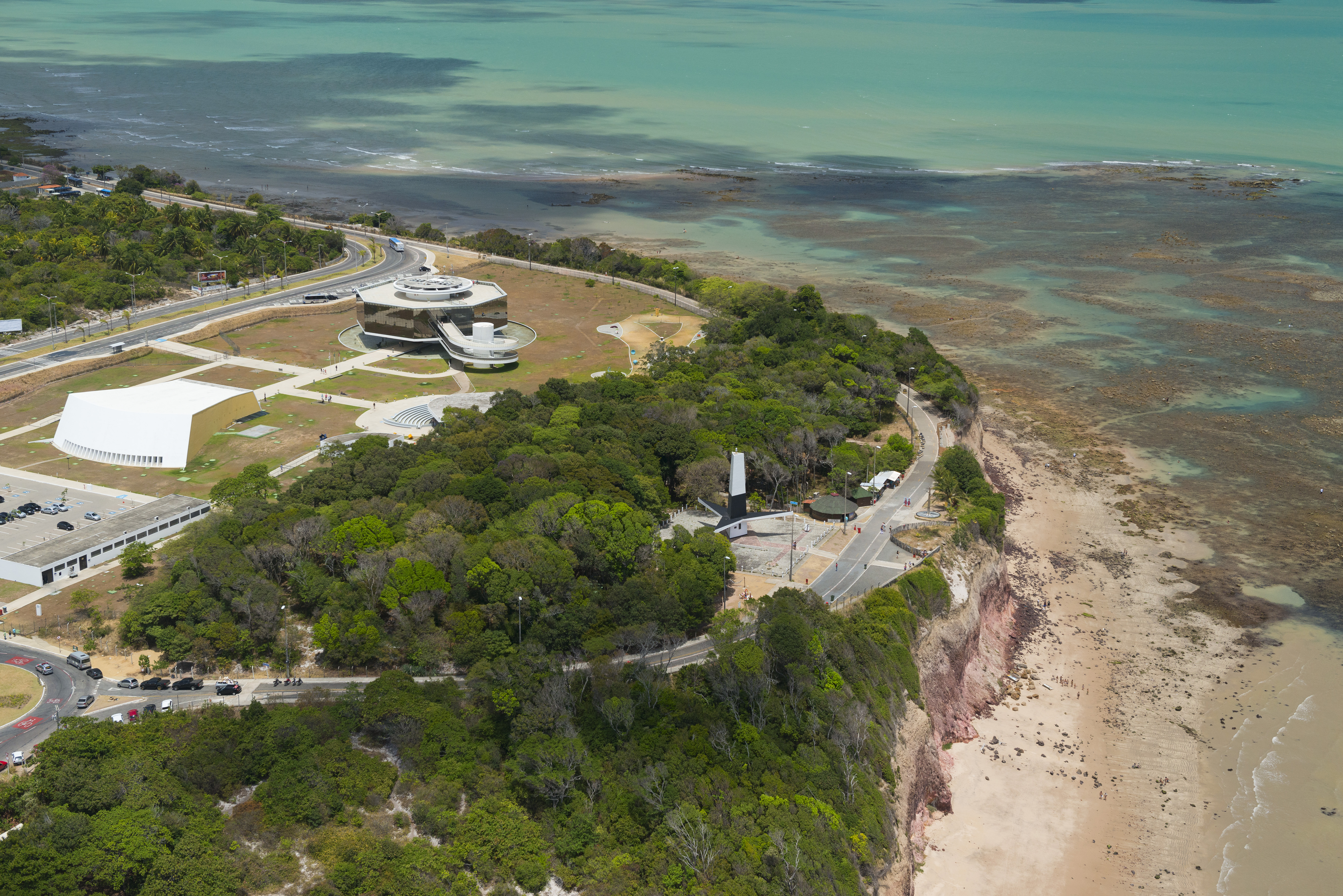
- Solon de Lucena Lagoon Park Historic Center of João Pessoa near the Sanhauá River Cathedral Basilica of Our Lady of the Snows Ponta do Seixas, easternmost point of the Americas Cabo Branco Station and Cabo Branco Lighthouse Skyline of the city

- Flag Coat of arms
- Nicknames: Sun Gate; Green City; California of Brazil; Brazilian city of handicrafts
- Motto: INTREPIDA AB ORIGINE (Latin); Fearless from the beginning
- Location of João Pessoa in the state of Paraíba

- Location of João Pessoa in Brazil
- Coordinates: 07°07′12″S 34°52′48″W
- Country: Brazil
- Region: Northeast
- State: Paraíba
- Founded: August 5, 1585

Government
  - Mayor: Léo Bezerra (PSB)

Area
  - Municipality: 211.475 km^{2} (81.651 sq mi)
- Elevation: 40 m (130 ft)

Population (2025)
  - Municipality: 897,633
  - Rank: 20th in Brazil; 18th (Agglomeration); 24th (Metro)
  - Density: 4,244.63/km^{2} (10,993.5/sq mi)
  - Urban: 1,256,176
  - Metro: 1,393,026
- Demonym: pessoense (Portuguese)
- Time zone: UTC−3 (UTC−3)
- Postal code: 58000-001 to 58099-999
- Area code: +55 83
- HDI (2010): 0.763 – high
- Website: www.joaopessoa.pb.gov.br

João Pessoa (/ˈʒwaʊn pəˈsoʊə/ ZHWOWN pə-SOH-ə; Portuguese: [ʒuˈɐ̃w peˈsoɐ]) is a port city in northeastern Brazil. It is the largest city and capital of the state of Paraíba, with an estimated population of 888,679 (as of 2024). It is located on the right bank of the Paraíba do Norte river.

The new "Estação Ciência, Cultura e Artes" (Science, Culture and Art Station), located at the most eastern point of the Americas (Ponta do Seixas), is an educational and cultural institution as well as a national landmark. The complex, inaugurated in 2008, was created by Brazilian architect Oscar Niemeyer and is one of his final projects.

The capital of Paraíba received the title of Creative City by UNESCO in 2017, appointing João Pessoa as "Brazilian city of handicrafts".

== History ==
=== Background, foundation, and early years ===
In 1534, King John III of Portugal divided the colony into hereditary captaincies, with Paraíba being subordinated to the Captaincy of Itamaracá, extending from the Guaju River to the Goiana River. The Captaincy of Paraíba was created only in 1574, after the attack on Tracunhaém, a sugar mill in the Captaincy of Itamaracá. However, the new captaincy would only be effectively occupied eleven years later, after five expeditions attempted to conquer it, the first four of which ended in failure.

To repel invaders, on May 1, 1584, the Fort of São Filipe was built on the left bank of the Paraíba River, on land that today belongs to the district of Forte Velho, in Santa Rita, an area inhabited by the Potiguara Indigenous people. The fort, however, suffered constant attacks from French corsairs and the Potiguaras and was abandoned less than a year later, being set on fire in June 1585. Earlier that same year, in February, the Tabajara Indigenous people, led by Piragibe, arrived in Paraíba and settled on the left bank of the river. Initially allies, the Tabajaras soon became rivals of the Potiguaras and entered into conflict both with them and with the Portuguese colonizers.

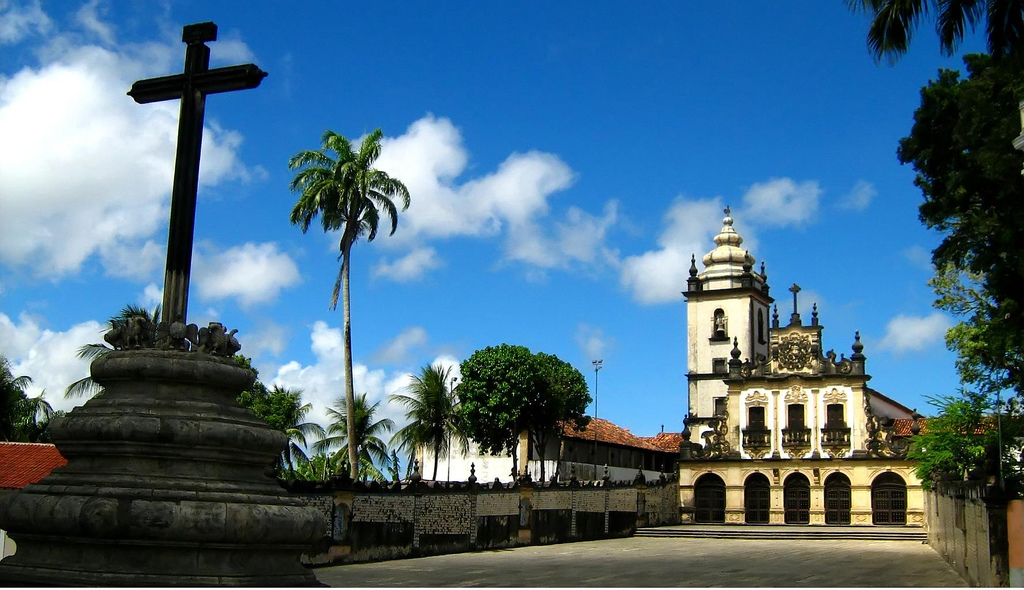
The São Francisco Cultural Center, which houses the Convent and Church of Santo Antônio, as well as the House of Prayer and cloister of the Third Order of Saint Francis

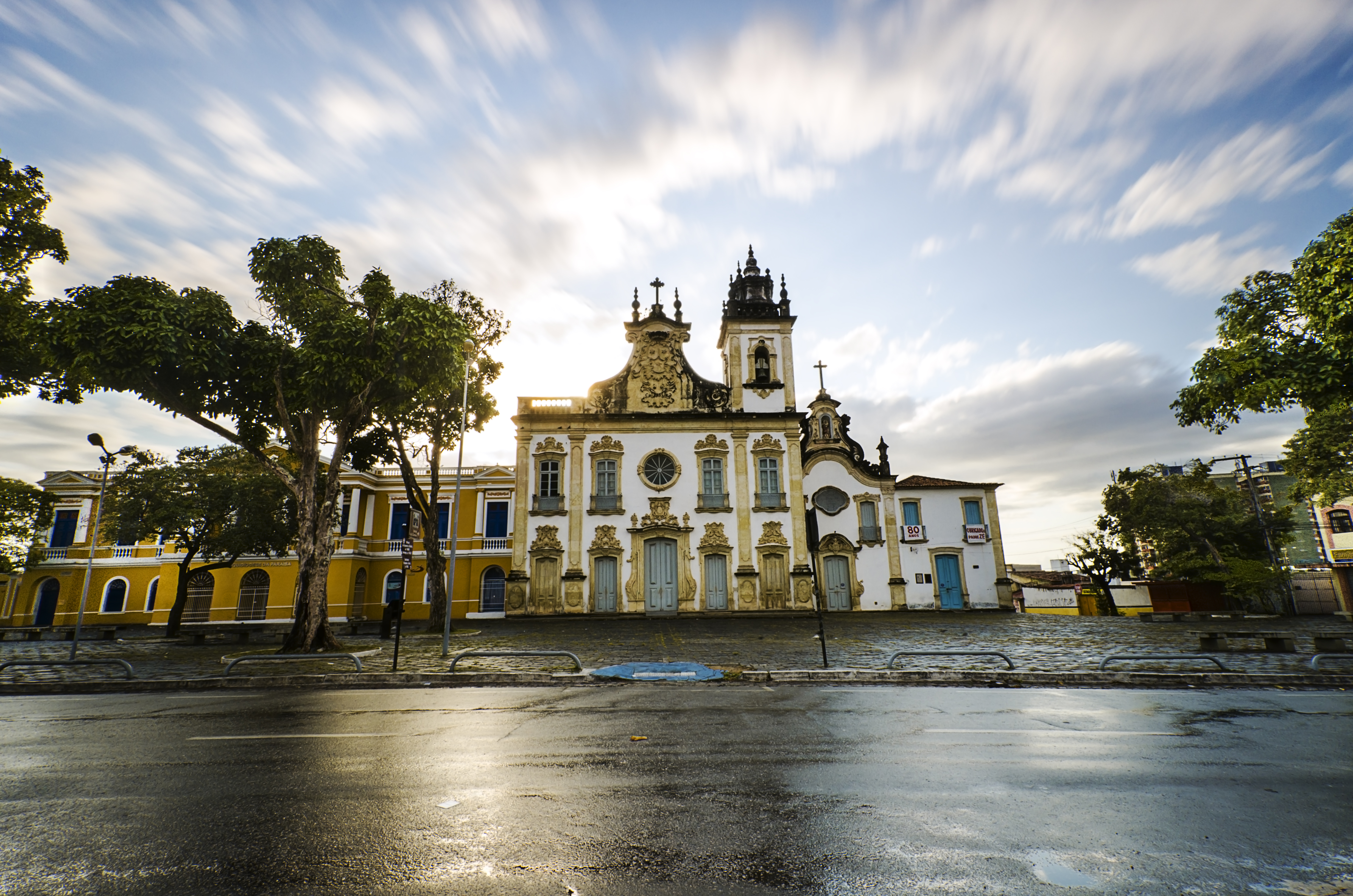
The Convent and Church of Our Lady of Mount Carmel and, to the left, the episcopal palace, where the archdiocesan curia operates.

A peace agreement between the Portuguese and the Tabajaras, represented by Piragibe, was sealed on August 5, 1585, thereby consolidating the conquest of Paraíba. This accord allowed the beginning of settlement in the region starting on October 31, 1585, in an area at the mouth of the Sanhauá River, named Porto do Capim, located in the lower part of what is now the Varadouro neighborhood. On November 4 of the same year, construction began on the city's fortress. Some historians consider this date to be the true foundation of Cidade Real de Nossa Senhora das Neves — rather than August 5. This fort, often confused with the Varadouro Fort (built only in the 1630s), lasted only a few years and by the late 1600s was already in ruins.

Between 1585 and 1586, on top of a hill, a chapel dedicated to Our Lady of the Snows (Nossa Senhora das Neves) began to be built. It quickly became the parish church, whose first vicar was Father João Vas Sallem, appointed on October 30, 1586. To connect this hill (Cidade Alta, or Upper City) to the mouth of the Sanhauá River (Cidade Baixa, or Lower City), a road was opened, identified by some historians as the Ladeira de São Francisco and by others as the Ladeira da Borborema. In 1588, the city was renamed Filipeia de Nossa Senhora das Neves in honor of King Philip II of Spain (Philip I of Portugal), who at the time ruled both Portugal and Spain under the Iberian Union (1580–1640). In 1599, after a peace agreement with the Potiguaras, Filipeia de Nossa Senhora das Neves became known as Parahyba.

The early years following the city's foundation were also marked by the arrival of religious orders, including the Franciscans, Carmelites, and Benedictines. In 1589, Friar Melchior de Santa Catarina, custodian of the Franciscans, arrived in the city to establish a mission. The colonial government offered land for the construction of a convent, which the friar approved. The project was designed by Friar Francisco dos Santos, and construction began in 1590, though it was later halted at an uncertain date between 1592 and 1596. The work resumed only in 1602 and was completed in 1608.

It is believed that the Carmelites arrived around 1591, although they began building their convent only after 1600. In 1595, Friar Damião da Fonseca, representing the Benedictines, arrived in Filipeia and requested from the captaincy's governor, Feliciano Coelho de Carvalho, a plot of land for the construction of a monastery, which also began around 1600. The land for the monastery, located a few meters from the parish church, belonged to Vicar Sallem.

=== From the Dutch Occupation to the 18th Century ===
The first Dutch attempt to conquer the Captaincy of Paraíba occurred between December 5 and 10, 1631, but ended in failure. To prevent new invasions and ensure the captaincy's security, two forts were built: Santo Antônio and Restinga. A new attempt followed in February 1634, again without success. Only on the third attempt, on December 24, 1634, did the Dutch manage to enter the city without resistance, prompting the local population to flee to rural areas and abandon the settlement, which was renamed Frederica — Frederikstad in Dutch – in honor of Frederick Henry, Prince of Orange.

At the time, the city had about 1,500 inhabitants and nineteen sugar mills, most of which were seized by the invaders. The Franciscans were expelled from their convent, which was converted into a fortress (1636). The Portuguese only recognized Dutch rule in 1637, acknowledging the colony of New Holland, which extended from the São Francisco River to present-day Ceará.

Elias Herckmans, who governed the captaincy between 1636 and 1639, described the city as follows:

It is surrounded by forest and cannot be seen by those approaching, except when one is already within it, unless one sails up or down the river; for when arriving at the mouth or entrance of the bay called Varadouro, one can perfectly see the convent of St. Francis and some buildings on the northern side.

New Holland at its greatest extent

In 1645, the Pernambuco Insurrection broke out – a revolt against Dutch domination in Brazil. Among its leaders was André Vidal de Negreiros, born in the captaincy at the Engenho São João (current São João do Cariri), who took part in all stages of the movement, including both Battles of Guararapes in 1648 and 1649. The First Anglo-Dutch War (1652–1655) weakened Dutch power in the Northeast, leading the invaders to sign their surrender on January 26, 1654, leaving the captaincy in ruins. However, it was only in 1661 that the Netherlands officially recognized Portuguese sovereignty over northeastern Brazil through the Treaty of The Hague. With the end of the occupation, Frederica reverted to the name Parahyba do Norte. In 1671, the Church of Our Lady of the Snows had most of its structure demolished, except for the nave. The rebuilding of the temple, interrupted several times, lasted over a century and was completed only in the late 18th century.

In August 1704, the captain-major of Paraíba, Fernando de Barros e Vasconcelos, ordered the construction of the Powder House (Casa de Pólvora) on the Ladeira de São Francisco, which lasted until 1710. On September 24, 1729, the cornerstone of the Church of Our Lady of Mercy (Igreja de Nossa Senhora das Mercês) was laid, and it was consecrated on September 21, 1741. In 1763, the Portuguese sailor Sílvio Siqueira, while navigating off the coast of Paraíba, faced a violent storm at sea. Gathering his crew, he prayed to Our Lady of Penha, to whom he was devoted, asking for the tempest to subside. Moments later, the storm weakened, and the crew disembarked at what is now Penha Beach, where a shrine dedicated to the Virgin was built. Around the same decade, circa 1767, the Church of Our Lady Mother of Men (Nossa Senhora Mãe dos Homens) was founded.

Still in the 18th century, the city entered a period of decline, leading to the extinction of the Captaincy of Paraíba in 1756, when it was annexed to the Captaincy of Pernambuco. Paraíba would only regain its status as a separate political unit in January 1799, when its autonomy was restored.

=== 19th Century ===
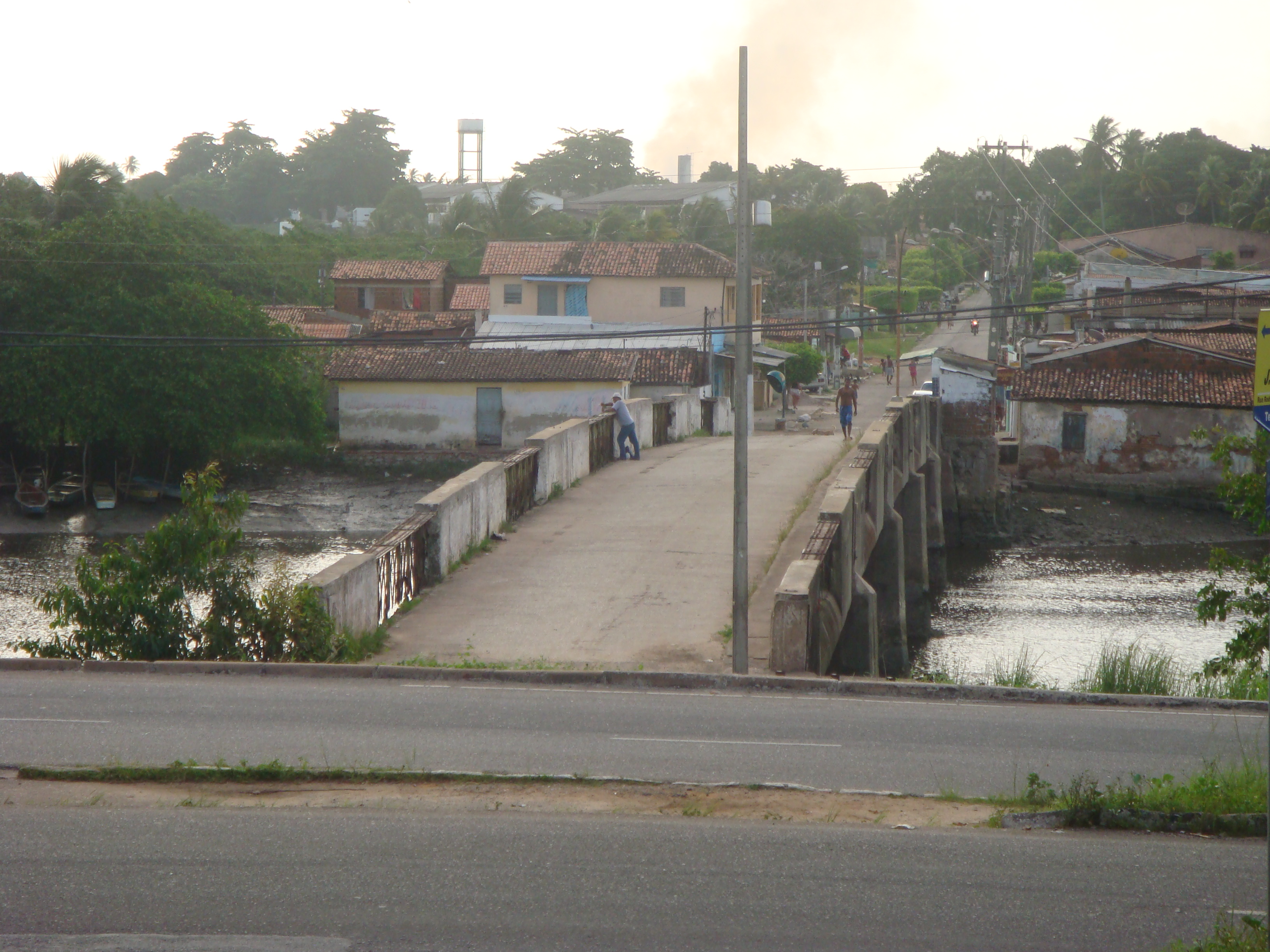
Baralho Bridge over the Sanhauá River, the first connection between the City of Parahyba and the village of Barreiras (now the neighborhoods of Baralho and São Bento, in Bayeux)

On September 7, 1822, Brazil became politically independent from Portugal, and Paraíba became a province of the Empire of Brazil, with the City of Parahyba as its capital. At that time, the city had about three thousand inhabitants. In the same year, the city received its first public lighting system, consisting of twenty oil lamps fueled by castor oil. By 1828, the capital already had 5,816 residents and 2,119 houses, most made of thatch or mud walls. The following year, public lighting was reinforced, and the City of Parahyba had fifty lamps in operation. On March 24, 1836, on the upper floor of the Provincial Assembly, the Lyceu Paraibano was founded, with its first statute approved on April 19, 1837.

Around 1840, the Sanhauá Bridge, also known as Baralho Bridge, was built over the Sanhauá River. It was the first connection between the City of Parahyba and the village of Barreiras – the areas that later became the neighborhoods of Baralho and São Bento, giving rise to the present-day city of Bayeux, which at that time belonged to Santa Rita. In 1847, by imperial decree, the Captaincy of the Ports was created, responsible for the administration of Porto do Capim. On January 24, 1855, the city gained its first cemetery. By 1856, due to its low efficiency, the city's public lighting system was discontinued, except during festivities and in public or commercial establishments. It was only resumed in 1885, this time using kerosene lamps.

On November 4, 1858, Provincial Law No. 13 was enacted, creating the Colégio Nossa Senhora das Neves, which was inaugurated on February 5, 1859. However, the school closed less than two years later and remained inactive until March 1895. In 1859, the city of Paraíba received a visit from Emperor Pedro II of Brazil and his wife Teresa Cristina, on which occasion it received the title of "Imperial City". When Brazil's first national census was conducted in 1872, the city's population was recorded at 24,714 inhabitants, making it the fourth most populous locality in the Province of Paraíba – after Sousa (29,726), Independencia (now Guarabira, with 28,191), and Areia (25,549).

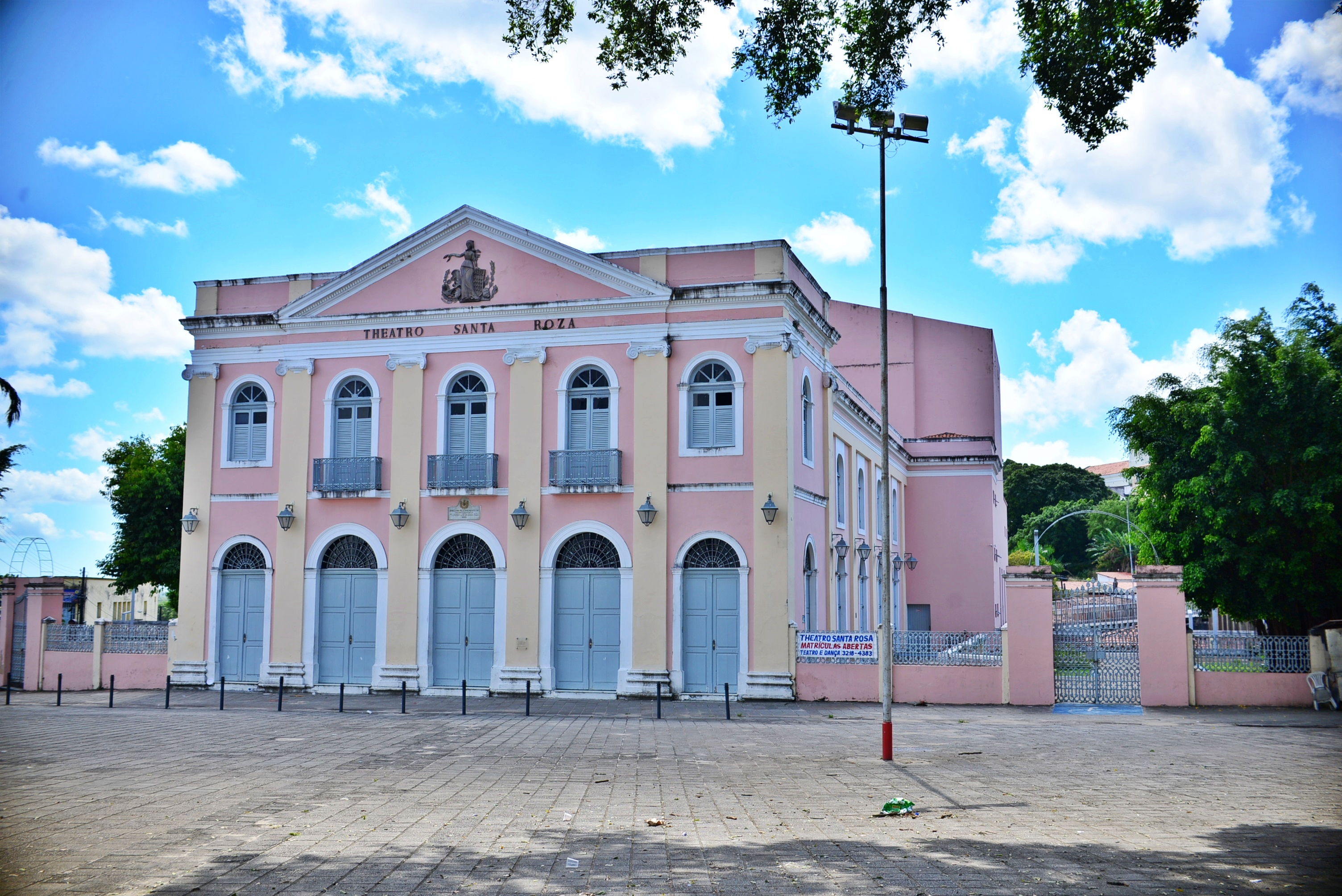
Santa Roza Theater, the most important in Paraíba and the second oldest in the state

The Santa Roza Theater, the most important theater in Paraíba and the second oldest in the state, was inaugurated on November 3, 1889. Named after the provincial president Francisco da Gama Rosa, it became a landmark of local culture. Just twelve days later, the Republic was proclaimed, transforming Paraíba from a province into a state, while the city remained its capital. Venâncio Neiva became the first state president and renamed the building Teatro do Estado (State Theatre).

On April 27, 1892, the Church of Nossa Senhora das Neves became a cathedral, following the creation of the Diocese of Paraíba through the papal bull Ad Universas Orbis Ecclesias by Pope Leo XIII. The new diocese, separated from the Diocese of Olinda (Pernambuco), covered the entire territories of Paraíba and Rio Grande do Norte. It was formally established on March 4, 1894, with the installation of its first bishop, Dom Adauto Aurélio de Miranda Henriques, who also founded the Diocesan Seminary of Paraíba Imaculada Conceição and the Diocesan College (today the Marist College Pio X). Dom Adauto was also responsible for reopening Our Lady of the Snows School (Colégio Nossa Senhora das Neves) on March 14, 1895, after more than thirty years of closure.

Starting March 2, 1895, a state law abolished the municipal council and replaced it with a mayoral system, under which the mayor was appointed by the Paraíba state governor. The first person to hold the position was Jovino Limeira Dinoá, a former provincial deputy, who served until October 1900. In 1896, the city received its first animal-drawn trams, operated by Ferro Carril Parahyba.

=== Early decades of the 20th Century ===
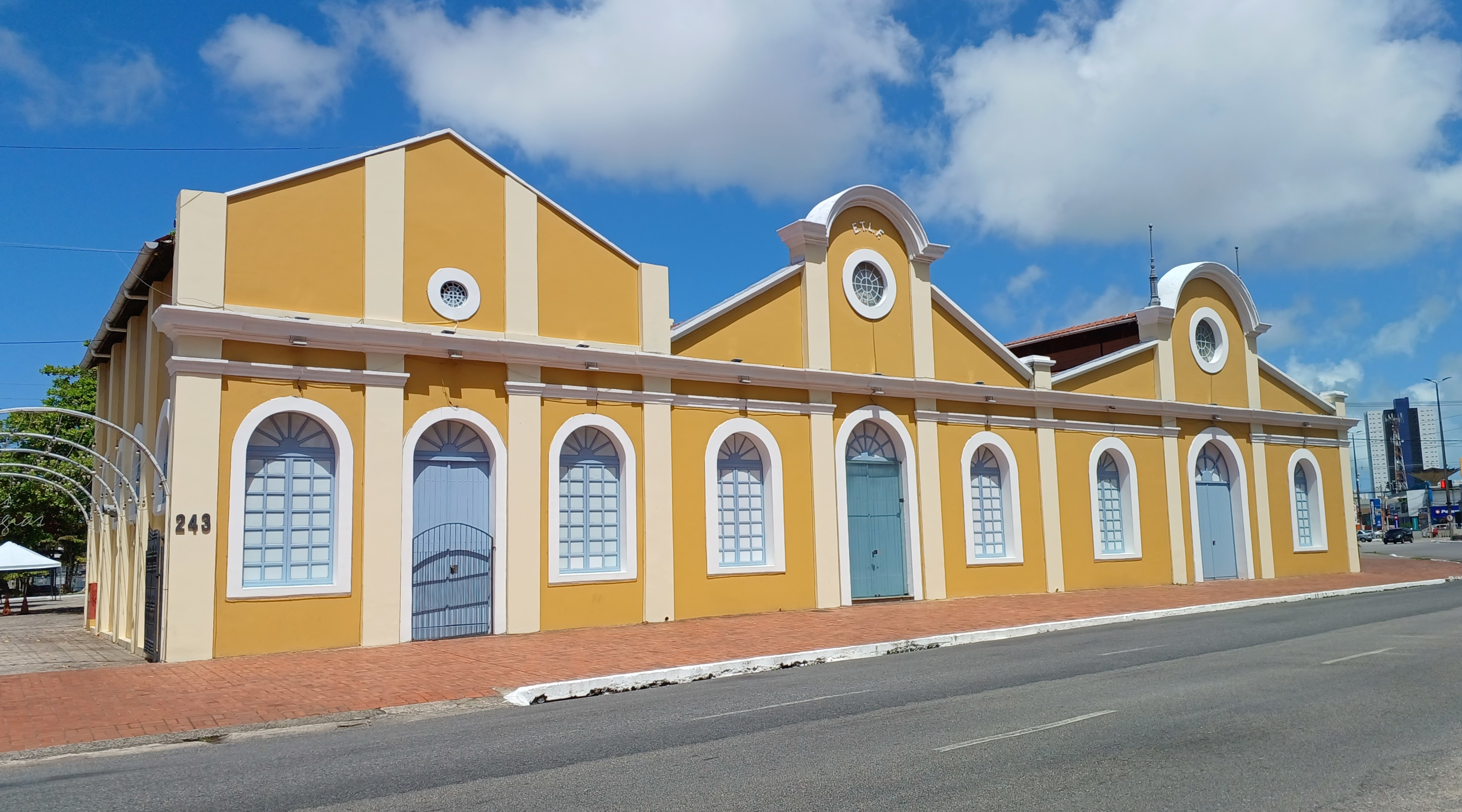
Old headquarters of Usina Cruz do Peixe, the first electricity supplier in the city, now home to Energisa Cultural Usine (inaugurated in 2003)

According to the 1900 census, the municipality had 28,793 inhabitants, a population increase of more than 50% compared to 1890 (18,645). However, Guarabira remained the most populous municipality in the state, with 40,052 inhabitants, followed by Campina Grande (38,303). At that time, the urban area of Parahyba City was limited to the region between the Sanhauá River and Irerês Lagoon. In 1906, during the administration of state president Valfredo Leal, construction began on the Tambaú Railway, the first connection between the city center and the coast. It was completed in 1911 under his successor, João Lopes Machado.

In March 1912, the Usina Cruz do Peixe began operating under the Empresa de Tração, Força e Luz, supplying electric power to the city and replacing acetylene gas and kerosene lighting. The following month, the water supply system began operating, fed by artesian wells in the Buraquinho Forest (Mata do Buraquinho). The project had been planned since 1907, when the government purchased the land for five thousand cruzeiros. However, both the electricity and water systems were limited to wealthier social classes. In 1913, the sanitary engineer Saturnino de Brito, invited by Governor João Pereira de Castro Pinto, prepared a sewage system project for the city, which would only begin construction in 1922.

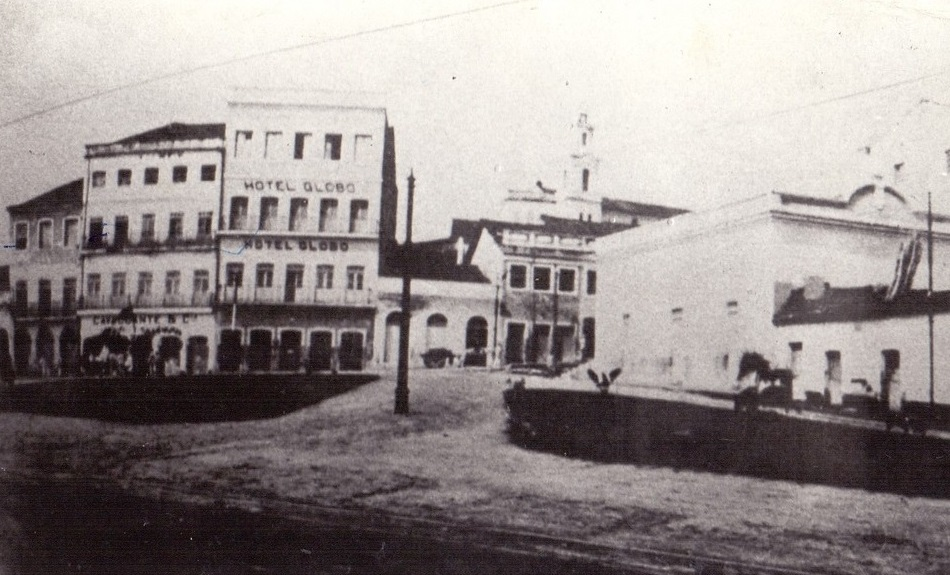
The first building where the Hotel Globo operated, in the 1910s, during its early years

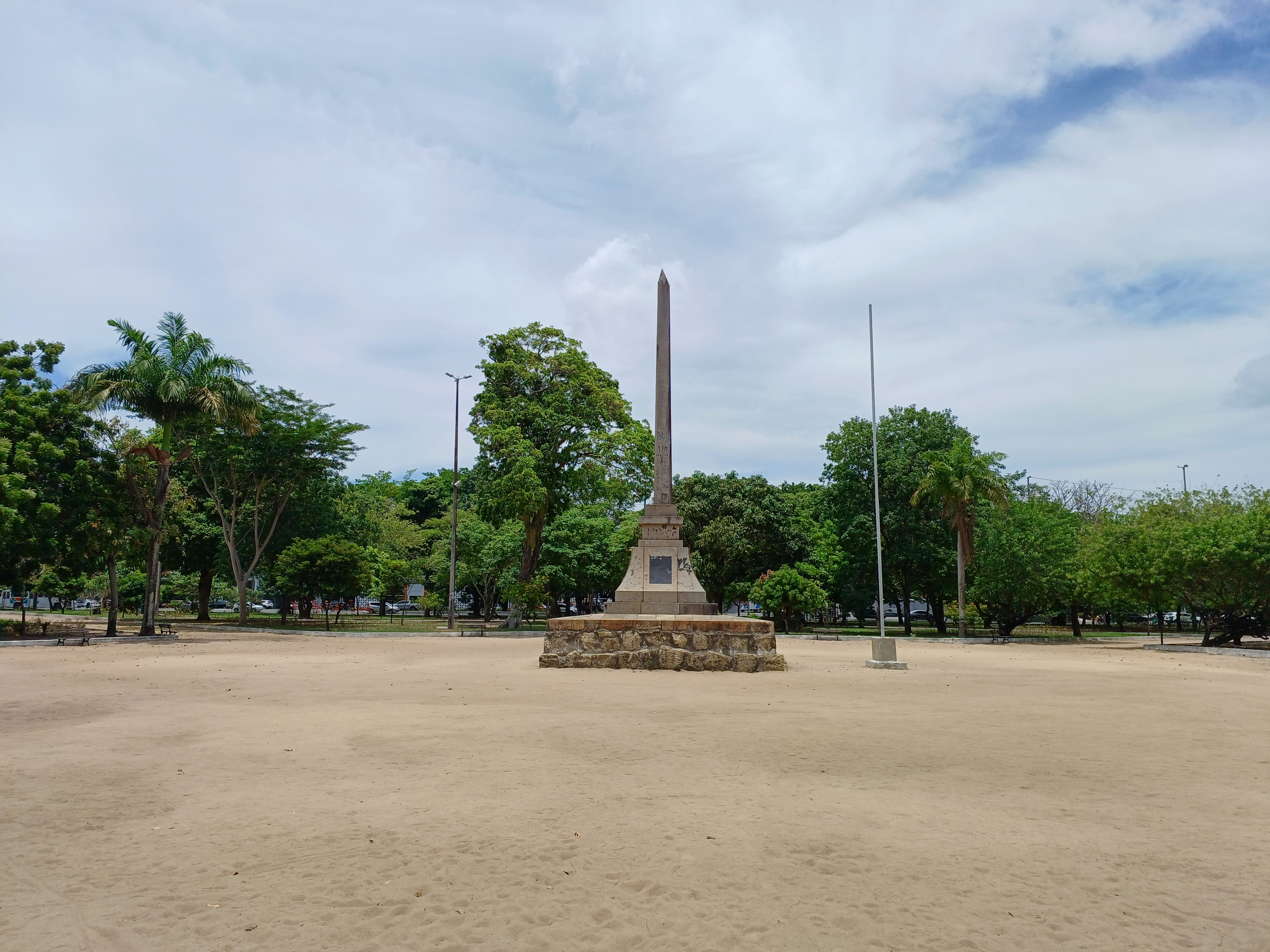
Independence Square, inaugurated on September 7, 1922, in commemoration of the centenary of Brazil's independence

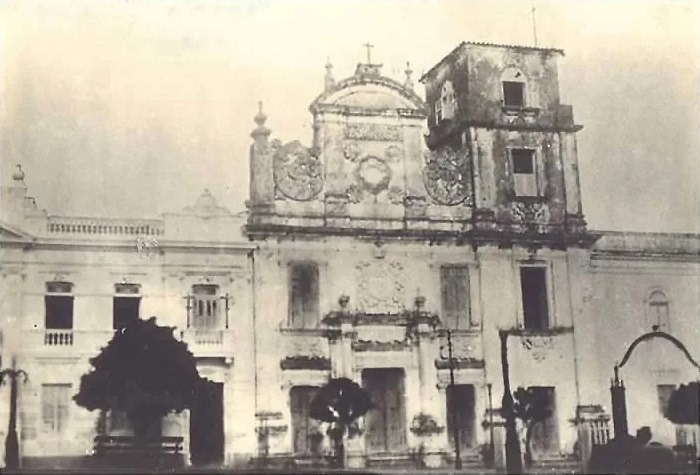
The Church of Our Lady of the Conception of the Military in the 1920s, before its demolition in 1929

On February 6, 1914, through the papal bull Maius Catholicae Religionis Incrementum, Pope Pius X elevated the Diocese of Paraíba to the status of an archdiocese, making Dom Adauto its first archbishop, a position he held until his death in 1935. On February 17 of the same year, electric trams replaced the animal-drawn ones. Between 1915 and 1916, the city saw the inauguration of its first hotels – Globo Hotel (1915) and Luso-Brasileiro Hotel (1916). Around 1918, under Camilo de Holanda, then state president (1916–1920), construction began on a road connecting the city center to the Tambaú beach, which at that time was only a small fishing village. This road would later become Presidente Epitácio Pessoa Avenue, although it was not completed at that time.

In 1920, when the capital's population reached 52,990 inhabitants, Walfredo Guedes Pereira assumed the city's leadership. His administration built the Independence Square, inaugurated on September 7, 1922, to commemorate Brazil's first centenary of independence; established the Arruda Câmara Park (inaugurated on December 24, 1922); and carried out drainage and sanitation around Irerês Lagoon. This lake was renamed Sólon de Lucena Park (Parque Sólon de Lucena) by municipal decree on September 27, 1924, in honor of Sólon Barbosa de Lucena, then state president. His government also oversaw the demolition of two historic churches, Mãe dos Homens and Rosário dos Pretos, both in 1923 – the former to extend what is now Monsenhor Walfredo Leal Avenue, and the latter to build Vidal de Negreiros Square, later known as Ponto de Cem Réis, named after the tram fare charged there.

In 1926, the city's sewage system finally entered into operation, and imperial palm trees were planted around Parque Sólon de Lucena. In August 1929, Globo Hotel moved to its new location on Saint Friar Pedro Gonçalves Square, occupying the residence of its owner, Henriques Siqueira (known as "Seu Marinheiro"). That same year, under the order of Governor João Pessoa Cavalcanti de Albuquerque, the centuries-old Church of Nossa Senhora da Conceição dos Militares (formerly the Chapel of São Gonçalo) beside the Redemption Palace was demolished, except for its tower.

=== Name change until the 1950s ===
On July 26, 1930, João Pessoa was assassinated at Glória Confectionery, on Rua Nova (New Street), in Recife, by his political opponent and personal enemy João Duarte Dantas. The event caused great national repercussion and became one of the triggers of the 1930 Revolution, which was led by Paraíba, Minas Gerais, and Rio Grande do Sul. His body was embalmed in Recife and transported by rail to the Paraíba capital, arriving on July 27, then taken to the Cathedral of Our Lady of the Snows, where it was laid in state until August 1. On that date, it was transported to the port of Cabedelo to be buried in Rio de Janeiro city, which occurred on August 7.

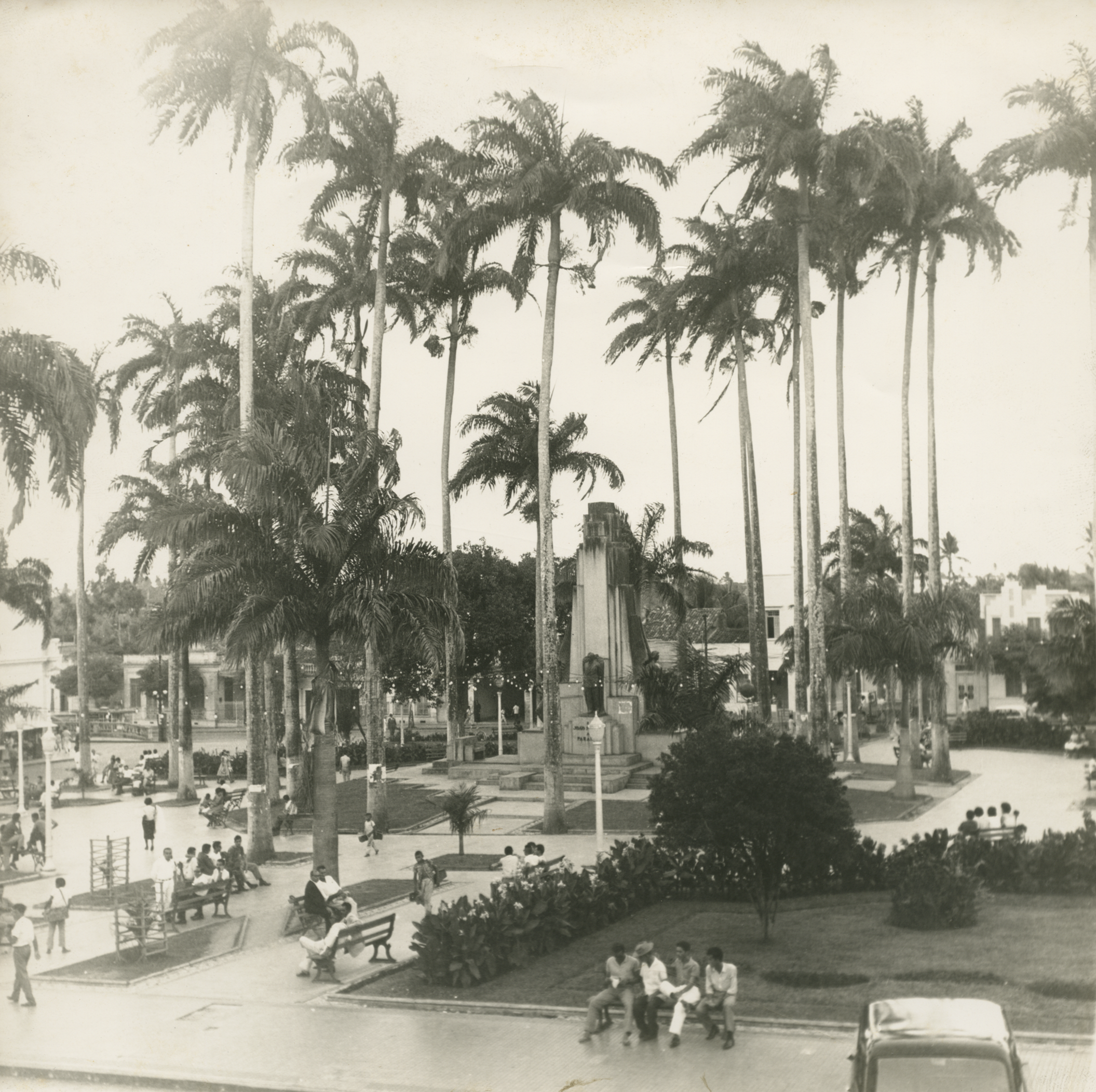
Old photograph of President João Pessoa Square, with the monument "The Altar of the Fatherland" (O Altar da Pátria) in the middle (Brazilian National Archives)

On September 1, 1930, during an ordinary session of the Legislative Assembly of Paraíba at the Santa Roza Theatre, a bill was introduced to change the capital's name from Parahyba do Norte to João Pessoa. The bill, voted on and approved in two rounds, was sanctioned on September 4 by the state president Álvaro Pereira de Carvalho, becoming State Law No. 700. In further tribute to João Pessoa, Comendador Felizardo Square was renamed President João Pessoa Square, and at its center, "The Altar of the Fatherland" (O Altar da Pátria), monument was built and inaugurated on September 8, 1933, with the presence of President Getúlio Vargas.

In 1932, at the invitation of Antenor Navarro, the federal intervener in Paraíba, the architect Nestor de Figueiredo prepared the city's urban plan, called the "Remodeling and Expansion Plan of the City of João Pessoa". His successor, Gratuliano da Costa Brito (1932–1934), who assumed office after Navarro's death, inaugurated the Paraíba Palace Hotel, where the Correio da Manhã newspaper headquarters had once stood, facing Vidal de Negreiros Square, and resumed the opening of President Epitácio Pessoa Avenue, completed in 1940, stretching five kilometers from Independence Square to Tambaú Beach.

Between January and September 1935, former mayor Walfredo Guedes Pereira returned to lead the capital. During his administration, the land where the Church of Nossa Senhora das Mercês stood was expropriated; it was demolished in 1936 to make way for what is now 1817 Square. The following year, the federal intervener Argemiro de Figueiredo inaugurated the current headquarters of Lyceu Paraibano, which since its foundation had operated beside the Redemption Palace, where the Law School of Paraíba now stands. On November 1, 1939, after three years of construction, the Archdiocese of Paraíba and the city government of João Pessoa inaugurated the new Church of Our Lady of Mercy on Padre Meira Street, just a few meters from the original church. That same year, the Parque Sólon de Lucena was officially inaugurated, and in the following year, landscape architect Burle Marx designed its gardens.

In 1940, the Aeroclube da Paraíba was founded, beginning operations on November 10 in what is now the Tambauzinho neighborhood, on the former site of the Imbiribeira Field. Starting in 1941, the state government opened the João Pessoa–Cabedelo highway to connect the capital's urban area to the Port of Cabedelo, which had been operating since 1935 at the mouth of the Paraíba River. In the same year, a survey conducted by the Brazilian Navy officially recognized Ponta do Seixas as the easternmost point of Brazilian territory, a title previously disputed with Ponta de Pedras, in Pernambuco. The Paraiban historian Coriolano de Medeiros recorded in his Dicionário Corográfico do Estado da Paraíba:

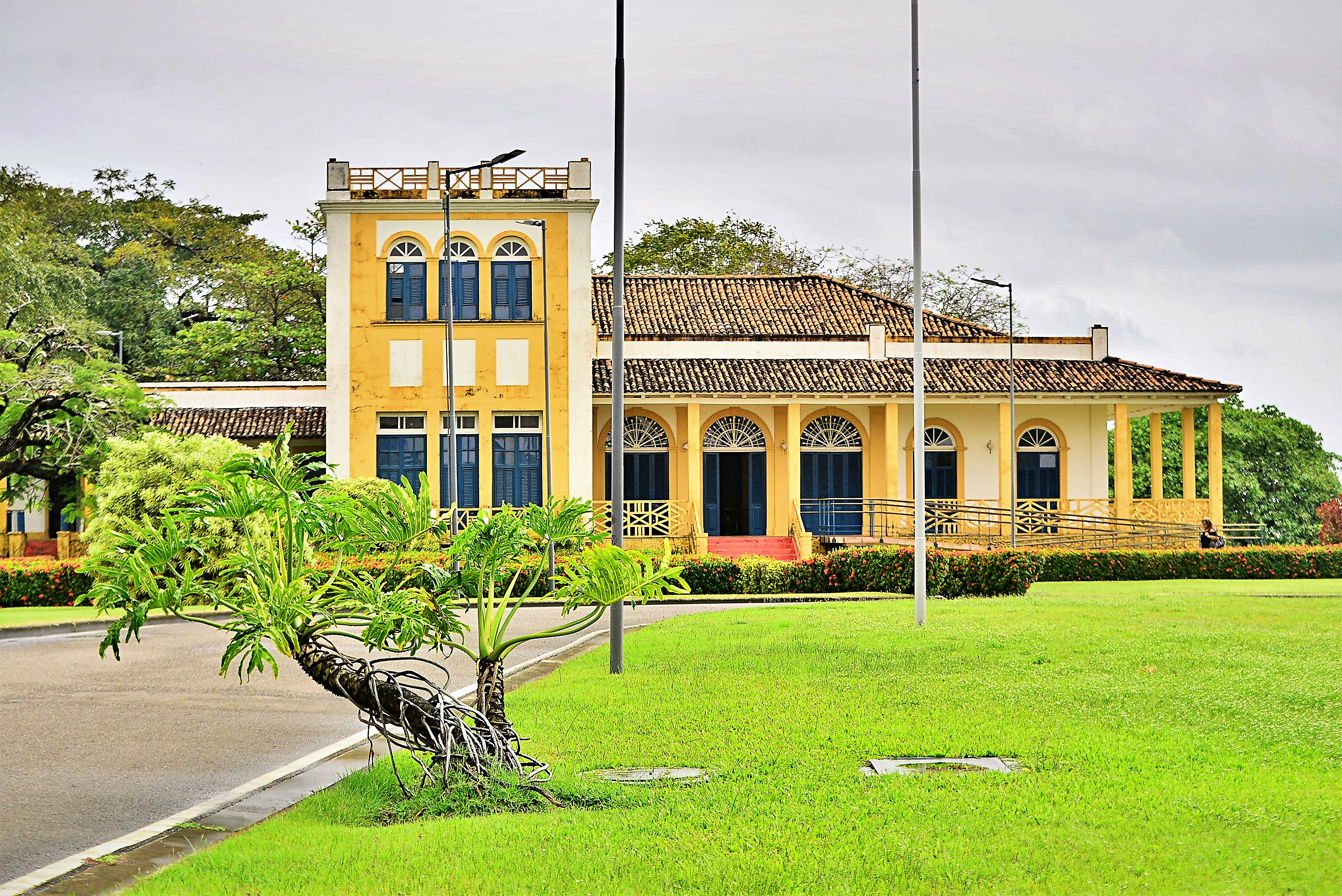
The manor house of the former Ribamar or Boi-Só farm, whose lands once encompassed part of Cabedelo and the current João Pessoa neighborhoods of Bessa, Brisamar, Estados, Ipês, Manaíra, and Pedro Gondim. The popular name Boi-Só refers to the Frenchman Boisôt, its first owner, from the Boisson family. In 1962, a chapel was built next to the manor house, and in 1980, the entire complex was listed as a historical landmark by the state. Since 2008, the farm has been located within the Alphaville condominium, on the border between the Ipês and Estados neighborhoods.

On September 5 [1941] observations were made at Ponta de Pedras, and on the 12th at Cabo Branco. Fortune smiled upon Paraíba, for Ponta do Seixas, at Cabo Branco, is the easternmost point of the national territory and, therefore, the easternmost point of the Americas. That Paraiban cape boldly projects about 1,683 meters farther east than Ponta de Pedras.

On October 12, 1947, the first direct mayoral elections in João Pessoa's history took place. Among four candidates, Osvaldo Pessoa Cavalcanti de Albuquerque, of the Social Democratic Party (PSD), brother of João Pessoa and nephew of Epitácio Pessoa, was elected with 45.56% of the valid votes. He took office on March 14, 1948, and served until 1951, when he resigned. Earlier, on October 11, 1948, the Municipal Code of Conduct came into effect.

On Christmas Eve 1952, the paving of President Epitácio Pessoa Avenue was inaugurated using cobblestones, marking a decade in which the city's urban growth became increasingly evident, with several subdivisions emerging along the avenue. These developments gave rise to the present-day neighborhoods of Brisamar, Cabo Branco, Estados, Expedicionários, Miramar, Pedro Gondim, Tambauzinho, Torre, and Tambaú, consolidating the city's expansion from the center toward the ocean. Much of this land had once belonged to the Ribamar or Boi-Só Farm, whose first owner was the Frenchman Boisôt, from the Boisson family, in the 19th century.

In 1953, the Bust of Tamandaré was inaugurated and the Paraíba Aeroclub was relocated to an area expropriated by the state government, in what is now the Aeroclube neighborhood. Later in the same decade, Tambaú Beach received its first promenade, along with the opening of Almirante Tamandaré Avenue. Starting in 1958, construction began on the Edifício Presidente João Pessoa, an eighteen-story building that became the city's first skyscraper, completed in the early 1960s.

Between the 1940s and 1950s, João Pessoa's population grew by 26.5%, from 94,333 inhabitants in 1940 to 119,326 in 1950. Within the state, it ranked second, behind Campina Grande (173,206). By 1960, after the emancipation of the districts of Cabedelo (1956) and Alhandra (1959), the population reached 153,175, still behind Campina Grande (204,583).

=== 1960s and 1970s ===
In 1961, João Pessoa lost the district of Pitimbu, which was elevated to the status of a municipality, and in 1963, the Vila do Conde, now the municipality of Conde, also became independent. That same year, the industrial district of João Pessoa was created, and starting in 1965, the campus of the Federal University of Paraíba (UFPB) began construction, stimulating urban growth to the south and southeast of the city. Near the campus, three housing complexes were developed between 1969 and 1974, forming the present-day Castelo Branco neighborhood. Two other factors driving the city's growth at the time were the extension of Avenida Pedro II and the opening of the current Avenida Cruz das Armas.

João Pessoa nos anos 1970

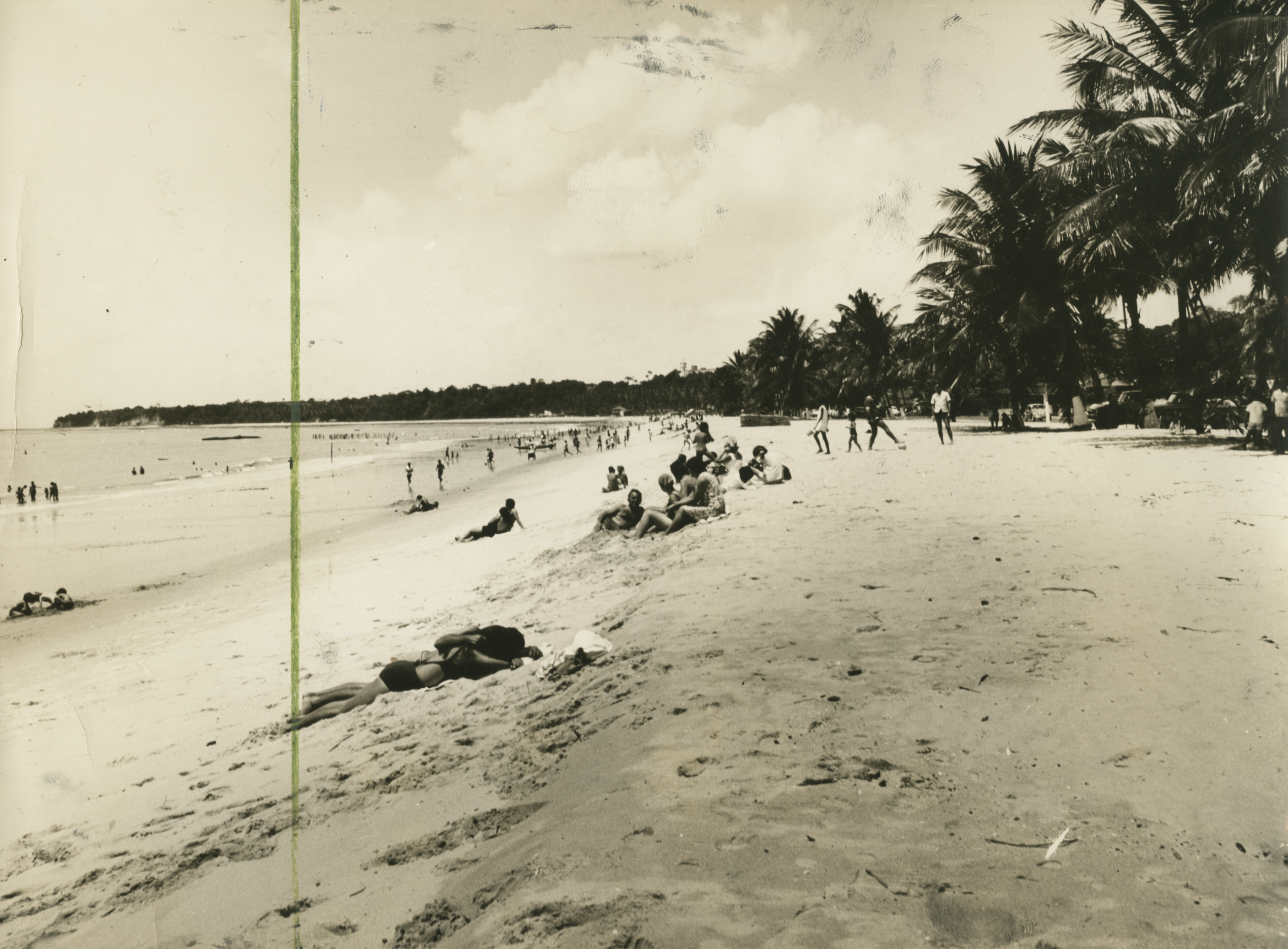
Tambaú and Cabo Branco beaches in September 1970

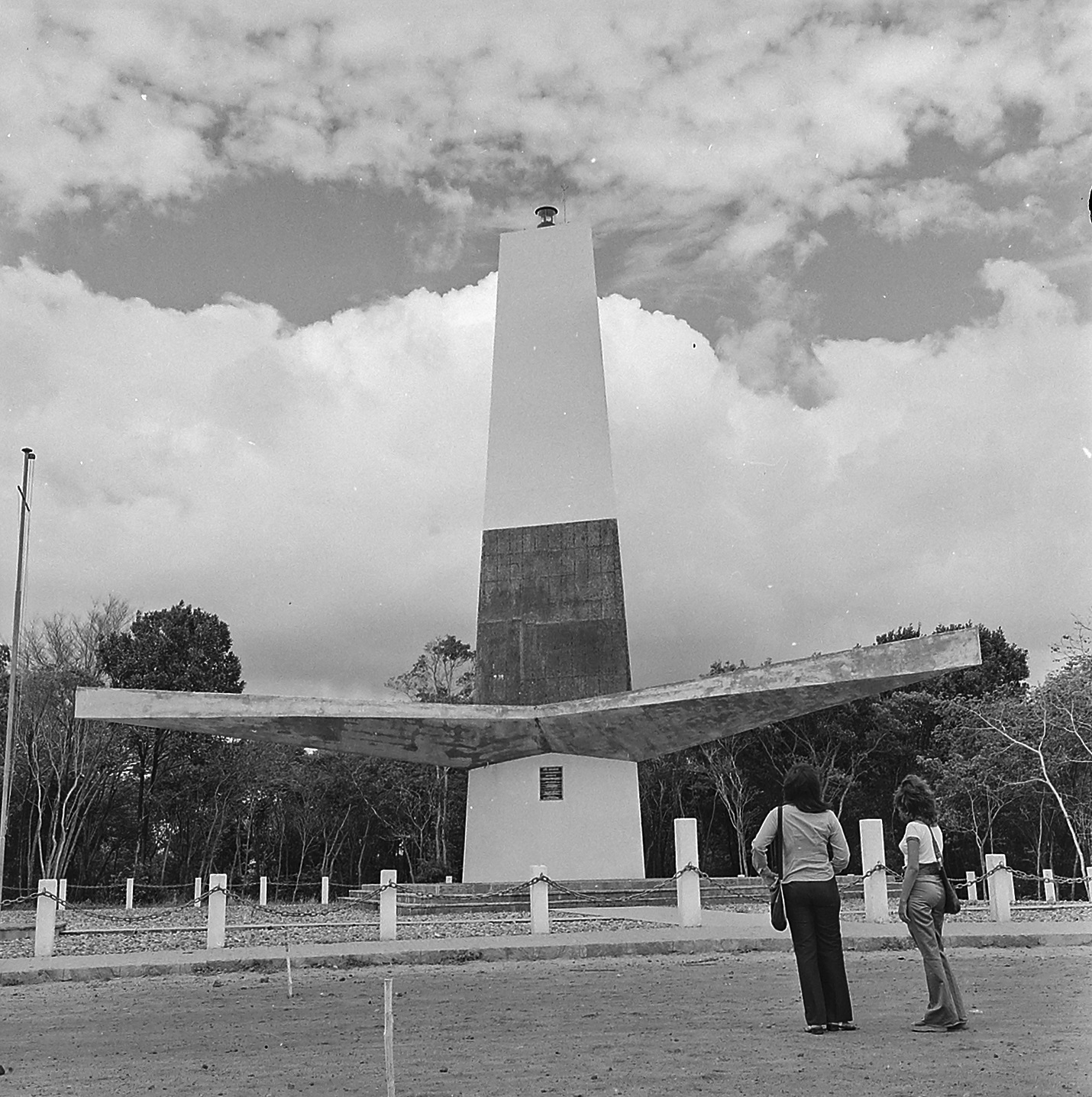
The Cabo Branco Lighthouse in 1974, two years after its inauguration

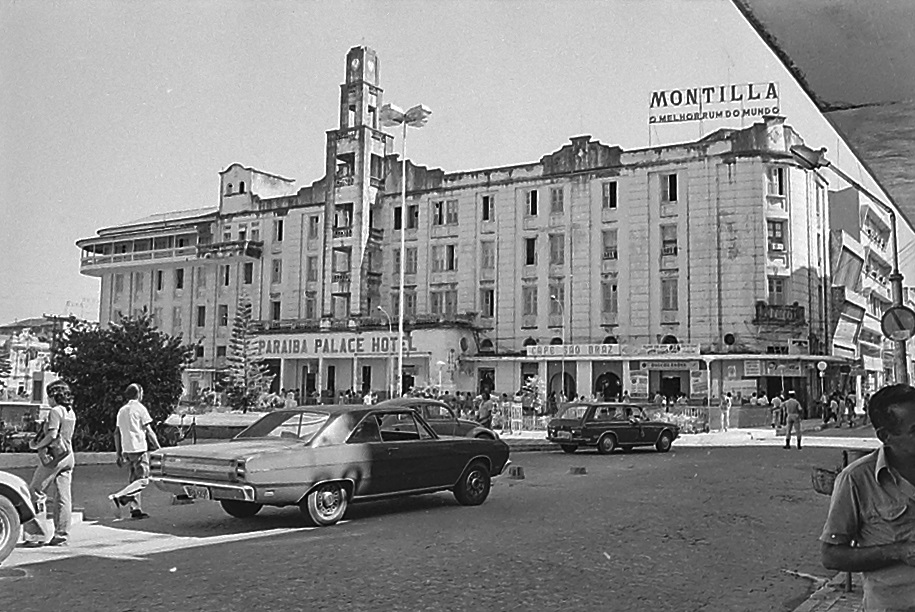
Paraíba Palace Hotel, now Paraíba Palace Shopping, in 1974

On February 5, 1966, during Brazil's military regime, President Humberto de Alencar Castelo Branco enacted Institutional Act No. 3, which imposed indirect elections for state governors, who would then appoint the mayors of their capitals. As a result, Mayor Domingos Mendonça Neto, elected in 1963, had his mandate revoked, and former mayor Damásio Barbosa de Franca was appointed in his place, serving for five years. During his administration, the paving of Atlântica Avenue, now Senator Ruy Carneiro Avenue, began, starting from Epitácio Pessoa Avenue and connecting it to Manaíra beach.

In June 1969, construction began on the Viaduto Damásio de Franca, named in honor of the mayor, which was inaugurated on July 17, 1970. In the 1970 census, João Pessoa became the most populous municipality in Paraíba, with 221,546 inhabitants, surpassing Campina Grande (195,303), which had lost territory due to the creation of new municipalities. That same year, amid increasing verticalization of the city, a state constitutional amendment of 1967 limited high-rise construction along the coastal strip to two floors, between Penha and Formosa beaches, the latter in Cabedelo.

After its construction began in 1969, Governor João Agripino inaugurated the Tambaú Hotel on March 6, 1971, just days before the end of his term. The hotel, designed by architect Sérgio Bernardes and built on the Tambaú Beach sands, was reopened on September 11 by Agripino's successor, Ernâni Sátiro. On April 20, 1972, the municipal coat of arms, flag, and banner were officially established by municipal law, and the city received the Cabo Branco Lighthouse on the cliff near Ponta do Seixas the following day. In the same year, Senador Ruy Carneiro Avenue was fully paved. Additionally, the first section of the BR-230 highway in the city was paved; it originally served as the João Pessoa Bypass, connecting the João Pessoa–Cabedelo Road (federalized and incorporated into the highway) to BR-101 at the junction with Avenida Cruz das Armas. At the time, the city was administered by Mayor Dorgival Terceiro Neto (1971–1974).

In 1973, the city gained two major avenues: Avenida Beira-Rio (renamed Avenida Ministro José Américo de Almeida in 1977), connecting the city center to Cabo Branco Beach, and Avenida Governador Flávio Ribeiro Coutinho, known as the “Retão de Manaíra”, which, together with Avenida Governador Argemiro de Figueiredo, facilitated northward expansion toward Bessa Beach and Cabedelo. At the same time, the city also expanded southwest and south, with new housing developments. In 1974, the Urban Development Plan (PDU) was drafted, resulting in the Urbanism Code, established by Municipal Law 2,102 on December 31, 1975.

On March 9, 1975, the Ernani Sátiro Stadium was inaugurated by the state government, with an inaugural match between Botafogo of João Pessoa and Botafogo of Rio de Janeiro, won 2–0 by the visiting team. The stadium was renamed José Américo de Almeida Filho Stadium the following year, in honor of a former Botafogo João Pessoa striker from the 1930s and son of ex-governor José Américo de Almeida. On August 24, 1975, during Soldier's Day celebrations, Parque Sólon de Lucena was the site of the Baltrão Tragedy, when a ferry carrying about 200 passengers—over three times its capacity—capsized, killing 35 people by drowning, including 29 children.

By the late 1970s, new subdivisions emerged along the highway, giving rise to the present-day neighborhoods of Água Fria, Ernesto Geisel, and José Américo. At the same time, construction began on a road connecting BR-230 to Praia da Penha, now Hilton Souto Maior Avenue, replacing the old Penha Road and becoming the city's longest avenue, stretching 7.5 km.

=== 1980s and 1990s ===
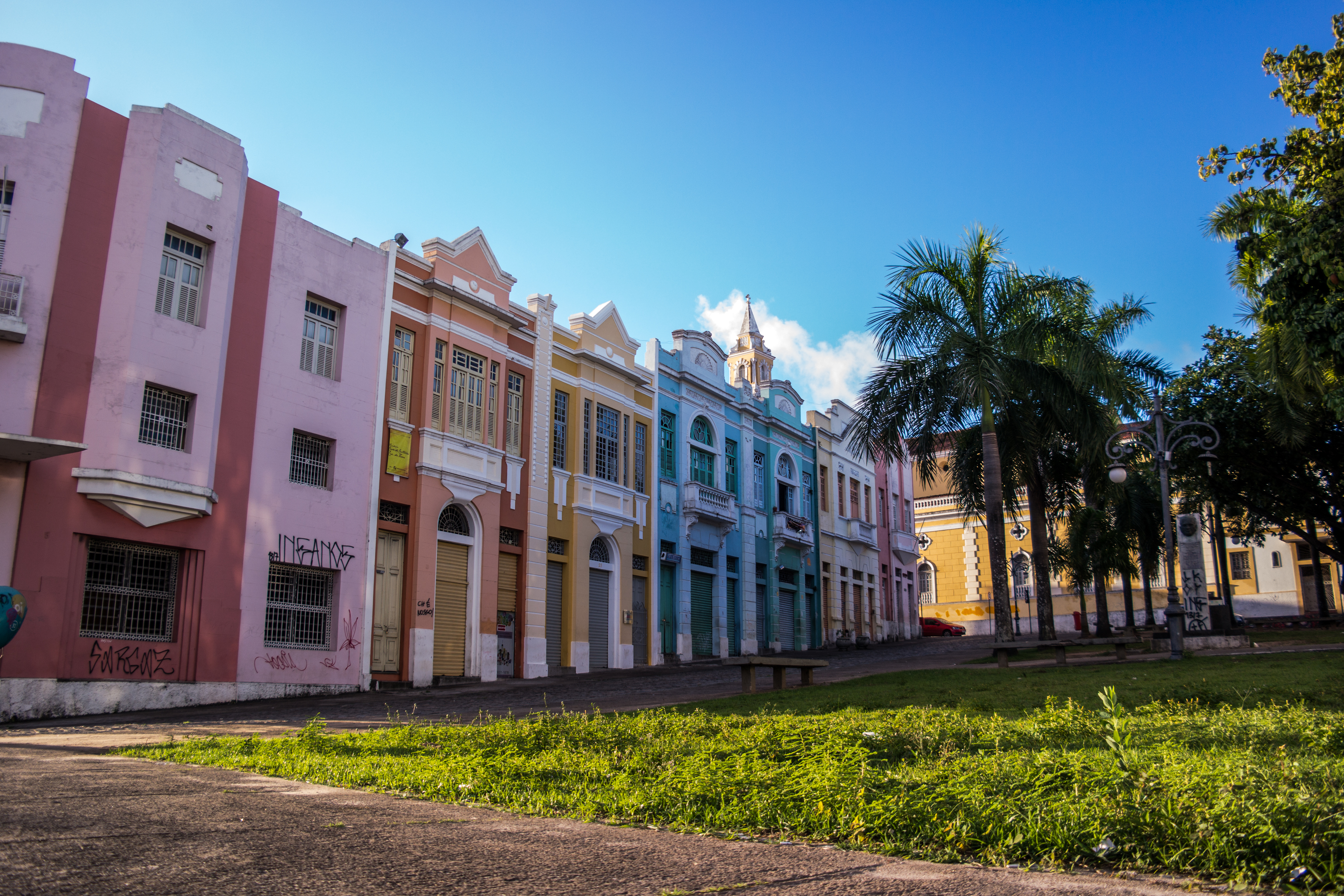
Revitalized buildings in the Historic Center of João Pessoa, around Antenor Navarro Square

By 1980, João Pessoa had a population of 329,942, up from 221,546 in 1970, reflecting decades of urban and demographic growth. That year, the Institute of Historical and Artistic Heritage of the State of Paraíba (IPHAEP) listed several city monuments and historic sites for protection. In 1982, the boundaries of the Historic Center were defined, encompassing 117 hectares. In April 1982, João Pessoa gained the José Lins do Rego Cultural Space, located on the site of the former Paraíba Aeroclub. In June 1983, the Tarcísio de Miranda Burity Housing Complex was inaugurated, giving rise to the Mangabeira neighborhood, named after the many mangaba trees in the area. The following year, the Valentina de Figueiredo Residential Park was inaugurated (now the Valentina neighborhood), extending urban growth beyond the Cuiá River. Its name honored Valentina Silva de Oliveira Figueiredo, mother of then-President João Figueiredo, who participated in the inauguration.

In 1985, João Pessoa celebrated its 400th anniversary. That same year, after the end of the military regime, the city returned to direct mayoral elections. Antônio Carneiro Arnaud won, serving from 1986 to 1988, succeeded by Wilson Braga, former governor of Paraíba. In 1989, the revitalization of the historic center began, led by the state government in partnership with the National Institute of Historic and Artistic Heritage (IPHAN), starting with Praça Dom Adauto and Praça São Francisco and later expanding throughout the 1990s. The city also inaugurated the Manaíra Shopping Center, now the largest in Paraíba. That year, the current Constitution of Paraíba was enacted, declaring the state's entire coastal zone as protected heritage, maintaining the prohibition on high-rise buildings along the shoreline established in 1970. The Constitution also included a provision for a plebiscite on the city's name, which was never held.

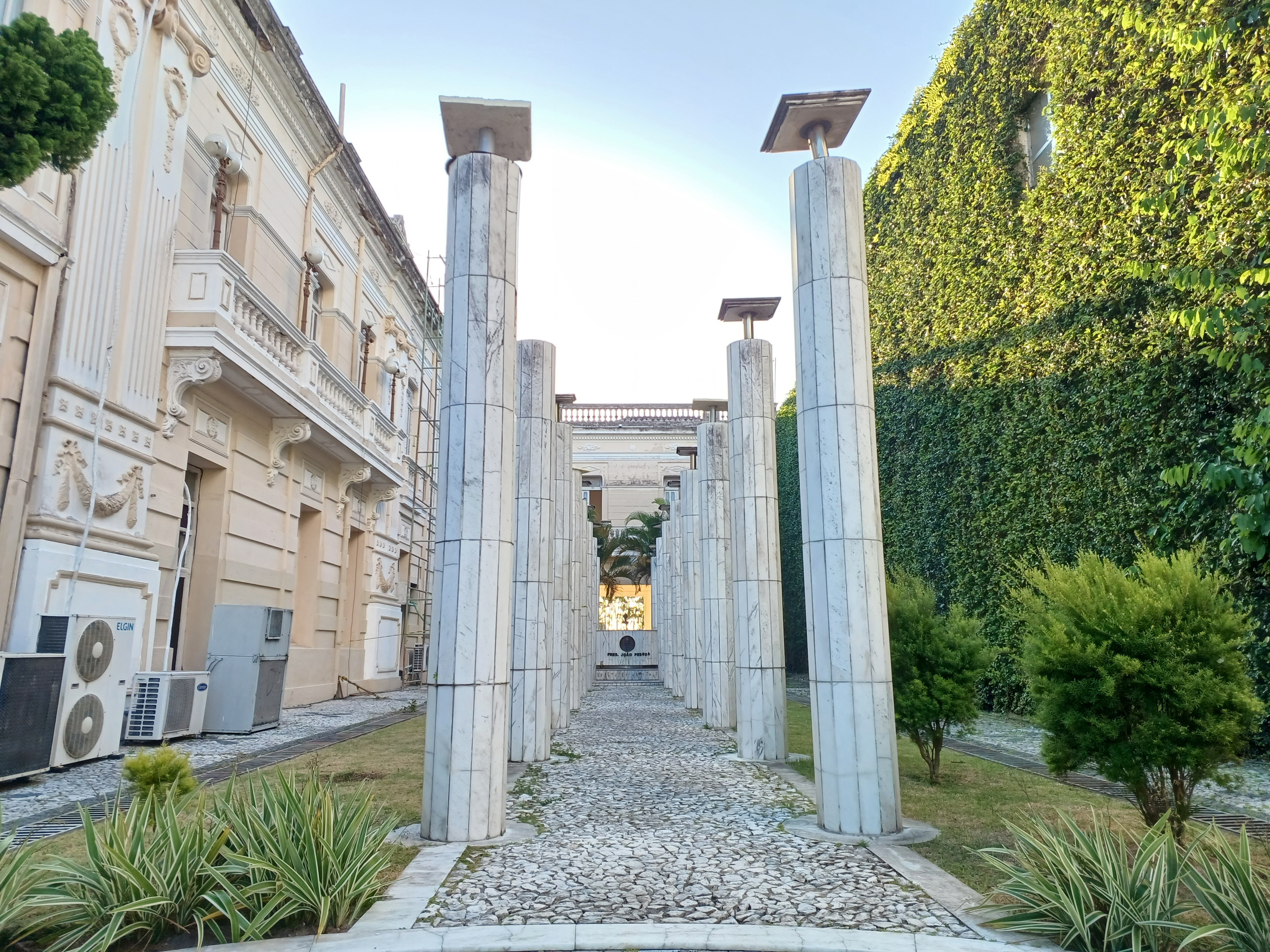
The João Pessoa Mausoleum, where the remains of the former president of Paraíba and his wife Maria Luíza have been since 1997, transferred from Rio de Janeiro

On April 2, 1990, the current municipal organic law was enacted, later amended over time. In the early 1990s, the urban stretch of BR-230 was duplicated. By 1991, João Pessoa's population reached 497,600, a 51% increase from 1980. In 1992, during the Earth Summit in Rio de Janeiro, Mayor Carlos Mangueira declared João Pessoa the second greenest city in the world, after Paris. On December 30, 1992, the municipal master plan was enacted, serving as the basic framework for urban policy. Two days later, Francisco Franca, son of former mayor Damásio Franca, took office, serving until 1996, when Cícero Lucena was elected.

In 1997, the remains of João Pessoa and his wife were transferred from Rio de Janeiro to João Pessoa, interred in a mausoleum built by the state government near the Redemption Palace and the Paraíba Law School. The same year, Pope John Paul II elevated the Cathedral of Our Lady of the Snows to basilica status after major structural renovations under Bishop Dom Marcelo Carvalheira.

=== 2000s-Present ===
On August 28, 2000, the Mata do Buraquinho was transformed into a botanical garden, named Benjamin Maranhão. On October 1, 2000, Cícero Lucena was re-elected with 74.02% of the vote, becoming the first mayor in João Pessoa's history to win a second term. During his second term, the orla promenade along Cabo Branco and Tambaú Avenues was renovated, and the avenues themselves were widened, along with Avenida Governador Flávio Ribeiro Coutinho (Retão de Manaíra). At the end of 2003, the Metropolitan Region of João Pessoa (RMJP) was created, initially consisting of the capital and eight municipalities.

In 2005, Ricardo Coutinho succeeded Lucena, elected in the first round in 2004. In December 2007, the Historic Center of João Pessoa became a national heritage site, and in July 2008, the Cabo Branco Science, Culture, and Arts Station, designed by Oscar Niemeyer, was inaugurated near the Cabo Branco Lighthouse. Ricardo was re-elected in October 2008, then resigned on March 31, 2010, to run for governor of Paraíba, a position he held from 2011 to 2018.

In August 2012, João Pessoa inaugurated its current convention center, housing the largest theater in the Northeast, the Teatro Pedra do Reino, which opened in August 2015. From 2013 to 2020, the city was administered by Luciano Cartaxo, during which the Largo de Tambaú was inaugurated at the boundary of Tambaú and Cabo Branco beaches. In November 2020, Cícero Lucena was elected for his third term, and in 2024, he was re-elected for a fourth term, becoming the first mayor in the city’s history to achieve this milestone.

Finally, on December 17, 2024, the Legislative Assembly of Paraíba approved a constitutional amendment removing the provision for a plebiscite on the city's name, officially confirming João Pessoa as the capital's name.

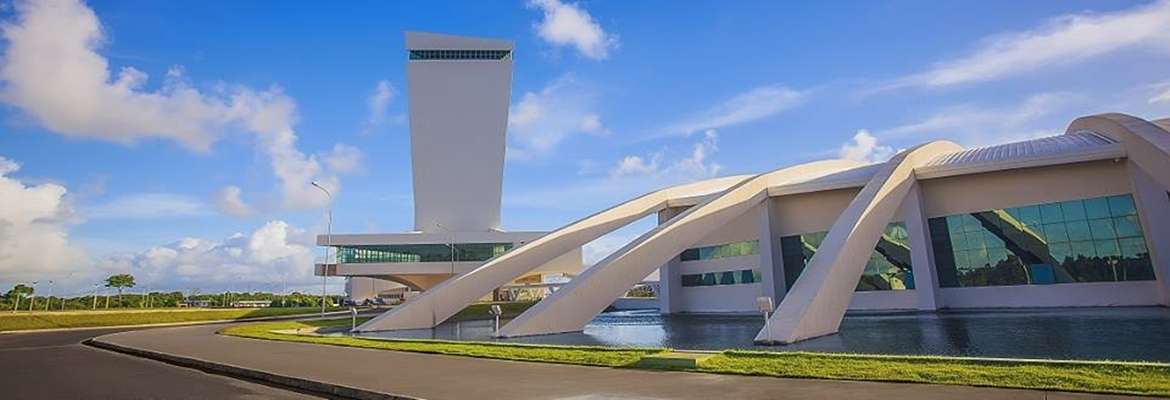
The João Pessoa Convention Center, named after the poet and politician from Paraíba, Ronaldo Cunha Lima (1936–2012)

== Geography ==
=== Environment ===
João Pessoa has 20 kilometres (12 mi) of beachfront.

João Pessoa has many green areas distributed among its avenues, parks, and residential neighborhoods, supporting its claim as "the second greenest city in the world" with more than 7 square kilometres (2.7 sq mi) of forested land, second only to Paris. This claim is a matter of conjecture, however, originating from a publicity stunt carried out by the city's mayor during an Earth Summit.

The city has a Benjamin Maranhão Botanical Garden, which preserves the Atlantic forest, the animals, and opens the visitation, which is the João Pessoa Botanical Garden, considered one of the largest remains of the natural Atlantic Forest in an urban area of Brazil. . Environmental education affords interesting approaches, from knowledge and interest in plants to stimulating curiosity and knowledge of this space for visitation and research.

There are 18 stations distributed along the Rio and Preguiça trails using as criteria elements mainly related to history, botany and ecology, contributing to knowledge of the environment and the need for its preservation. The area has about 515ha, of which 343ha are home to the Botanical Garden, where the flora is not very soft in the recreational and educational activities promoted on the spot. It includes the largest natural urban Atlantic forest reserve in the country, and an important historical heritage of the capital of Paraíba.

=== Hydrography ===
In João Pessoa, there are about twelve rivers. The Jaguaribe River is born in the Esplanada complex, crosses the Benjamim Maranhão Botanical Garden, in the middle of the Atlantic Forest, and flows into the Atlantic Ocean on the border with the municipality of Cabedelo. The water to supply the houses is taken from the Gramame-Mumbaba system, from the Paraíba Water and Sewerage Company. In this system, these two rivers take turns to supply the city with water. However, the most historically important river is the Sanhauá River, because it was on its banks that the city was born and where the first houses were built.

There is also the Solón de Lucena Park Lagoon in the City Center. The lagoon was the main tourist spot in the city during the time when most of the city was far from the beaches. At the end of 2010, during the Christmas celebrations, the lagoon was revitalized and gained devices such as ambient music.

The capital of Paraíba has a coastline of about 24 kilometers in length, nine beaches in the municipality alone, in addition to the beaches of the Metropolitan Region, such as the city of Cabedelo, the city of Lucena and the District of Jacumã in the municipality of Conde, where the Tambaba Naturist Beach is located. Urban beaches are characterized by white sand beaches and crystal clear waters. Many have preserved the Atlantic Forest, as well as being ideal for bathing thanks to a natural barrier about 6 kilometers from the coast that protects a large part of the Pessoa and Cabedelo coast, allowing children to play in the calm waters. There is the Urban Tartarugas Project, which operates on the beaches of Bessa and Intermares, a spawning area for the hawksbill turtle, a scenario for environmental preservation. Surfing is also practiced in the city.

Among the main beaches, we can mention the Praia de Tambau, composed of fine, beaten sand, with blue-green waters; the bessa beach is where the caribessa is located, a quiet beach with crystalline waters; also the Praia de Manaíra, a totally urban beach, formed by coral reefs, which makes its waves weak and clear water in summer. It is the point of several kiosks and bars, with sports fields on its edge. The Cabo Branco beach, white sand and warm water; Playa Seixas, which is where the most eastern point of America is located. In addition to Praia da Penha, where the historic Chapel of Our Lady of Penha, built in 1763, where the penha pilgrimage takes place every year, from the historic center to the beach.; The Jacarape beach, where the Poet Ronaldo Cunha Lima Convention Center is located; then Praia do Sol, which is a quiet and airy place; and the barra de gramame beach, which situates the meeting of the river gramme with the sea.

=== Climate ===
João Pessoa has a tropical monsoon climate (Köppen Am) with very warm to hot temperatures all year long and strong rainfall in most of the months; however, October to December have rather low rainfall.

Climate data for João Pessoa (1991–2020 normals, extremes 1931–present)
Month	Jan	Feb	Mar	Apr	May	Jun	Jul	Aug	Sep	Oct	Nov	Dec	Year
Record high °C (°F)	34.9 (94.8)	34.5 (94.1)	34.3 (93.7)	34.3 (93.7)	34.1 (93.4)	32.8 (91.0)	33.0 (91.4)	31.8 (89.2)	32.4 (90.3)	33.3 (91.9)	34.3 (93.7)	33.7 (92.7)	34.9 (94.8)
Mean daily maximum °C (°F)	30.9 (87.6)	31.1 (88.0)	31.2 (88.2)	30.8 (87.4)	30.3 (86.5)	29.2 (84.6)	28.7 (83.7)	28.9 (84.0)	29.4 (84.9)	30.1 (86.2)	30.6 (87.1)	30.9 (87.6)	30.2 (86.4)
Mean daily minimum °C (°F)	25.1 (77.2)	25.0 (77.0)	24.8 (76.6)	24.1 (75.4)	23.4 (74.1)	22.3 (72.1)	21.9 (71.4)	21.9 (71.4)	23.1 (73.6)	24.4 (75.9)	25.1 (77.2)	25.2 (77.4)	23.9 (75.0)
Record low °C (°F)	19.0 (66.2)	18.8 (65.8)	19.0 (66.2)	19.0 (66.2)	17.0 (62.6)	17.0 (62.6)	16.2 (61.2)	15.0 (59.0)	17.9 (64.2)	18.6 (65.5)	17.8 (64.0)	18.7 (65.7)	15.0 (59.0)
Average precipitation mm (inches)	86.4 (3.40)	106.2 (4.18)	171.5 (6.75)	235.7 (9.28)	287.7 (11.33)	368.7 (14.52)	284.9 (11.22)	133.7 (5.26)	73.9 (2.91)	31.0 (1.22)	21.1 (0.83)	36.6 (1.44)	1,837.4 (72.34)
Average precipitation days (≥ 1.0 mm)	9	9	12	16	17	20	20	16	10	6	5	5	145
Average relative humidity (%)	74.2	74.2	75.4	78.0	79.9	82.1	81.0	77.4	74.2	72.4	72.5	73.1	76.2
Mean monthly sunshine hours	241.1	215.7	226.5	201.0	198.6	165.0	180.3	224.0	232.3	266.1	263.6	258.8	2,673
Source: Brazilian National Institute of Meteorology (INMET)

== Demographics ==
According to the 2022 census, João Pessoa had a population of 833,932. Its racial makeup was 50.6% Pardo (two or more races), 39.7% White, 9.2% Black, 0.2% Amerindian and 0.1% Asian.

== Transportation ==
=== International airport ===
Joao Pessoa is served by Presidente Castro Pinto International Airport.

=== Rail system ===
The João Pessoa Urban Trains System is operated by diesel components on one railway line with a 30 km extension spanning four municipalities, João Pessoa, Cabedelo, Bayeux and Santa Rita, constituted by the Cabedelo stretch, with 10 stations in operation, carrying around 10,100 passengers a day. Composed of three locomotives and 17 passenger cars, the trains form two compositions that conduct 28 trips a day.

== Economy ==
João Pessoa's Gross Domestic Product (GDP) was R$ 14,841,805 as of 2010.

The city's per capita income was R$ 19,284 as of 2010.

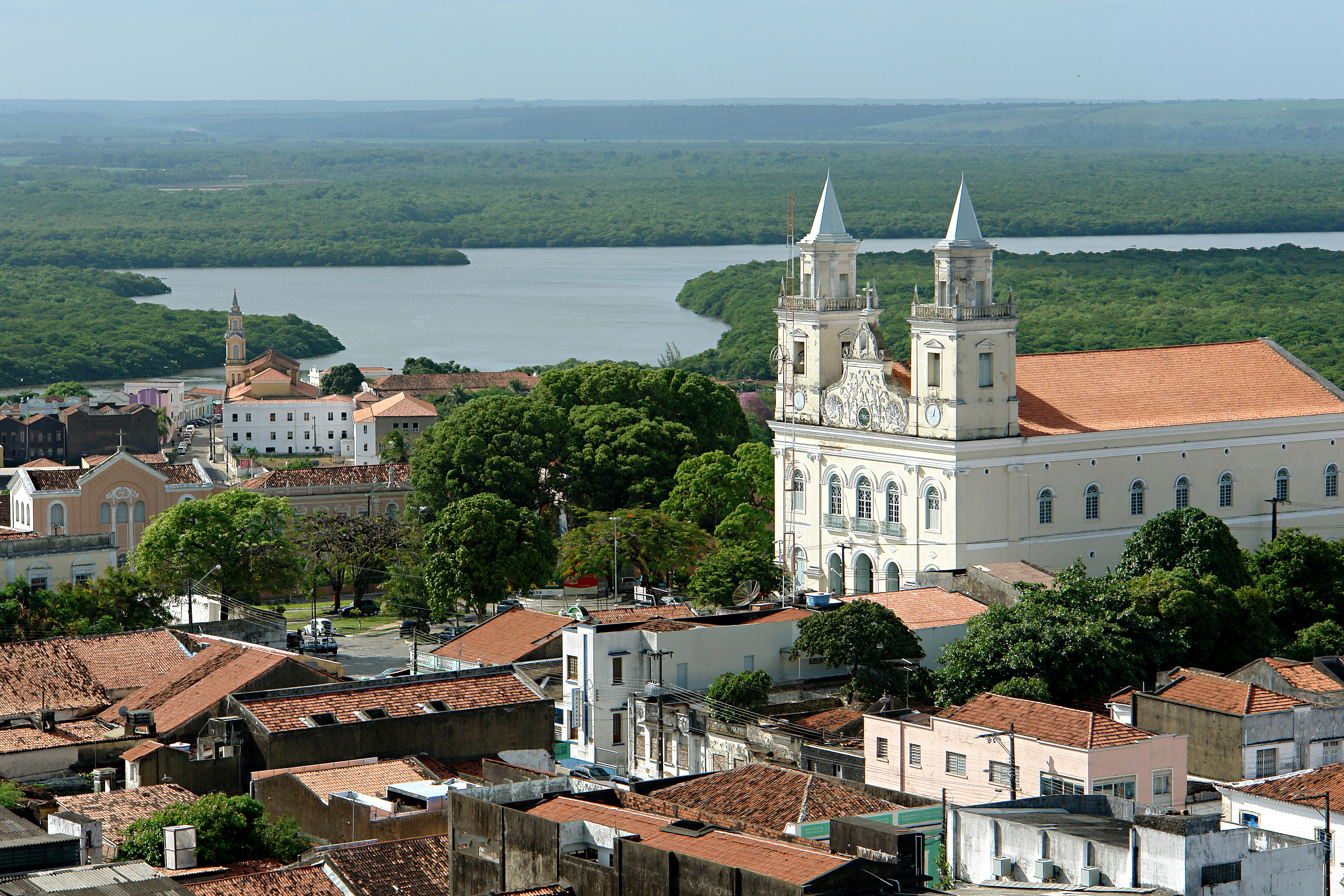
Historic center of João Pessoa.

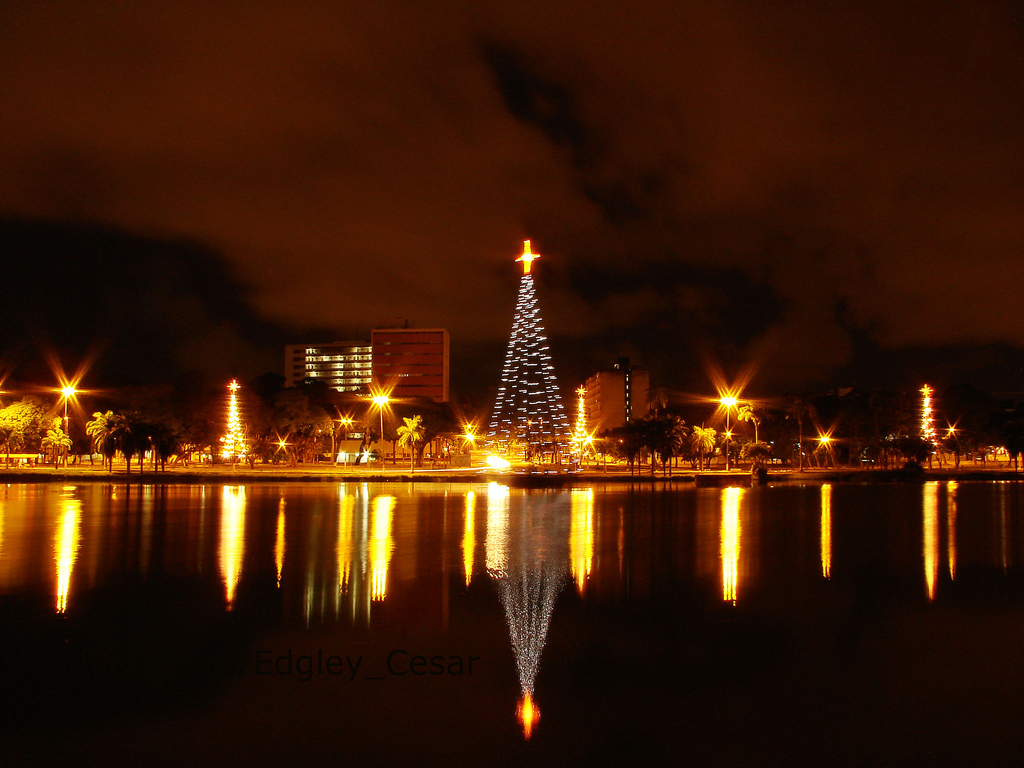
Solon de Lucena Park's lagoon at night in the northwestern region (the downtown zone or district).

João Pessoa's evening skyline (center-eastern region).

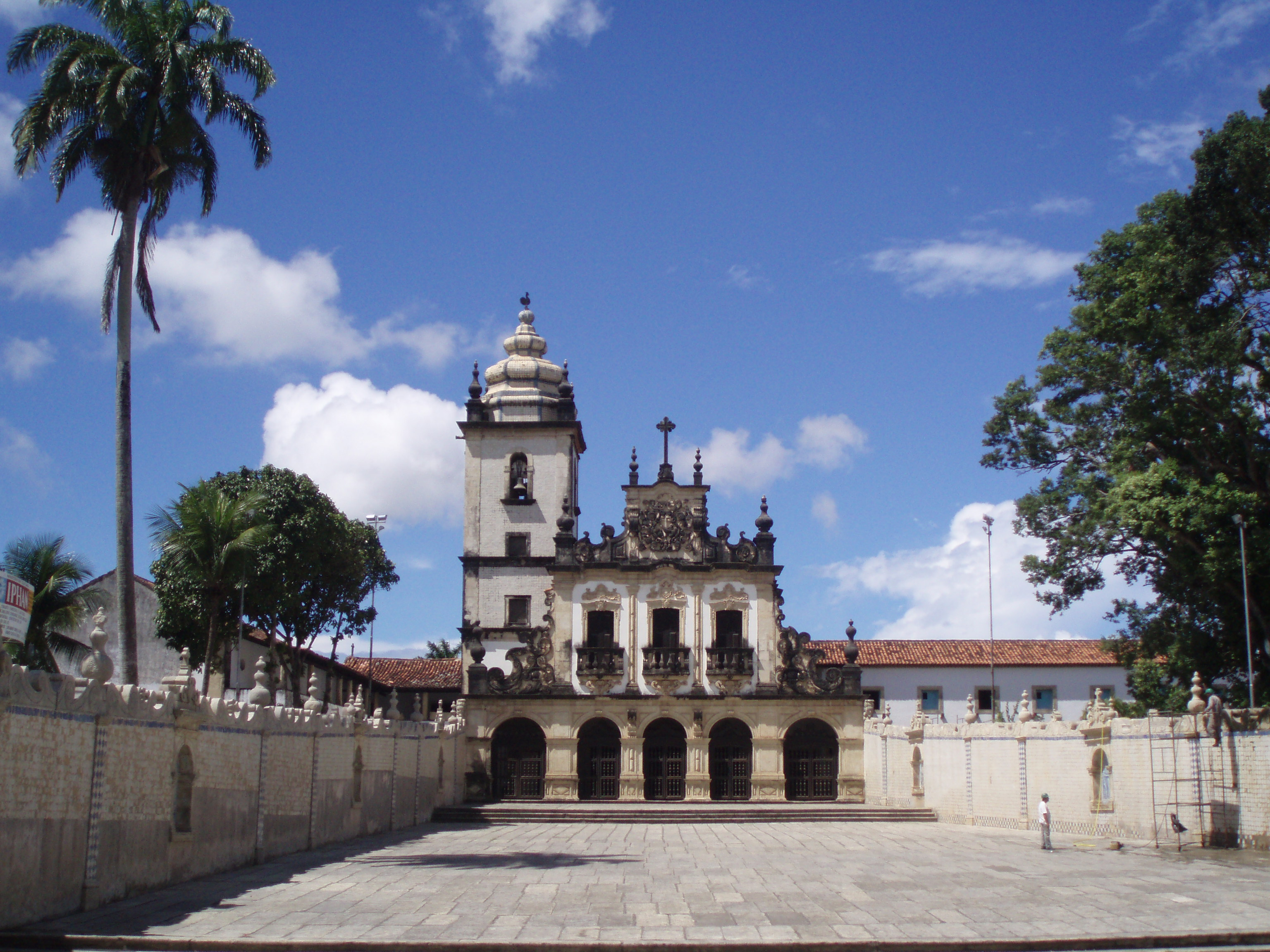
Saint Francis Church and Saint Anthony Convent (northern region).

== Tourism ==
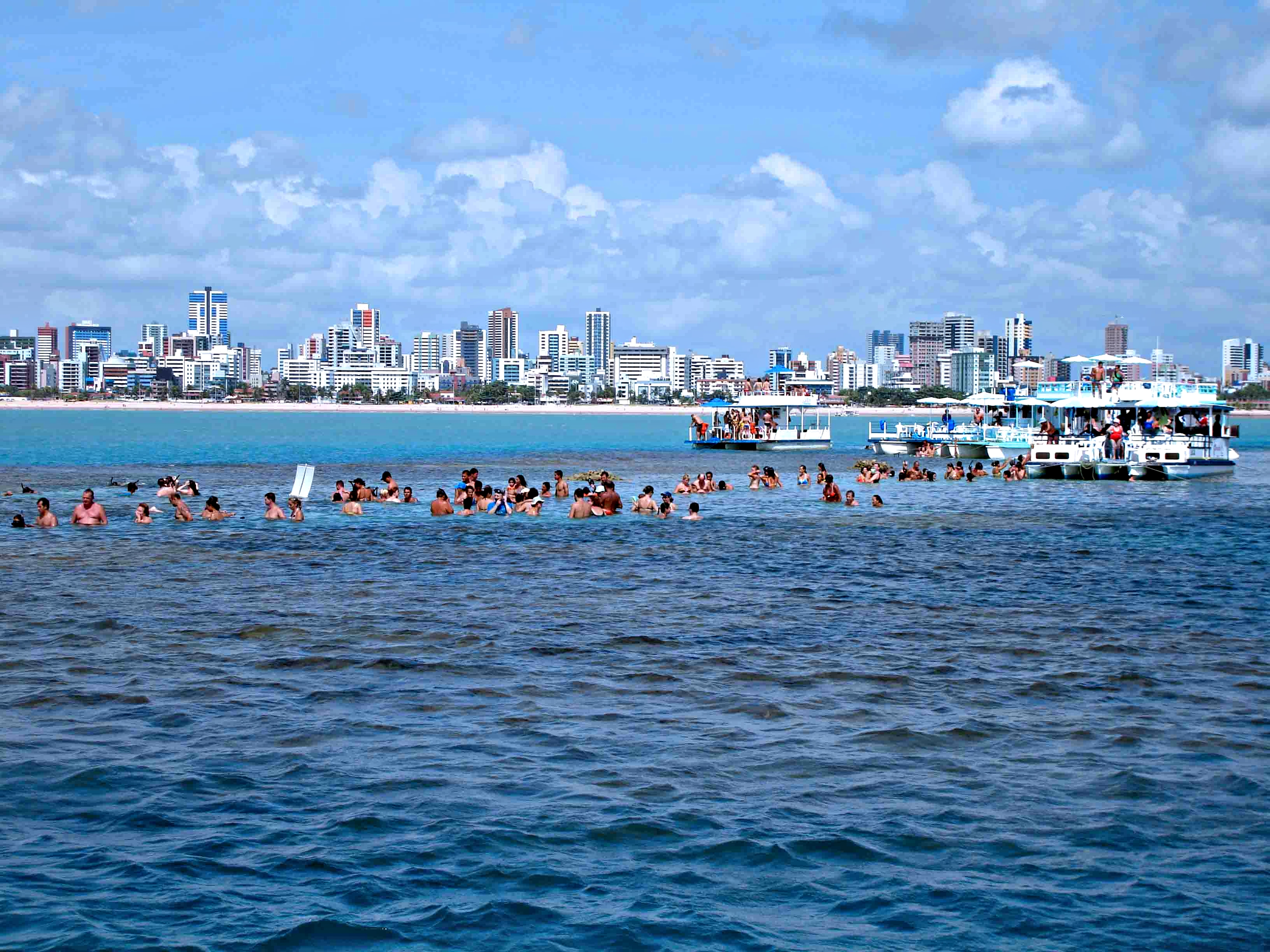
Picãozinho

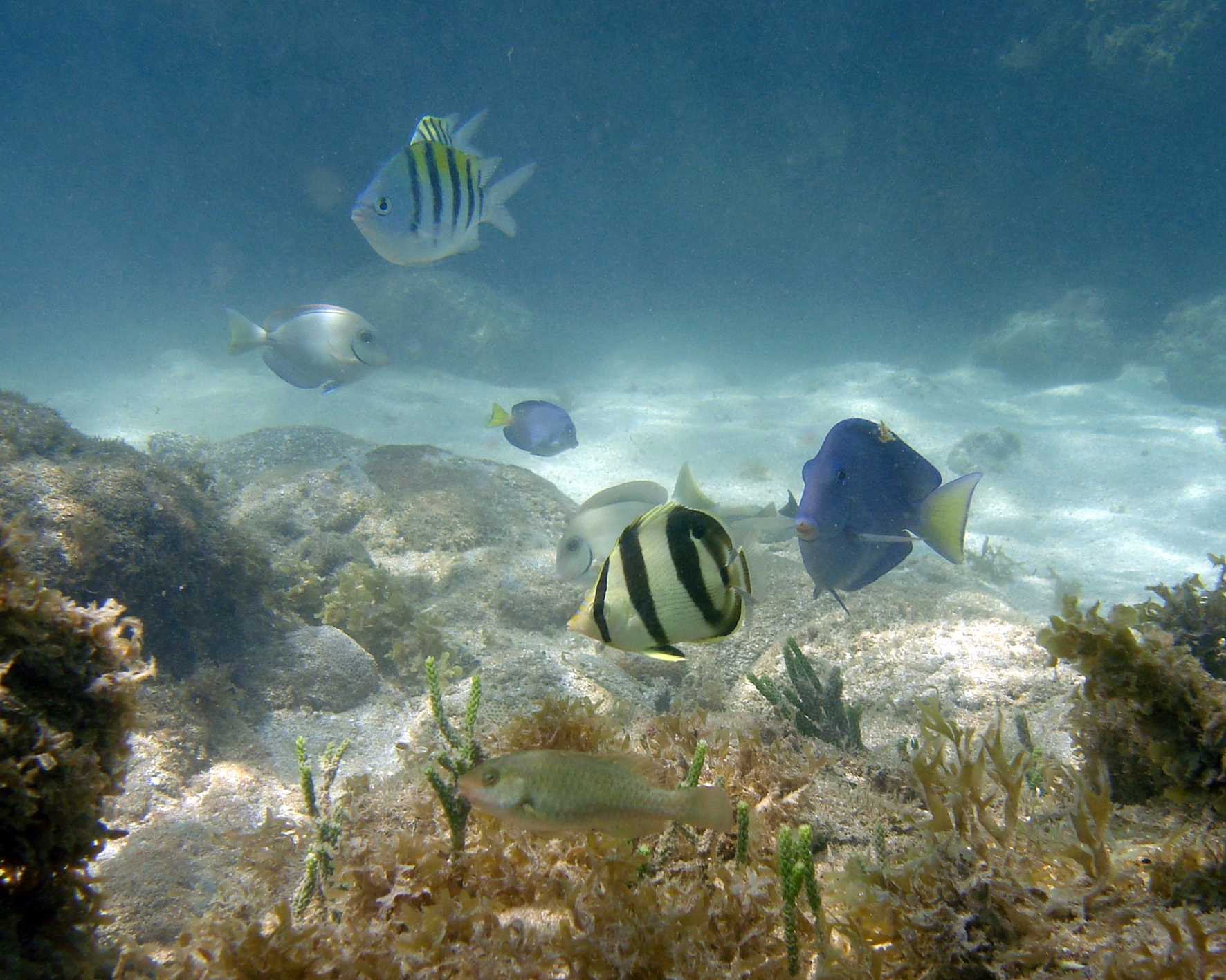
Reef fish found on the Picãozinho reef.

- Picãozinho: One of the city's most significant sights is the São Reef Formation, located about 1,500 metres (5,000 ft) from Tambaú Beach on the coast of João Pessoa.
- Natural Pools of Seixas Beach: The Seixas Natural Pools, where hundreds of species of fish, seaweed, reptiles (sea turtles), mollusks, crustaceans and other marine organisms are found.
- Penha Beach: This traditional beach's name derives from the symbol of one of the great religious events in Brazil: the Chapel of Our Lady of Penha. For more than 250 years, thousands of faithful have been accompanying the Penha Procession through the streets of João Pessoa.
- Manaira Beach: Joao Pessoa's most economically developed neighborhood. Its sidewalks are commonly used for physical activities and are well frequented by tourists and locals.
- Beach Tambaú: The sands of Praia de Tambaú are one of the busiest in Joao Pessoa.
- Bessa Beach: At the extreme north of João Pessoa, with 5.3 km (3.3 mi) of white sand beach beside calm green waters, reefs and coconut trees, Bessa Beach is among the most sought after by tourists.
- Seixas Beach: This beach is situated on the easternmost end of the Americas. Nationally known as the land area closest to the African continent, Praia do Seixas.
- Convention Center Poet Ronaldo Cunha Lima: The convention center of João Pessoa has four main buildings, the Lookout Tower, the Congress and Convention Hall, and the Pedra do Reino Theater.
- Espaço Cultural José Lins do Rego: Built through a project developed by architect Sérgio Bernardes, it includes the Archidy Picado Gallery, Lutheria, Planetarium, José Lins do Rêgo Museum, Anthenor Navarro Music School, Arena Theater, Paulo Pontes Theater.

== Museums ==
- Museu Sacro e de Arte Popular, within the São Francisco church.
- Espaço Cultural José Lins do Rego. A cultural centre including history and science museums.
- City Museum. The former Casa da Pólvora, an old gunpowder store.
- Museu Fotográfico Walfredo Rodríguez.
- Bica Natural History Museum.
- Museum Foundation house of Jose Américo.
- Hotel Globo Museum: Formerly a luxury hotel in the city, it consists of two buildings of eclectic style, with its lines influenced by Neo-classical, Art Nouveau and Art Deco styles. Today it functions as a museum, where it houses the permanent exhibition of part of the hotel's furniture in addition to a collection of popular art. It is frequently visited for its view of the Sanhauá River and the sunset seen from its garden.

== Culture ==
The Historic Center of João Pessoa, recognized as National Institute of Historic and Artistic Heritage in December 2007, covers areas in the neighborhoods of the center, Róger, Jaguaribe, Tambiá and Varadouro. There are listed 37 hectares in area and estimated around 700 buildings, in addition to streets, squares and historic parks that integrate this set, comprising most of the neighborhoods of Varadouro and the Center of the city. Its buildings make up a scenario of different styles and eras full of townhouses, squares, colonial houses and secular churches, being considered the main architectural collection of Paraíba, reporting the various phases of local history, and one of the largest and most important historical sites in Brazil.

The delimited area has assets that represent various periods in the history of João Pessoa, such as the baroque of the Igreja da Ordem Terceira de São Francisco; from the rococo of the Church and Convent of the Third Order of Our Lady of Carmo, Cathedral Basilica of Our Lady of the Snows; of the Neoclassical architecture of the Church of Saint Peter Gonzalez, Church and Convent of Our Lady of the Rosary, of the Baroque architecture of the São Francisco Cultural Center, Monastery of St. Benedict, of the Mannerist style of the Church of Our Lady of Mercy, all from the 17th century; of the colonial architecture and eclectic architecture of civil houses, in addition to Art Nouveau and Art Deco, from the 20s and 30s decades, predominant in square Antenor Navarro and in the former Hotel Globo, now transformed into a cultural center.

== Sports ==
=== Stadiums ===
- José Américo de Almeida Filho Stadium
- Stadium of Grace

=== Football ===
The city is home to Auto Esporte, CSP and Botafogo.

=== American football ===
João Pessoa Espectros: This football team is regarded as the best football team in the northeastern region of Brazil, having earned a national title, seven regional titles and three state titles.

=== Kayaking ===
Bessa Beach offers kayaking, popular among tourists, to reach four kilometers (2.5 mi) of coral and marine life in the blue sea of the "Caribessa".

=== Surfing ===
The Paraíba nurtures great surfers, with athletes winning in many nationally prominent contests in the sport.

=== Diving ===
The coastline of João Pessoa includes the Alvarenga shipwreck, an artificial reef for developing marine life.

- Alvarenga Shipwreck : The Alvarenga was a vessel used to transport supplies to ships. It wrecked about 9.6 km from the tip of Bessa's Beach and is submerged 20 metres (66 ft) deep. It remains whole, 20 m (66 ft) in length by 5 m (16 ft) in beam. It is possible for divers to penetrate the small bow and stern compartments safely. On the prow the winch to hoist the anchor remains in view. It is also common to find large stingrays and shoals of fish, such as the top cock and the hook.

== Sister cities ==
- Hartford, Connecticut, United States.
- Pompano Beach, Florida, United States.

== Notable people ==
- Kaio de Almeida, Brazilian swimmer
- Zé Marco, beach volleyball player
- Matheus Cunha, Brazilian football player
- Ariano Fernandes, politician
- Douglas Santos, Brazilian football player
- Álvaro, Brazilian beach volleyball player
- João Batista, Brazilian sprinter.
