= Ariano =

Ariano may refer to:

== Places ==
- Ariano Irpino, Campania, Italy
  - Ariano di Puglia until 1930
- Ariano nel Polesine, Veneto, Italy
- Ariano Ferrarese, Mesola, Emilia-Romagna, Italy
- Ariano, Olevano sul Tusciano, Campania, Italy

== People ==
- Ariano Fernandes (born 1963), Brazilian politician
- Ariano Suassuna (1927–2014), Brazilian playwright
- Azmahar Ariano (born 1991), Panamanian footballer

== See also ==
- Assizes of Ariano, a 12th-century constitution for the Kingdom of Sicily
