= Cabo Branco Lighthouse =

Lighthouse in Paraíba, Brazil

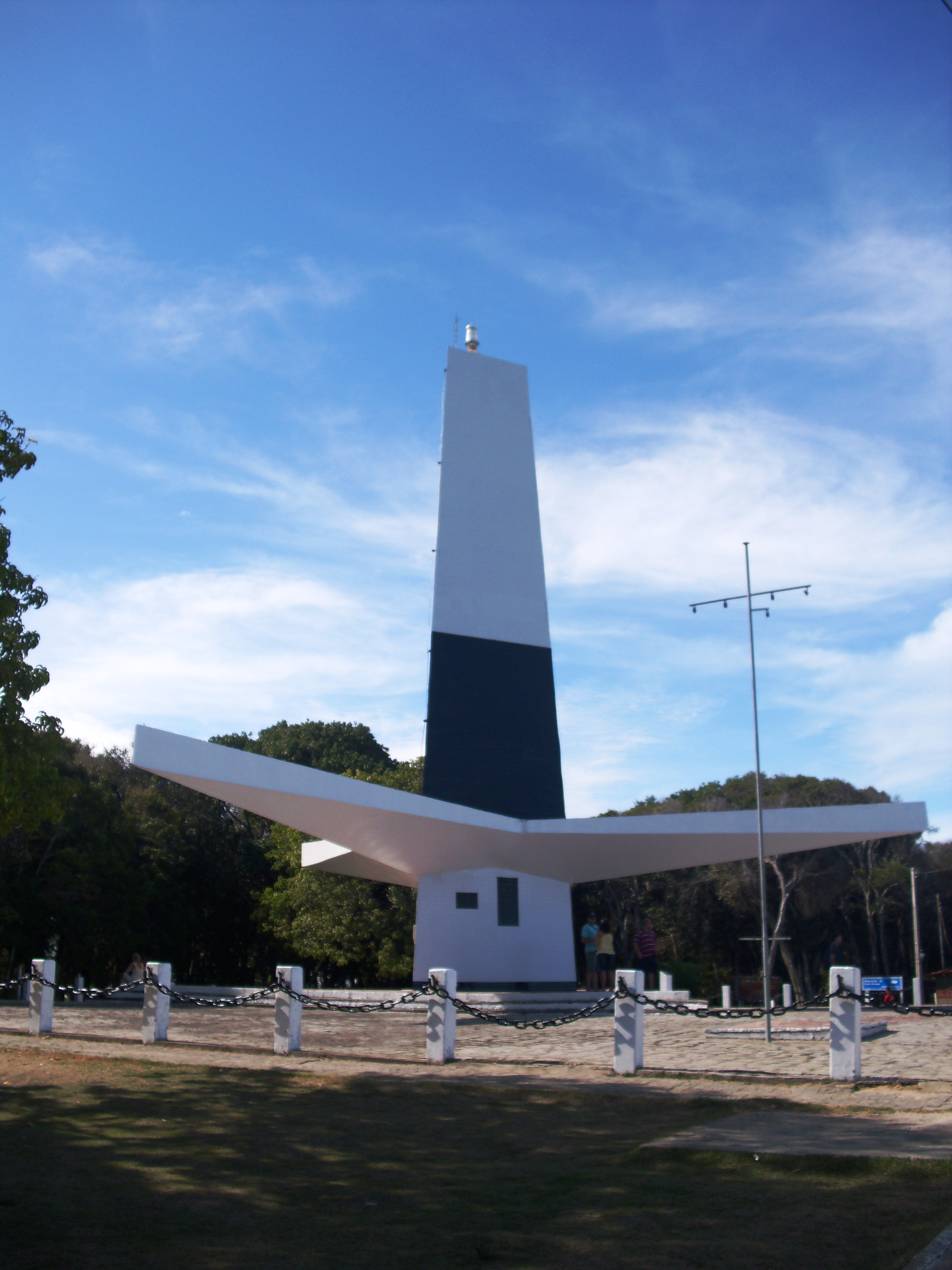
- Cabo Branco Farol located in Ponta dos Seixas João Pessoa, Paraíba, Brazil
- Location: João Pessoa; Paraíba; Brazil
- Coordinates: 7°08′55″S 34°47′48″W

Tower
- Constructed: 1972
- Construction: concrete tower
- Height: 18 metres (59 ft)
- Shape: triangular tower with three wings and no lantern
- Markings: white tower with horizontal black band above the wings
- Heritage: asset of historic and or cultural interest

Light
- First lit: 1972
- Focal height: 45 metres (148 ft)
- Range: 27 nmi (50 km; 31 mi)
- Characteristic: LFl W 10s
- Brazil no.: BR-1256

The Cabo Branco Lighthouse is located on the cliffs of Cabo Branco, in the neighborhood of the same name, in João Pessoa, Paraíba, Brazil. Situated-approximately 800 metres (2,600 ft) to the north of Ponta do Seixas, easternmost point of the entire Americas. It is one of the most important and visited places in João Pessoa.

== History ==
A concrete triangular tower, with three projections pointed in a wing shape 3.5 metres (11 ft) above the floor. The tower is painted white with a horizontal black strip immediately above the wings. It is not a true lighthouse as it lacks a light, but rather a type of navigation marker.

The tower was inaugurated in April 1972, during the government of Emílio Médici. The beacon of "Cape White" has a triangular shape with wings, the only one like it in the world. The architects had the intention to represent a sisal plant in the design of the lighthouse. Sisal has been one of the most lasting economic mainstays in the state of Paraiba.

== See also ==
- List of lighthouses in Brazil
