= Ponta do Seixas =

Easternmost point of the American continent

Coordinates: 7°8′55.41″S 34°47′48.82″W

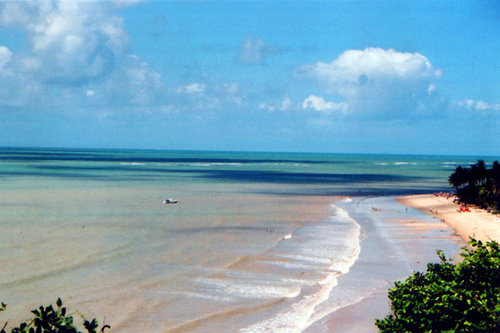
Ponta dos Seixas, from the perspective of the tip of Cabo Branco Beach.

Ponta do Seixas (Portuguese pronunciation: [ˈpõtɐ du ˈsejʃɐs]), is a beach on the Atlantic coast of Paraíba state, northeastern Brazil, that forms the easternmost point of the American double-continent, roughly 8 km (5 mi) southeast of João Pessoa, the state capital.

The name Ponta do Seixas simply means Point of Seixas or Tip of Seixas, Seixas being the surname of the landowner.

== Geography ==
It is surrounded by white sand beaches bordered by flat-topped forms of sedimentary strata called "tabuleiros", which rise sharply above the beaches to heights between 150 and 500 ft, and enjoys abundant rainfall. It lies on the coastal highway connecting João Pessoa and the port of Cabedelo farther north. Pontas dos Seixas is often confused with Cabo Branco, especially by foreigners, but these two are different official neighborhoods and separate beaches.

== Cabo Branco Lighthouse ==
Opened in 1972, the Cabo Branco Lighthouse is one of the most visited postcards of the city. It is very close to Cabo Branco Station. The Cabo Branco Lighthouse has a unique triangular shape. From the Lighthouse, visitors can view a large part of the coastline of João Pessoa.

== Gallery ==
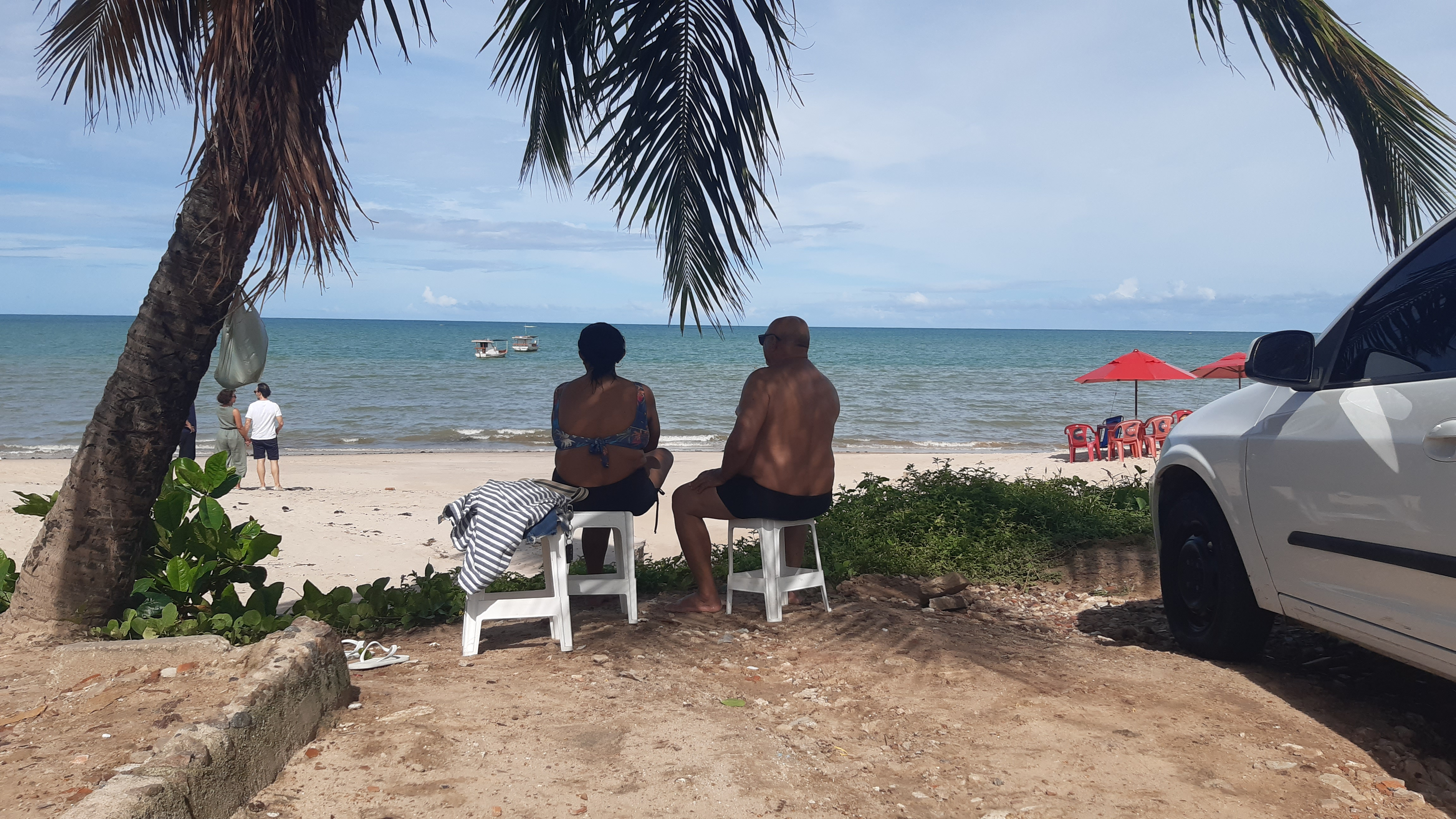
The beach

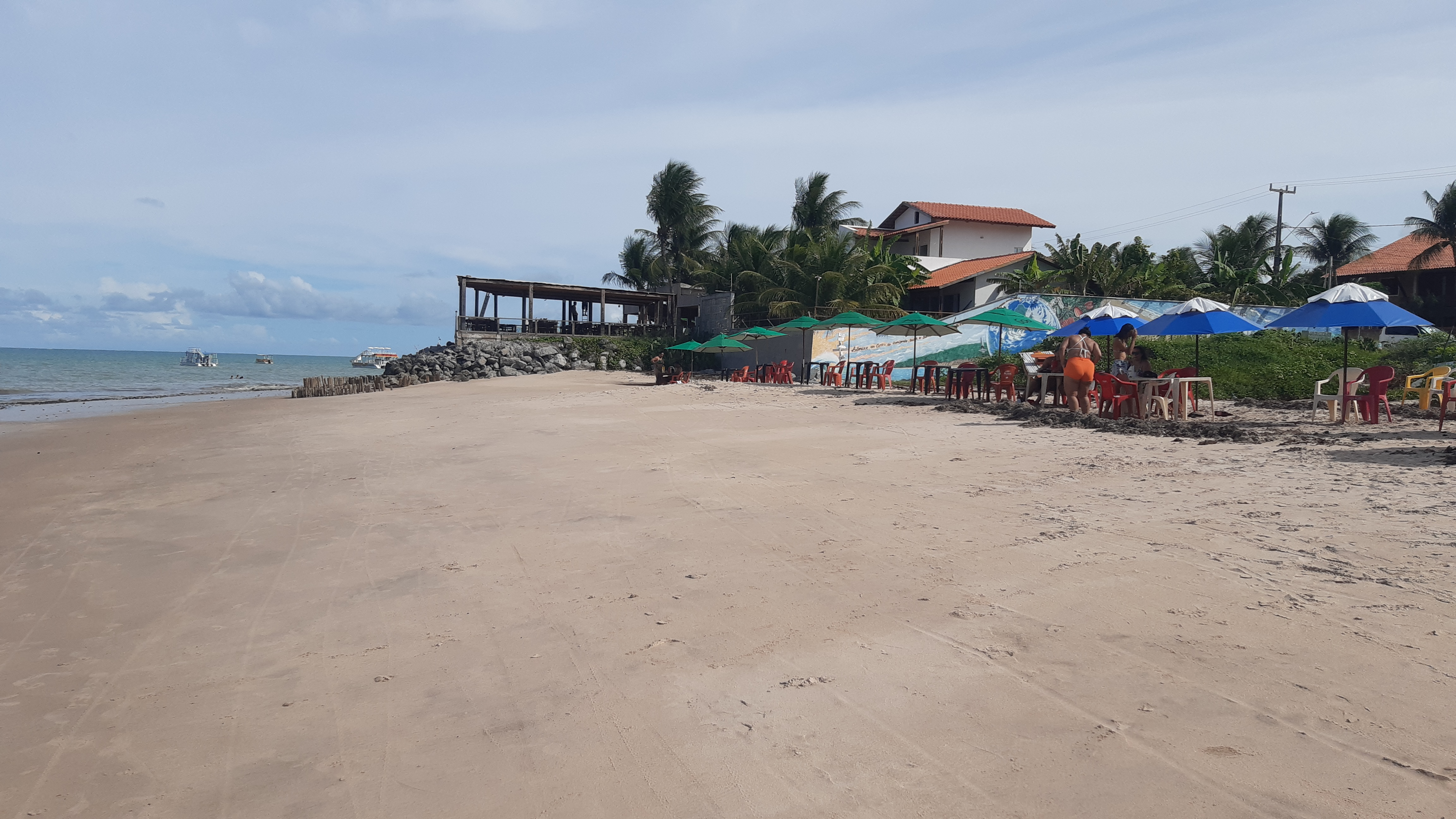
Looking south

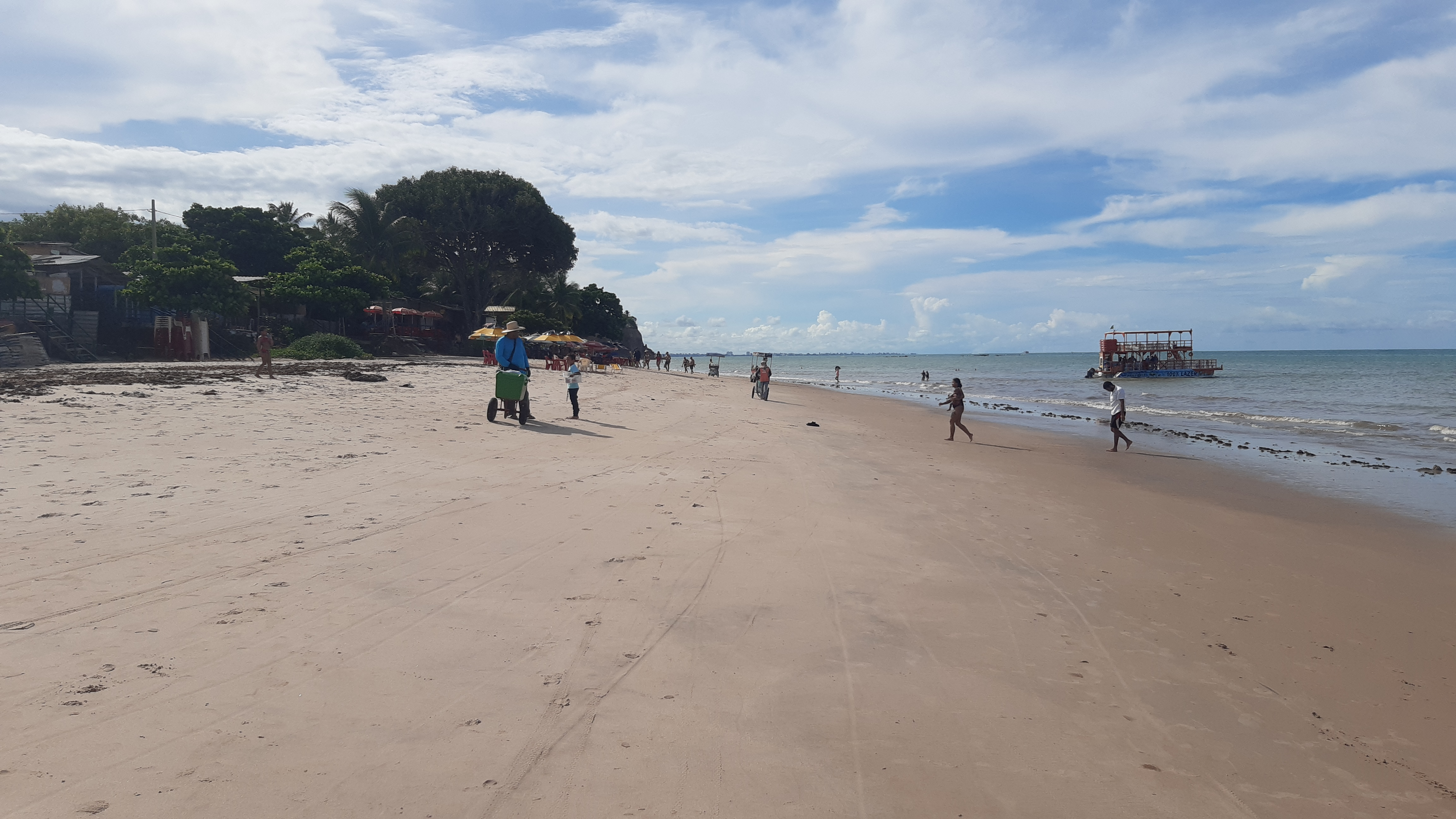
Looking north

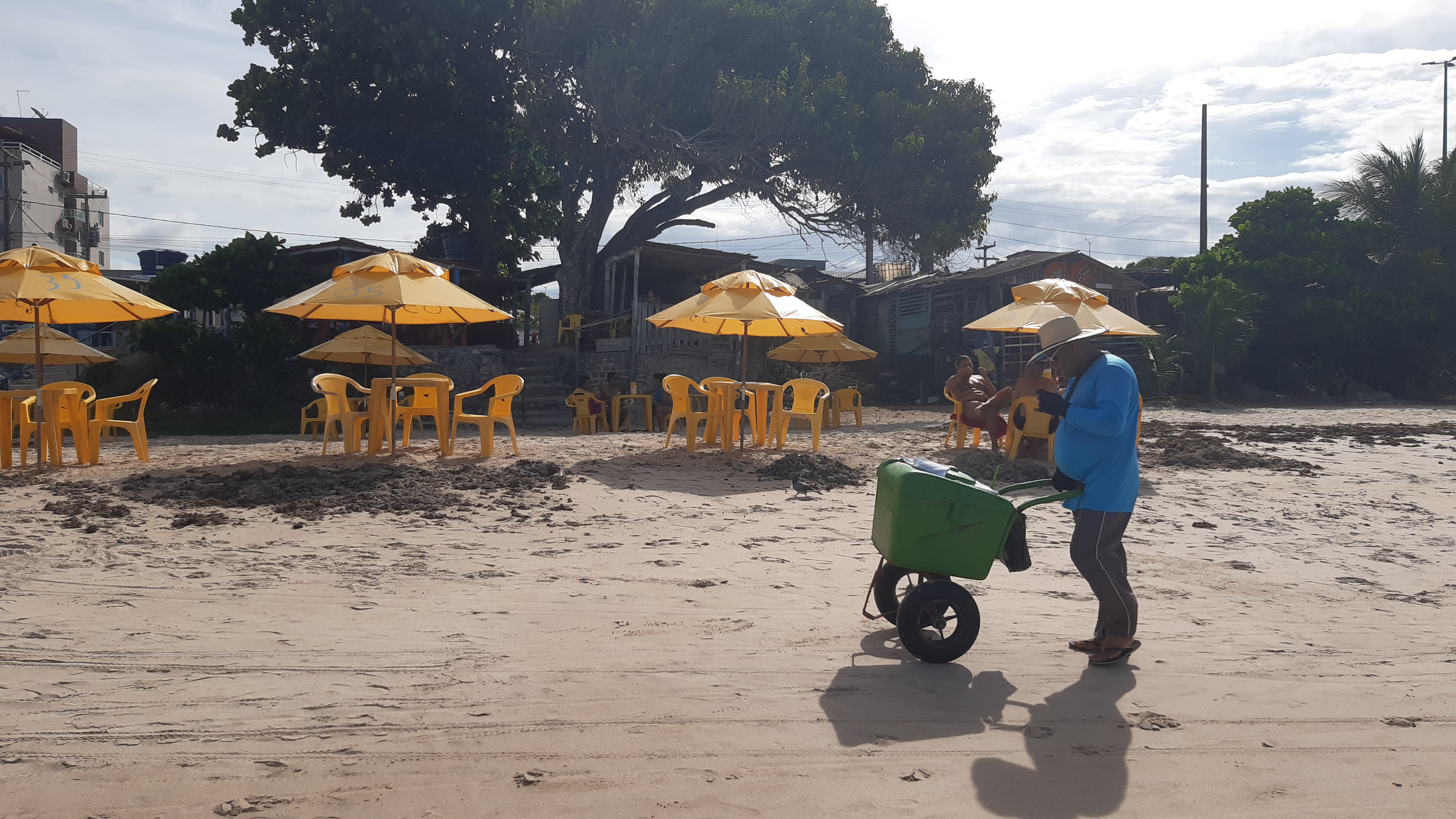
Ice cream seller on the beach
