= Saturnino de Brito =

Brazilian sanitation engineer

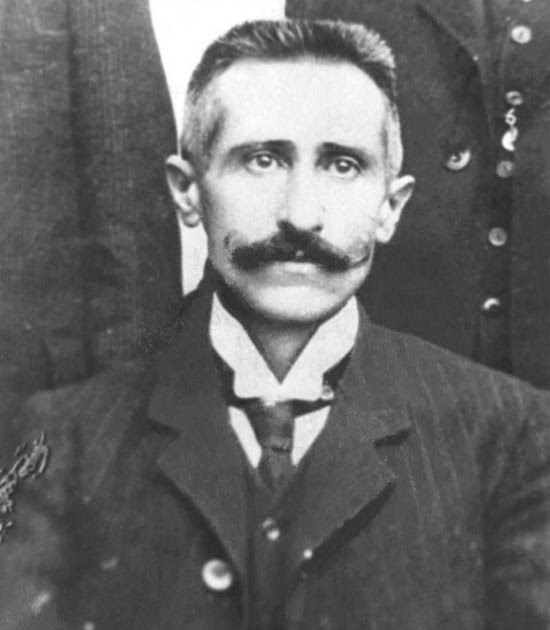
- Born: Francisco Saturnino Rodrigues de Brito; 14 July 1864; Campos de Goytacazes, Province of Rio de Janeiro, Empire of Brazil
- Died: 10 March 1929 (aged 64); Pelotas, Rio Grande do Sul, Brazil
- Education: Federal University of Rio de Janeiro
- Occupation: Sanitary engineer

Francisco Rodrigues Saturnino de Brito (1864 in Campos dos Goytacazes, Rio de Janeiro — 1929 in Pelotas, Rio Grande do Sul) is considered the pioneer of sanitary engineering and environmental engineering in Brazil. He was a hydraulics and sanitation engineer and professor at Federal University of Rio de Janeiro. He lived in Rio de Janeiro. His son Francisco Saturnino de Brito Filho had continued his important works.
