= Ariano Fernandes =

Brazilian lawyer and politician

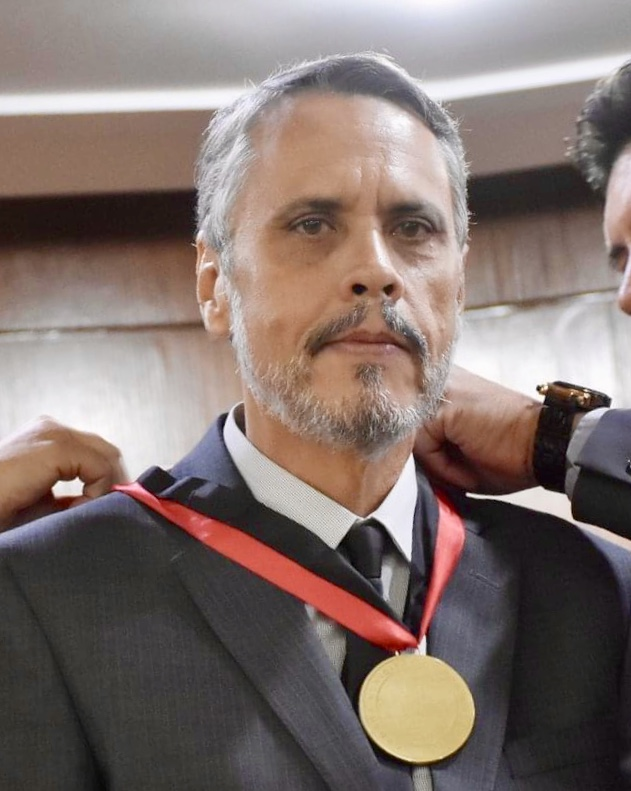
- Ariano Fernandes

State Representative of Paraíba
- In office February 1, 1995 – November 20, 2008

Personal details
- Born: April 28, 1963 (age 63) João Pessoa, Paraíba, Brazil

Ariano Mário Fernandes Fonsêca (João Pessoa, April 28, 1963) is a Brazilian lawyer and politician, affiliated to the Brazilian Democratic Movement (MDB). He is great-nephew of the former governor of Paraíba José Fernandes de Lima. In his career was four times State Representative.

Ariano is also the founder of Radio Potiguara, the first radio in Mamanguape and member of the Paraíba State Federation of Industries (FIEP).
