= Diocese of Campina Grande =

Catholic ecclesiastical territory

Coordinates: 7.2186°S 35.8812°W

Diocese of Campina Grande Dioecesis Campinae Grandis

Catholic
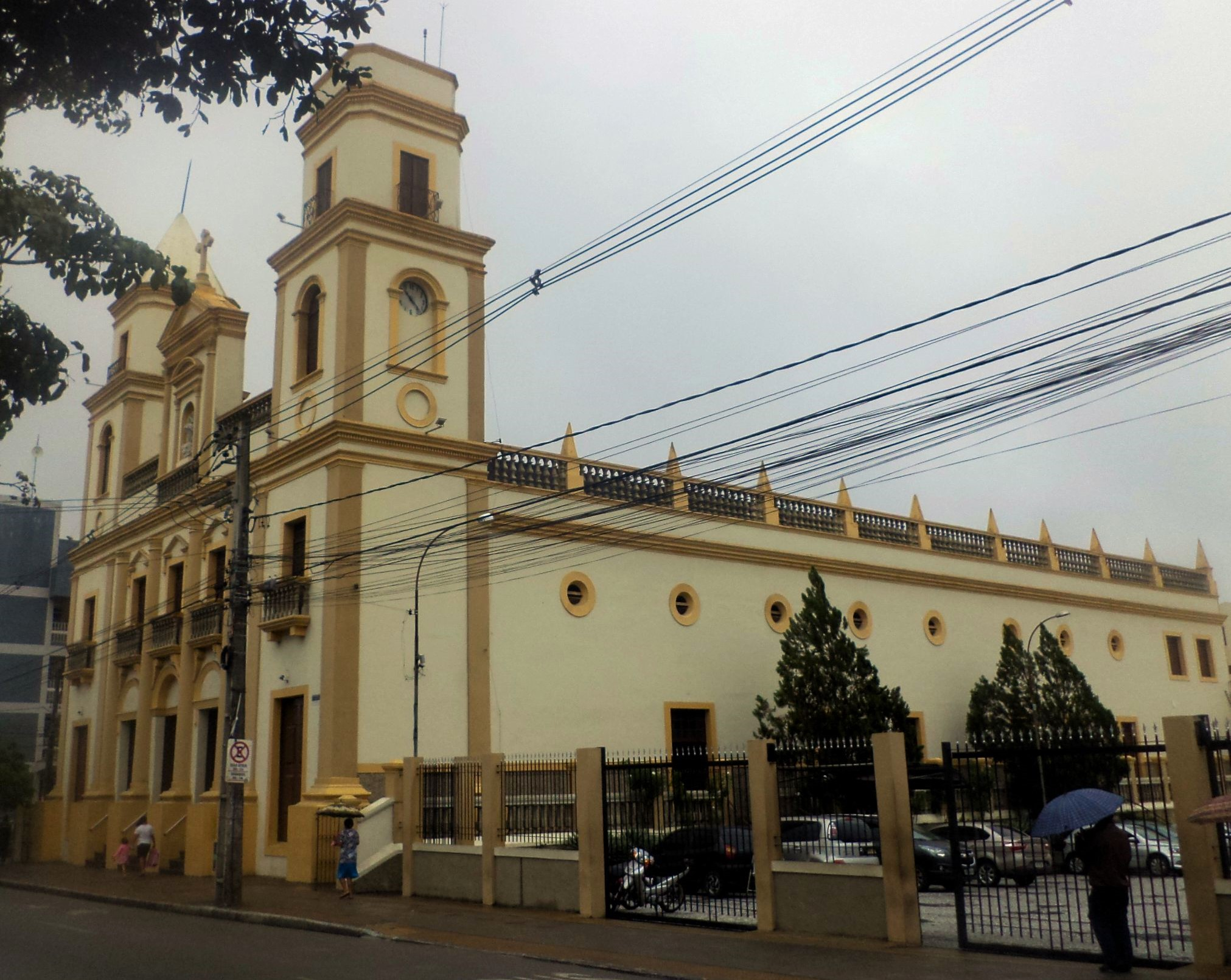
- Catedral Nossa Senhora da Conceição in 2017

Location
- Country: Brazil
- Ecclesiastical province: Paraíba

Statistics
- Area: 20,451 km^{2} (7,896 sq mi)
- Population: Total; Catholics: (as of 2003); 830,118; 720,000 (86.7%)

Information
- Rite: Latin Rite
- Established: 14 May 1949 (77 years ago)
- Cathedral: Catedral Nossa Senhora da Conceição

Current leadership
- Pope: Leo XIV
- Bishop: Dulcênio Fontes de Matos
- Metropolitan Archbishop: Manoel Delson Pedreira da Cruz, O.F.M.Cap.

Website
- www.diocesedecampinagrande.org

The Roman Catholic Diocese of Campina Grande (Latin: Dioecesis Campinae Grandis) is a suffragan Latin diocese in the ecclesiastical province of Paraíba, in northeastern Brazil.

Its cathedral episcopal see is Catedral Nossa Senhora da Conceição, dedicated to the Immaculate Conception, in the city of Campina Grande.

It is vacant.

== History ==
Established on May 14, 1949, as the Diocese of Campina Grande, on territory split off from the Archdiocese of Paraíba, its Metropolitan since. It lost territory on January 17, 1959, to establish the Diocese of Patos.

== Statistics ==
As of 2014, it pastorally serves 807,000 Catholics (87.0% of 928,000 total) in 20,051 km^{2} (7,742 sq mi) in 52 parishes with 92 priests (69 diocesan, 23 religious), 1 deacon, 131 lay religious (67 brothers, 64 sisters) and 25 seminarians.

== Bishops ==
(all Latin Rite)

=== Episcopal ordinaries ===
Suffragan Bishops of Campina Grande

- Anselmo Pietrulla, Order of Friars Minor (O.F.M.) (born Poland) (June 18, 1949 – May 11, 1955), next Bishop of Tubarão (Brazil) (May 11, 1955 – retired September 17, 1981), died 1992; previously Apostolic Administrator of then Territorial Prelature of Santarem (Brazil, now a diocese) (1941 – December 13, 1947), Titular Bishop of Conana (December 13, 1947 – June 18, 1949) as Bishop-Prelate of above Santarém (December 13, 1947 – June 18, 1949), Apostolic Administrator of Territorial Prelature of Macapá (Brazil) (1949 – January 14, 1950)
- Otàvio Barbosa Aguiar (February 24, 1956 – July 4, 1962) (first Brazilian incumbent), next Bishop of Palmeira dos Índios (Brazil) (July 4, 1962 – retired March 29, 1978), died 2004; previously Titular Bishop of Gergis (November 6, 1954 – February 24, 1956) as Auxiliary Bishop of Archdiocese of São Luís do Maranhão (Brazil) (November 6, 1954 – February 24, 1956)
- Manuel Pereira da Costa (August 23, 1962 – retired May 20, 1981), died 2006; previously Titular Bishop of Knin (May 31, 1954 – June 20, 1959) as Auxiliary Bishop of Archdiocese of Paraíba (Brazil) (May 31, 1954 – June 20, 1959), Bishop of Nazaré (Brazil) (June 20, 1959 – August 23, 1962)
- Luís Gonzaga Fernandes (July 9, 1981 – August 29, 2001), died 2003; previously Titular Bishop of Mididi (November 6, 1965 – July 9, 1981) as Auxiliary Bishop of Archdiocese of Vitória (Brazil) (November 6, 1965 – July 9, 1981)
- Matias Patrício de Macêdo (August 29, 2001 – November 26, 2003), next Metropolitan Archbishop of Natal (Brazil) (November 26, 2003 – December 21, 2011); previously Bishop of Cajazeiras (Brazil) (July 12, 1990 – July 12, 2000), Coadjutor Bishop of Campina Grande (Brazil) (July 12, 2000 – succession August 29, 2001)
- Jaime Vieira Rocha (February 16, 2005 – December 21, 2011); previously Bishop of Caicó (Brazil) (November 29, 1995 – February 16, 2005); next Metropolitan Archbishop of Natal (Brazil) (December 21, 2011 – ...)
- Manoel Delson Pedreira da Cruz, Order of Friars Minor Capuchin (O.F.M.Cap.) (August 8, 2012 – March 8, 2017), next Metropolitan Archbishop of Paraíba (Brazil) (March 8, 2017 – ...); formerly Bishop of Caicó (Brazil) (July 5, 2006 – August 8, 2012)
- Dulcênio Fontes de Matos (October 11, 2017 – present); previously Titular Bishop of Cozyla as Auxiliary Bishop of Aracajú (in Sergipe) (April 18, 2001 – July 12, 2006), Bishop of Palmeira dos Índios (in Alagoas) (July 12, 2006 – October 11, 2017)

=== Coadjutor bishop ===
- Matias Patrício de Macêdo (2001–2003)

=== Other priests of this diocese who became bishop ===
- Genival Saraiva de França, appointed Bishop of Palmares, Pernambuco in 2000

== See also ==
- List of Catholic dioceses in Brazil

== Sources and external links ==
- GCatholic.org, with Google map and satellite photo - data for all sections
- Catholic Hierarchy
