= Church of Saint Peter Gonzalez =

Catholic church in João Pessoa, Brazil

Saint Peter González Church
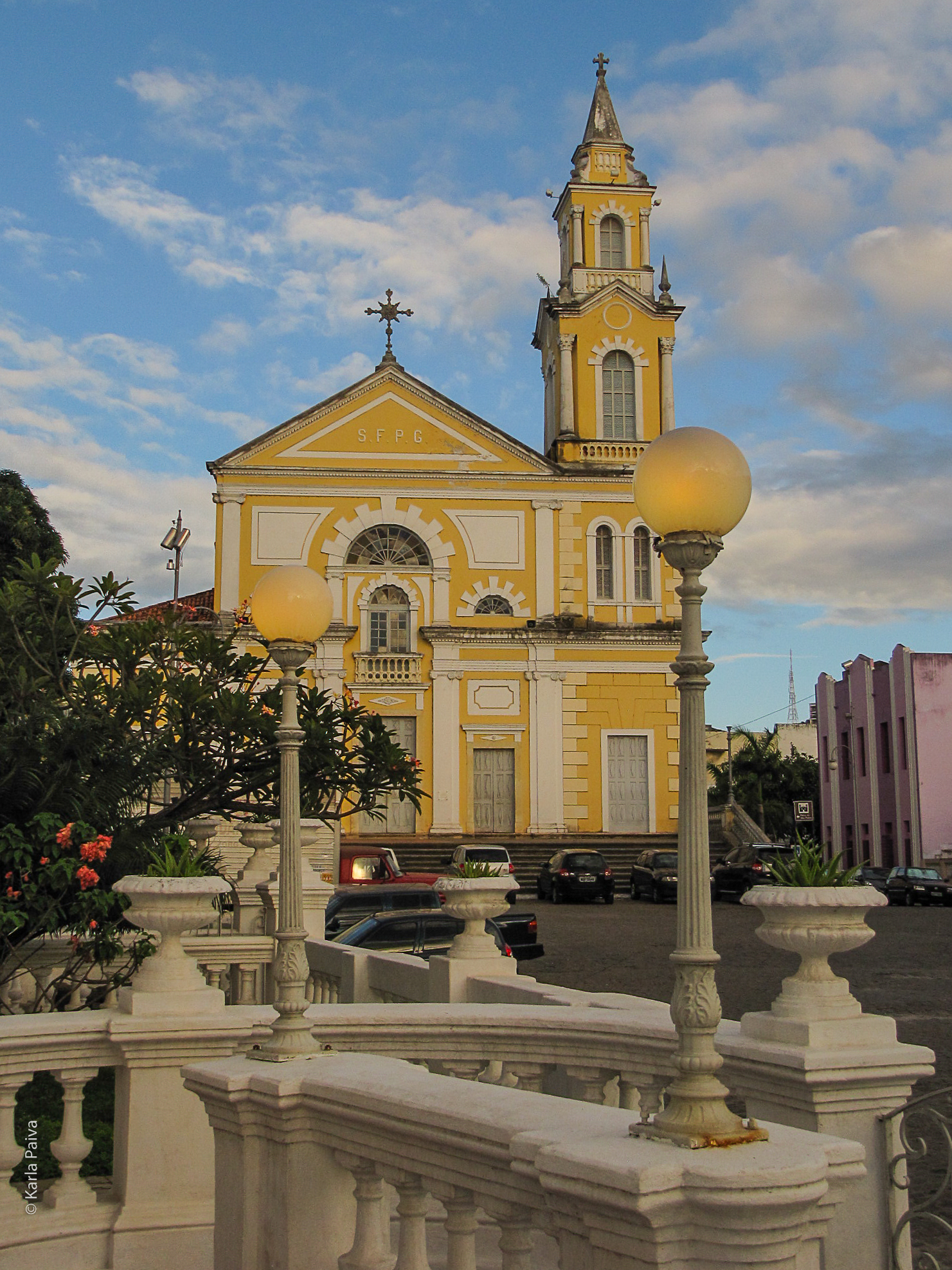
- view of the Saint Peter Gonzalez Church

Religion
- Affiliation: Roman Catholic Church
- Sect: Dominican Order
- Diocese: Archdiocese of Paraíba
- Province: Archdiocese of Paraíba
- Ecclesiastical or organisational status: Church
- Patron: Peter González

Location
- Location: João Pessoa, Paraíba, Brazil
- Interactive map of Saint Peter González Church
- Coordinates: 7.1154°S 34.8844°W

Architecture
- Style: neoclassical architecture
- Completed: 1843

Saint Peter Gonzalez Church (Portuguese: Igreja de São Frei Pedro Gonçalves) is a Catholic church located at Largo de São Frei Pedro Gonçalves (which includes the church, houses and Hotel Globo). It is on top of the hill of the old Porto do Varadouro, in front of the Sanhauá River in the historic center of João Pessoa, capital of the Brazilian state of Paraíba. It stands out for its eclectic architecture with Neoclassical influences.

== History ==
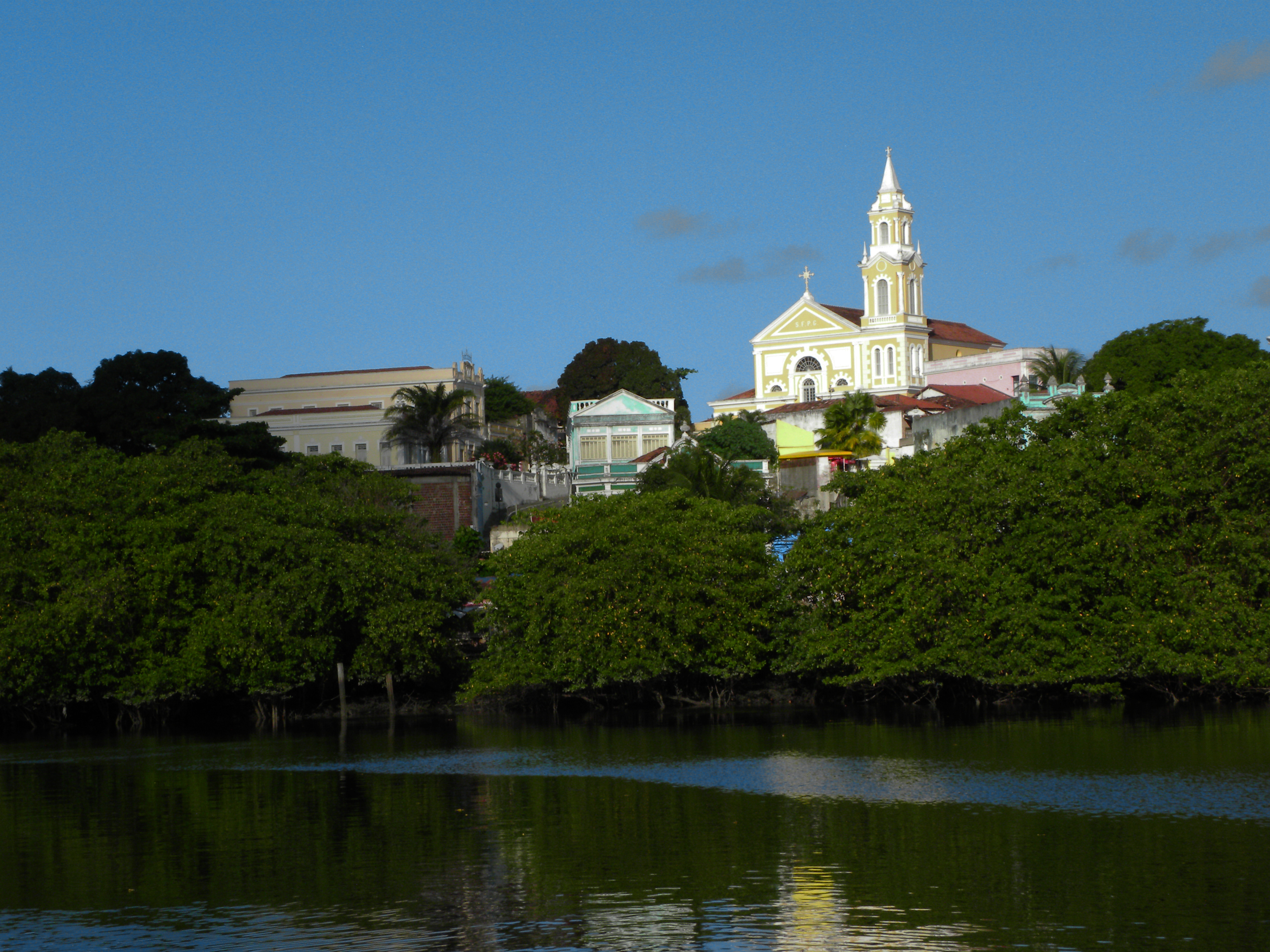
View of the Saint Peter Gonzalez Church from the Sanhauá River

The church was built in 1843 with the contributions of merchants and fishermen, who settled on Rua Direita (Rua Duque de Caxias). The church initially bore the name of Church of the Navegantes; later, it was renamed for Saint Peter González, who is the Spanish patron saint of navigators.

== Archaeological Discovery ==
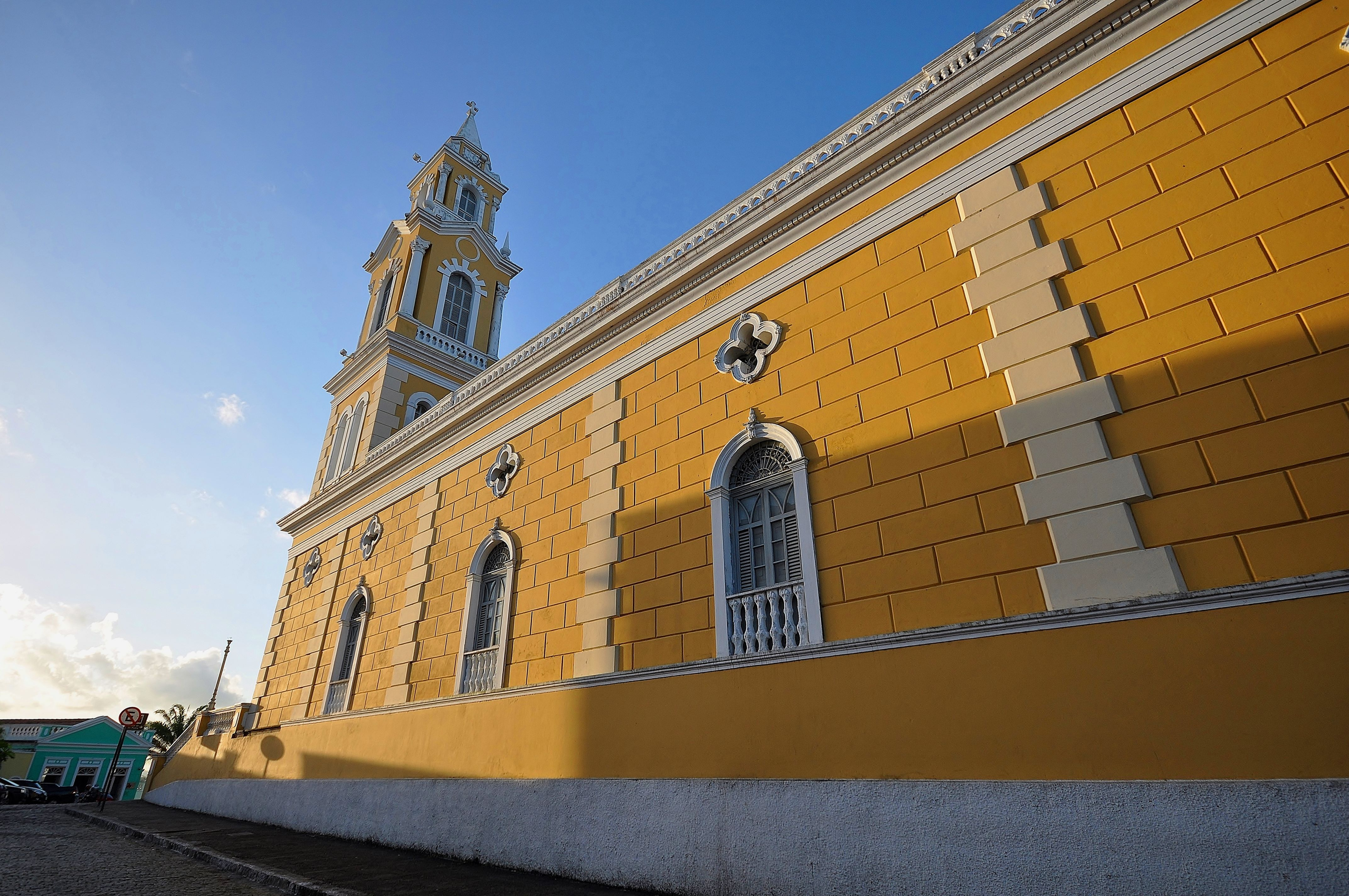
Side view of St. Peter González Church

During the restoration of the church in 2000, technicians (historians, archaeologists and architects) identified the ruins of a fortification built at the end of the 16th century. In a preliminary assessment by Brazilian National Institute of Historic and Artistic Heritage (IPHAN) technicians, they may be the walls of a fortress, possibly the Fort of Varadouro. During excavation, the water source that archaeologists believe to have supplied the population was also found, as well as tunnels for water drainage, human bones and ceramic material. This may be related to the first settlements of the then Captaincy of Paraíba, of 1585.

== See also ==
- Church of Mercy
- Church and Convent of Our Lady of the Rosary
- Monastery of St. Benedict
- Cathedral Basilica of Our Lady of the Snows
- São Francisco Cultural Center
