= Church of Our Lady of Mercy (João Pessoa) =

Church in Paraíba, Brazil

Our Lady of Mercy Church
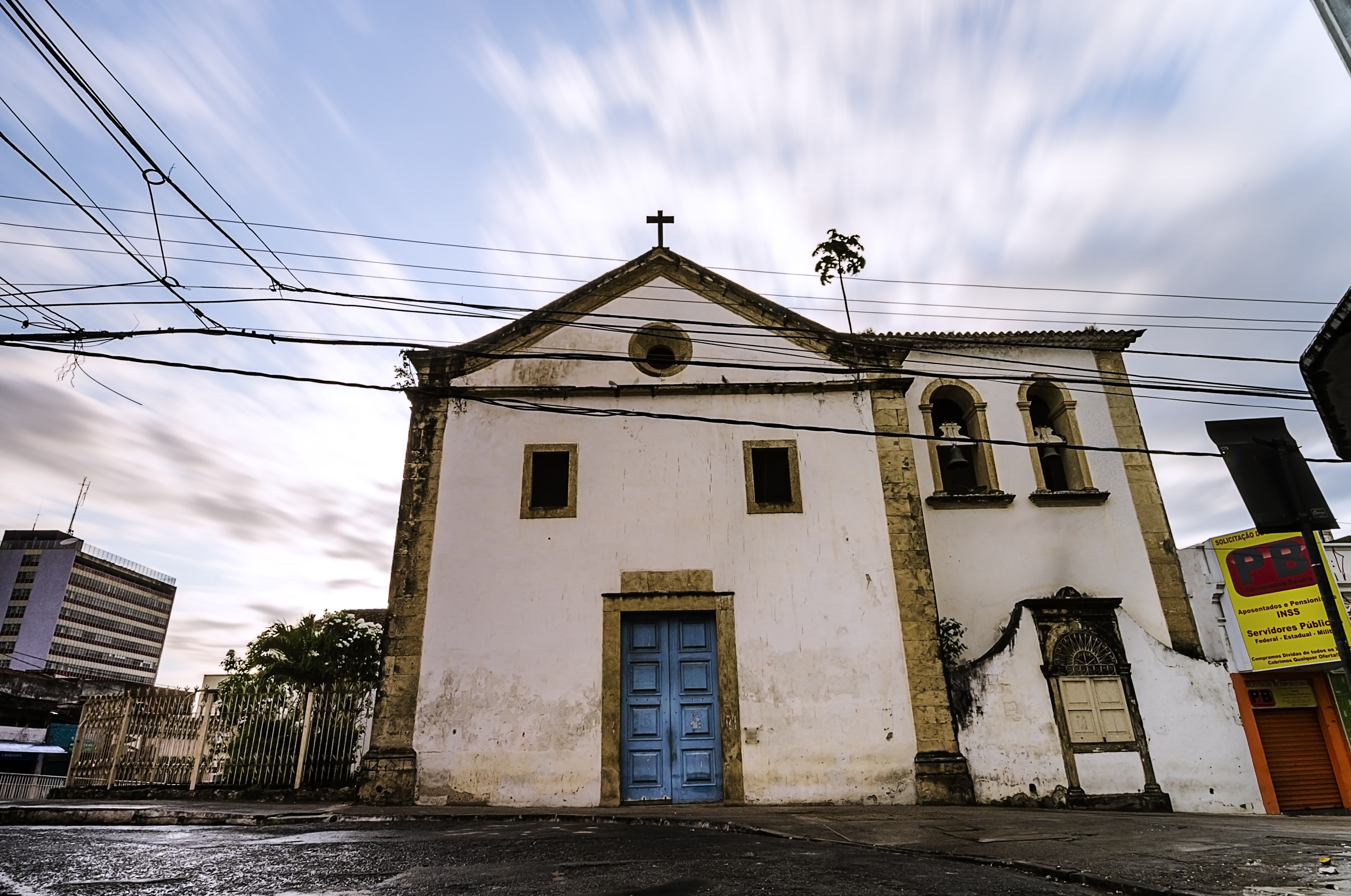
- View of the Our Lady of Mercy Church

Religion
- Affiliation: Roman Catholic Church
- Sect: Our Lady of Mercy
- Diocese: Archdiocese of Paraíba
- Province: Archdiocese of Paraíba
- Ecclesiastical or organizational status: Church and Holy House of Mercy.
- Patron: Our Lady of Mercy

Location
- Location: João Pessoa, Paraíba, Brazil
- Interactive map of Our Lady of Mercy Church
- Coordinates: 7.1154°S 34.8844°W

Architecture
- Style: Mannerist architecture and baroque architecture.
- Completed: 1589-1612

National Historic Heritage of Brazil
- Designated: 1938
- Reference no.: 41

Our Lady of Mercy Church is a Catholic church located in the Historic Center of João Pessoa, capital of the Brazilian state of Paraíba.

The Church of the Holy House of Mercy, considered the first church of Paraíba. It was built under a primitive chapel built by Duarte Gomes da Silveira and represents a very important monument within the framework of the heritage historical-artistic Paraíba. The façade shows the features Mannerist architecture, without the ornaments and ostentations of baroque architecture. The Church of Mercy is owned by the Holy House of Mercy.

== Story ==
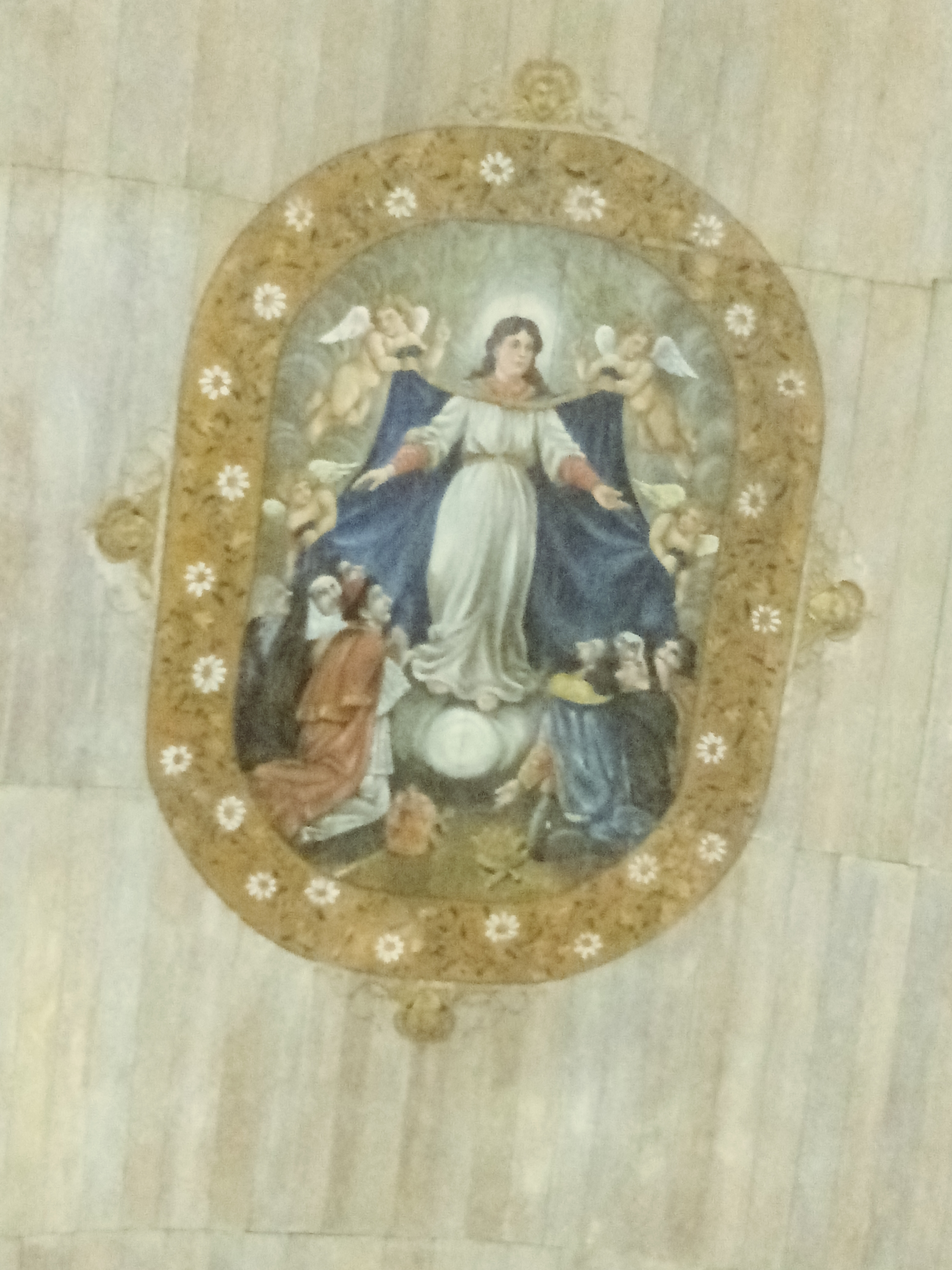
Historical painting on the Ceiling of the Church of Mercy in João Pessoa

According to the record, it was the first church of Paraíba, Duarte Gomes da Silveira having instituted the purple of San Salvador del Mundo around 1639. The church is in the mannerist and baroque style, marked by the presence of the pulpit and the choir. it possesses the tabernacle with its golden reliefs carved of wood. The arch that separates the presbytery from the rest of the church, shows the emblem of the corners of the old Portuguese crown, and the Chapel of the Savior of the World, another emblem similar to the Spanish coins of the time of Felipe II. The church was recognized and inscribed as a historical heritage by IPHAN on April 25, 1938. The church assumed the role of parent sometimes, following the example of the Dutch Invasion period (1635) and when the Mother Church went through reforms or needed repairs, marking several moments of the religious and cultural reality of the capital of Paraiba. The Church of Mercy is owned by the Holy House of Mercy.

== Historic Architecture ==
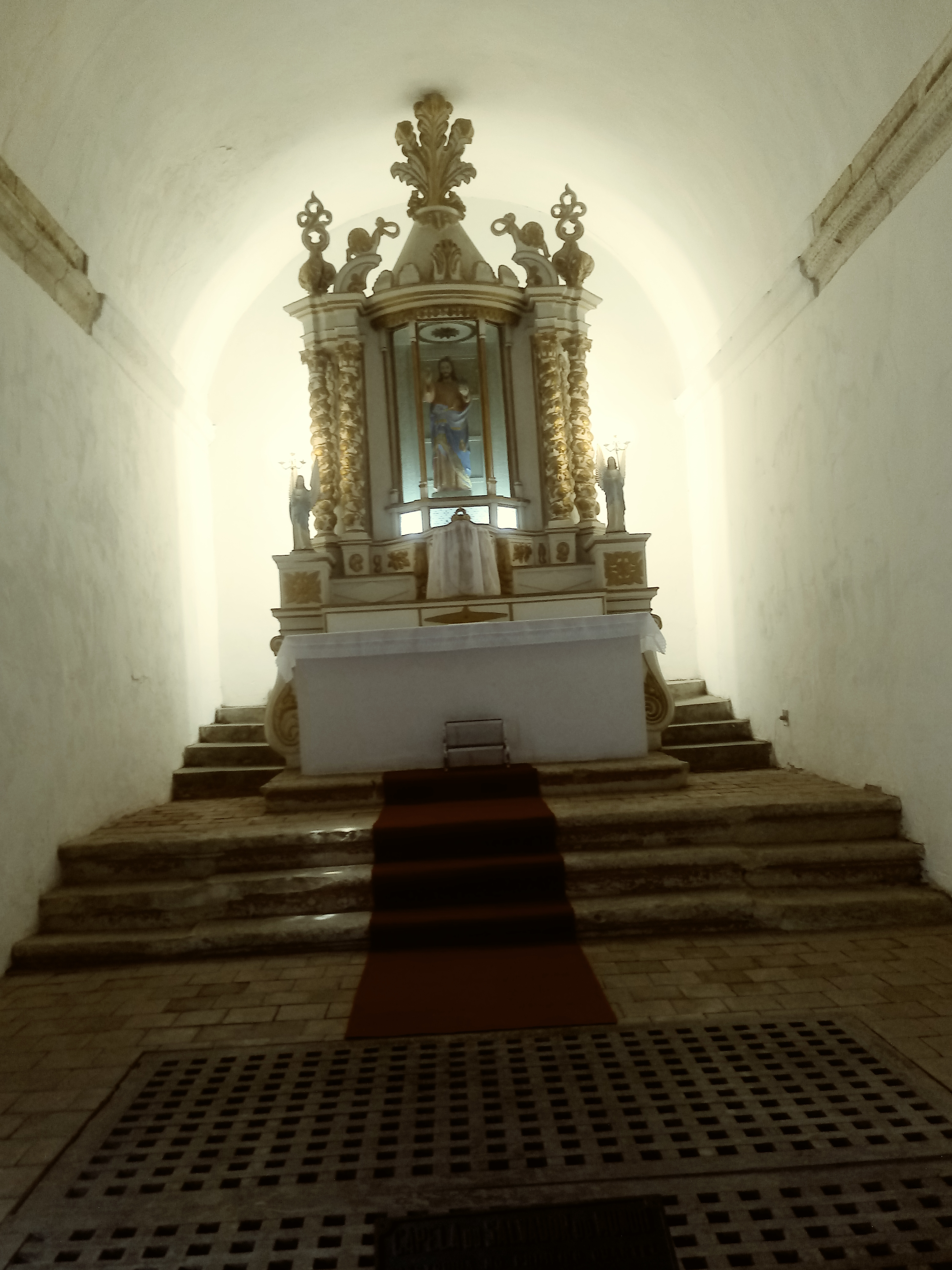
Chapel of the Savior of the World in the Church of Mercy

It is characterized by the volumetric simplicity of the facade and a certain constructive rusticity. It has ground floor in single shallow ship, of proportions that tend to double squared, being this the initial part of the construction dating from the sixteenth century. It has major chapel, side chapel (Savior of the World), side altars and lateral gallery.

The main facade has a Portuguese style floor. In this façade, in turn, there is a central body that imposes, of greater height, and is topped by a smooth triangular pediment, crowned by a cross. At the height of the lining, it has two small windows and above an eyepiece. On the left, a straight belfry has two windows with a full arch and a roof of four waters.

In the same alignment of the facade is the wheel of the exposed with a work in stonework. The side of the chapel of the Savior of the World stands out in the main facade, in a backward position, with a door in two leaves, a straight and altered cock.

== Holy House of Mercy of Paraíba ==
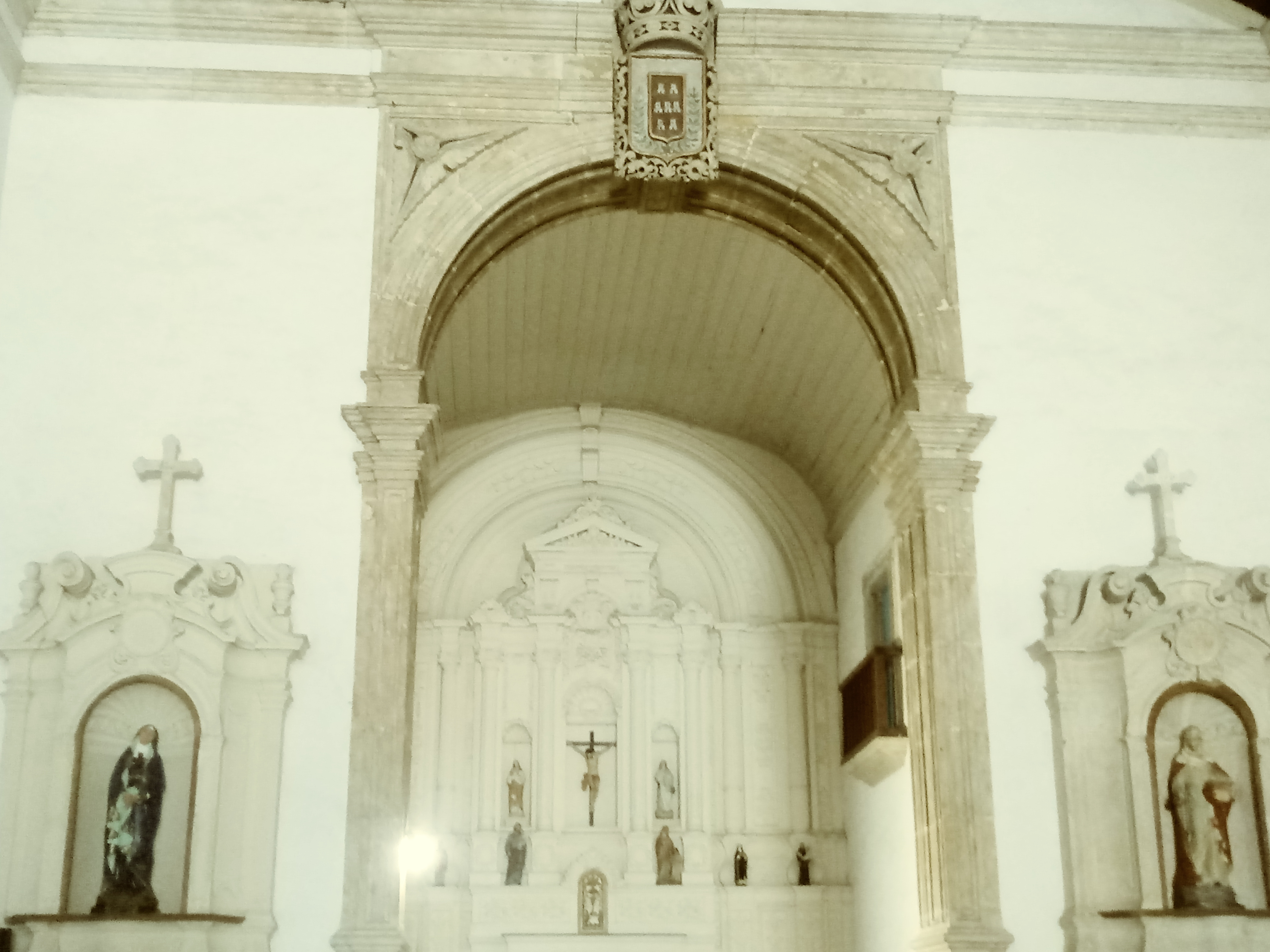
Altar of the Church of Mercy

The Church of Mercy is owned by the Holy House of Mercy. Knowing this, the Holy House of Mercy in João Pessoa exercised its functions not only to religious offices but also to care for the sick, with children, with prisoners and for the entombment of slaves and condemned to dead. The property underwent a restoration promoted by the workshop-school of João Pessoa in association with the bilateral cooperative Brazil - Spain and the Revitalization Project of the Historic Center of João Pessoa.

== See also ==
- Church and Convent of Our Lady of the Rosary
- Monastery of St. Benedict
- Cathedral Basilica of Our Lady of the Snows
- Church of Saint Peter Gonzalez
- São Francisco Cultural Center
