= Diocese of Patos =

Catholic ecclesiastical territory

Diocese of Patos Dioecesis Patosensis

Catholic
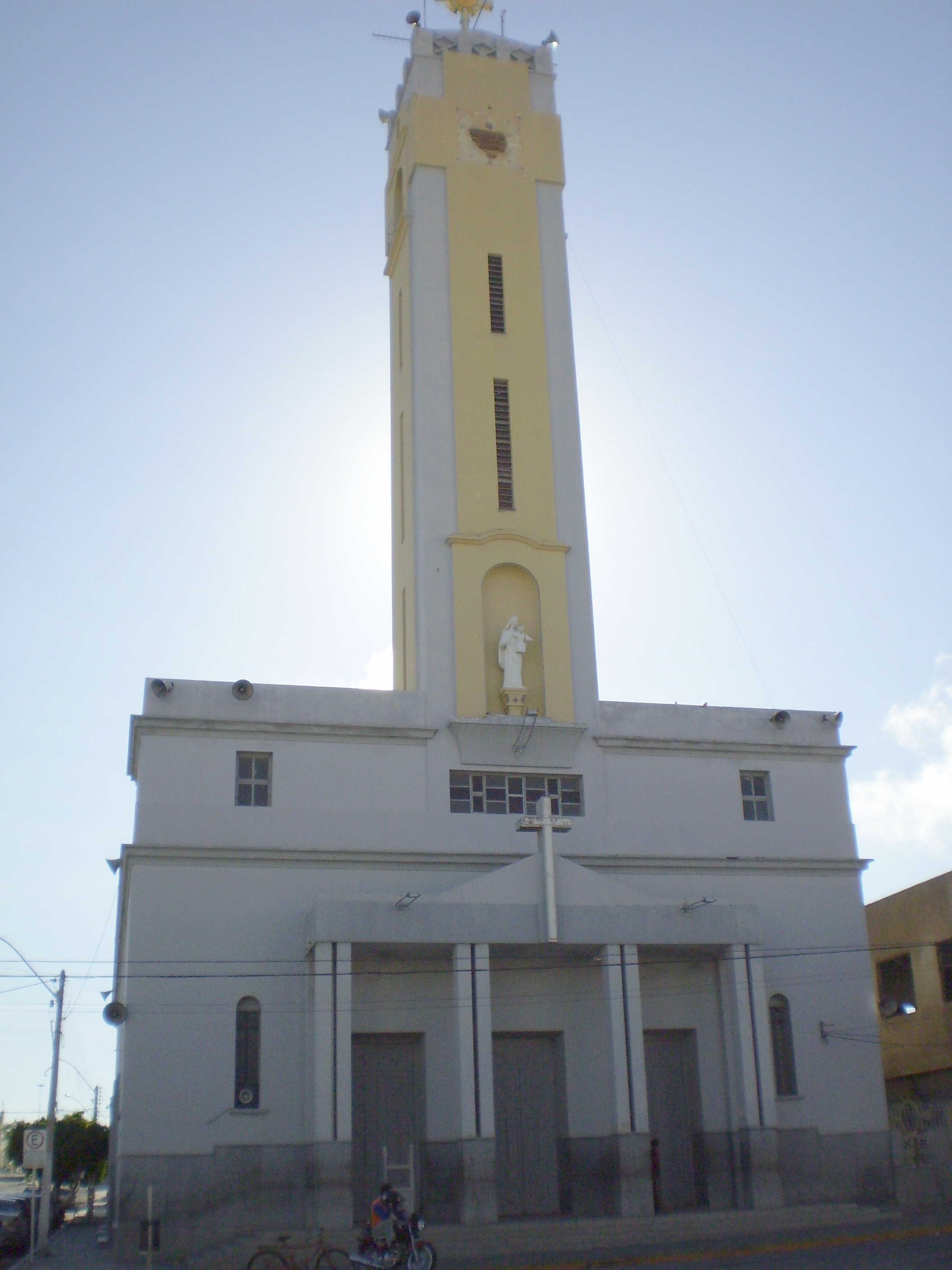
- Catedral Nossa Senhora da Guia (2012)

Location
- Country: Brazil
- Ecclesiastical province: Paraíba

Statistics
- Area: 11,000 km^{2} (4,200 sq mi)
- Population: Total; Catholics: (as of 2004); 365,000; 337,600 (92.5%)

Information
- Rite: Latin Rite
- Established: 17 January 1959 (67 years ago)
- Cathedral: Catedral Nossa Senhora da Guia

Current leadership
- Pope: Leo XIV
- Bishop: Eraldo Bispo da Silva
- Metropolitan Archbishop: Manoel Delson Pedreira da Cruz, O.F.M. Cap.

Website
- www.diocesedepatospb.org.br

The Roman Catholic Diocese of Patos (Latin: Dioecesis Patosensis) is a diocese located in the city of Patos in the ecclesiastical province of Paraíba in Brazil.

== History ==
- January 17, 1959: Established as Diocese of Patos from the Diocese of Cajazeiras and Diocese of Campina Grande

== Bishops ==
- Bishops of Patos (Roman rite)
  - Expedito Eduardo de Oliveira † (25 February 1959 - 8 May 1983) Died
  - Gerardo de Andrade Ponte † (5 December 1983 - 8 August 2001) Retired
  - Manoel dos Reis de Farias (8 August 2001 - 27 July 2011) Appointed, Bishop of Petrolina
  - Eraldo Bispo da Silva (7 November 2012 – present)

=== Other priest of this diocese who became bishop ===
- Paulo Jackson Nóbrega de Sousa, appointed Bishop of Garanhuns, Pernambuco in 2015
