= Marcelo Pinto Carvalheira =

Brazilian Roman Catholic archbishop

- Archbishop of Paraíba
- Church: Catholic Church
- Archdiocese: Archdiocese of Paraíba
- In office: 29 November 1995 – 5 May 2004
- Predecessor: José Maria Pires
- Successor: Aldo di Cillo Pagotto
- Previous posts: Bishop of Guarabira (1981-1995); Titular Bishop of Bitylius (1975-1981); Auxiliary Bishop of Paraíba (1975-1981)

Orders
- Ordination: 28 February 1953
- Consecration: 27 December 1975 by Hélder Câmara

Personal details
- Born: 1 May 1928 Recife, Pernambuco, Republic of the United States of Brazil
- Died: 25 March 2017 (aged 88) Recife, Pernambuco, Brazil

Marcelo Pinto Carvalheira (1 May 1928 – 25 March 2017) was a Roman Catholic archbishop.

Ordained to the priesthood in 1953, Pinto Carvalheira served as bishop of the Diocese of Guarabira, Brazil, from 1981 to 1995. He had served as auxiliary bishop of the Archdiocese of Paraíba from 1975 to 1981 and then archbishop of the Paraíba from 1995 to 2004.

== See also ==
- Catholic Church in Brazil
