= Church and Convent of Our Lady of the Rosary (João Pessoa) =

Church and convent in Paraíba, Brazil

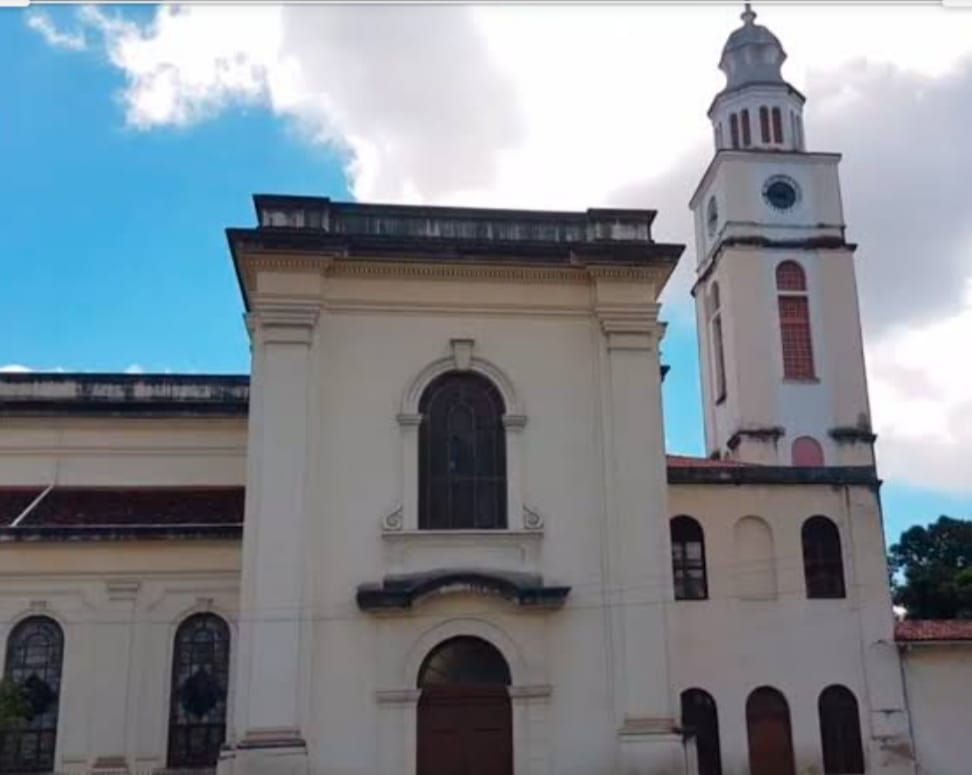
- view of the Church and Convent of Our Lady of the Rosary

Religion
- Affiliation: Roman Catholic Church
- Sect: Franciscan Order
- Diocese: Archdiocese of Paraíba
- Province: Archdiocese of Paraíba
- Ecclesiastical or organizational status: Church
- Patron: Our Lady of the Rosary

Location
- Location: João Pessoa, Paraíba, Brazil
- Interactive map of Church and Convent of Our Lady of the Rosary
- Coordinates: 7.133124078043345°S 34.87959527475117°W

Architecture
- Style: neoclassical architecture
- Completed: 1920

Website
- http://igrejadorosario.org/

Church and Convent of Our Lady of the Rosary is a church and convent dedicated to Our Lady of the Rosary located in the neighborhood of Jaguaribe, in the Historic Center of João Pessoa, capital of the Brazilian state of Paraíba. It stands out for the quality of its neoclassical architecture.

== History ==
The stones for the construction of the convent and the church of the Rosary were ordered in several cities, in parishes, in commerce. Frei Martinho addressed the fairs, the simple people and asked "for the love of God". His faithful assistant, Frei Amadeu, knocked on his friends' doors. The donations came through the penny campaign, popular party, tile party, auctions, sweepstakes, raffles and other means of raising funds

The book Frei Martinho – A living inheritance of the Christian faith also records that the frequent precarious situations that were reached, revealed the filial trust of Frei Martinho in divine Providence. "He had the confidence of a saint," said his confreres. "I know, O Father, that you have often heard me," he always prayed. When there was no reserve in the box, he went, with open arms, to the Queen of the Rosary, whose sanctuary was built; to São José, Santo Antonio and the souls of purgatory. In the last hour he always received the necessary sum, God knows where and from whom ", says the text of the collection about the Franciscan who lived in Paraíba from 1911 to 1930. A circular by Archbishop D. Adauto helped with the collections that were extended to the Dioceses of Natal, Crato and Nazaré. The foundation stone was laid on June 29, 1927, with the blessing of D. Adauto, with the presence of authorities, the clergy and a large crowd.

They helped Frei Martinho in the construction of the new church Frei Amadeu Laumann and Frei José Jost, joiner, among others. On November 1, 1928, just over a year after the blessing of the 1st stone, divine services could already be celebrated in an improvised part of the new construction. On February 2, 1929, the friars were transferred from the Church of Saint Peter Gonzalez to Our Lady of the Rosary. Before, the Franciscan Order had rented a house where they stayed during the day.

== See also ==
- Monastery of St. Benedict
- Cathedral Basilica of Our Lady of the Snows
- Church of Saint Peter Gonzalez
- São Francisco Cultural Center
- Church of Mercy
