= São Francisco Cultural Center =

Church building in Joao Pessoa, Brazil

Cultural Center San Francisco
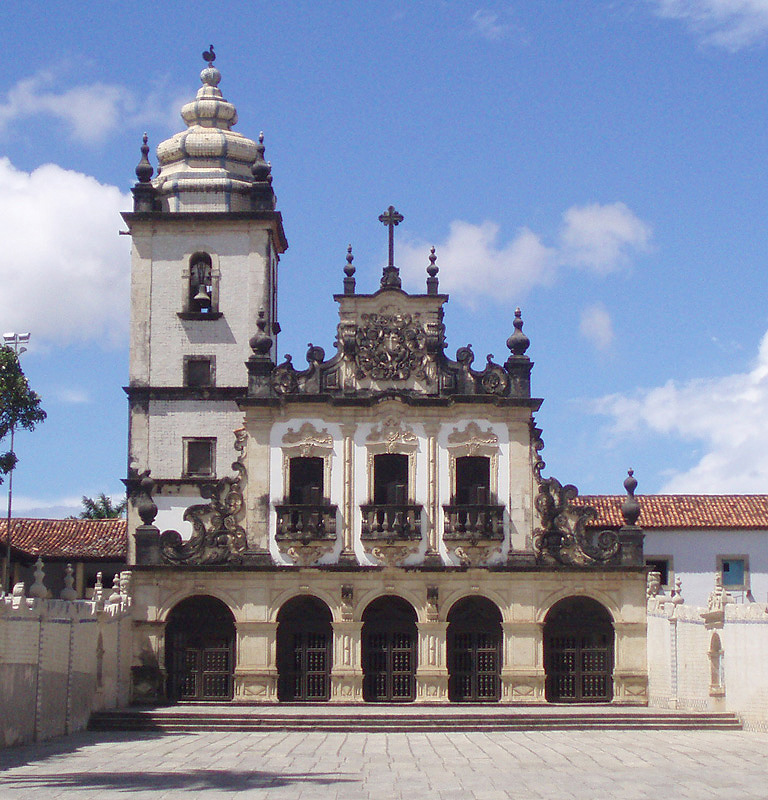

- Location of the Cultural Center San Francisco in Brazil

Religion
- Affiliation: Catholic
- Sect: Franciscan Order
- Rite: Roman
- Ownership: Archdiocese of Paraíba

Location
- Municipality: João Pessoa
- State: Paraíba
- Country: Brazil
- Interactive map of Cultural Center San Francisco
- Coordinates: 07°05′00″S 34°50′00″W

Architecture
- Style: Baroque architecture
- Completed: 1589 - 1788

Website
- http://www.igrejadesaofranciscopb.org/

National Historic Heritage of Brazil
- Designated: 1952
- Reference no.: 407

Cultural Center San Francisco is located in the Paraíba state capital of João Pessoa.

The architectural complex of the Church of San Francisco and the Convent of St. Anthony, was built by Franciscans in 1589 and was completed in 1788. It consists of the Adro, Church, Convent and Cruis. The cultural centre is considered the largest monument in the Baroque style of Latin America. The religious site currently functions as the Sacred-School Museum of Paraíba.

Within the cultural center, a magnificent architectural complex is formed by the Church of San Francisco and the Convent of Santo Antônio. Also present are the Chapel of the Third Order of San Francisco, the Chapel of San Benito, the House of Prayer of the Third (called Chapel Dorada), Cloister of the Third Order, a fountain and a large adro with a transept, constituting one of the most remarkable legacies of the Baroque.

== History ==
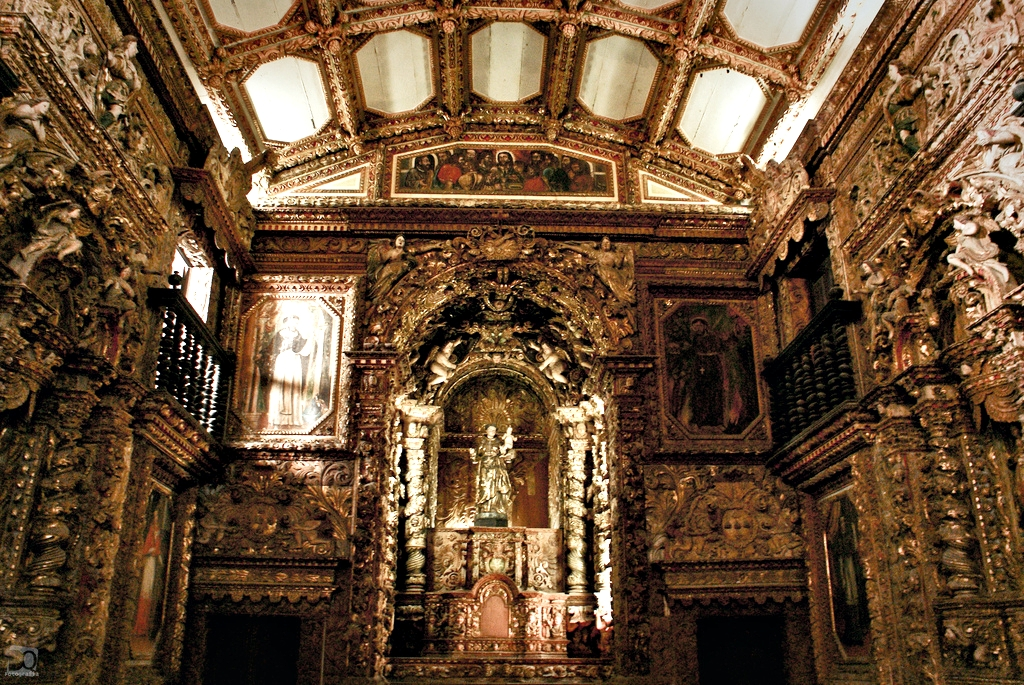
Chapel inside the church, with rich gold carving

The construction was initiated by the friars of the Franciscan Order who came to Paraíba to help the Jesuits in the catechesis of the Indians. Construction began in 1589 and was completed in 1788. It became the residence of Dutch directors during the Dutch invasion; a period in which their works were interrupted.

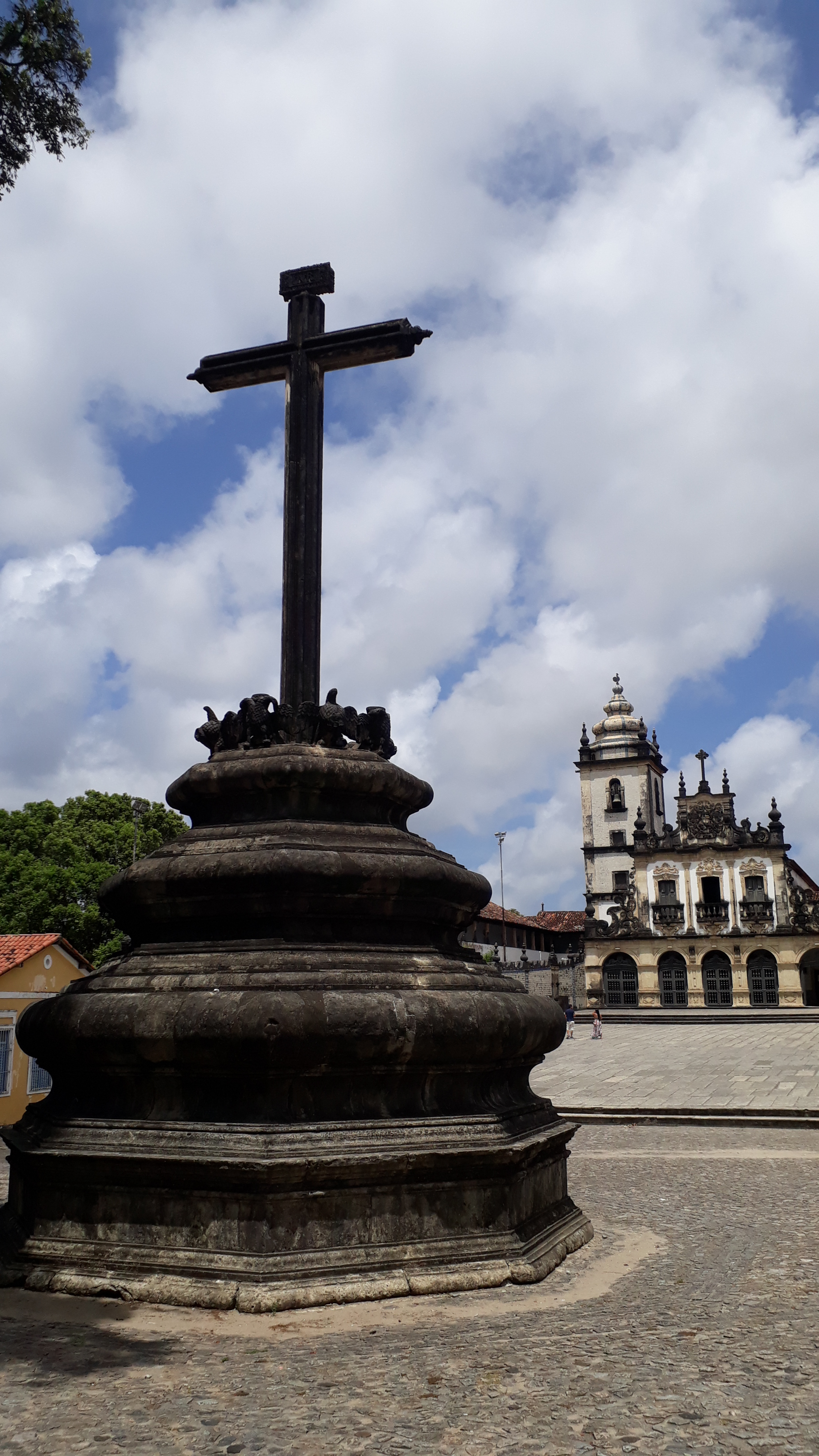
Cross in front of the Church of San Francisco, in João Pessoa, Paraíba

The original project was written by Fray Francisco dos Santos and the main works were completed in 1591. The convent was damaged during the Dutch invasion. The friars were expelled in 1636. A military post was installed because of its strategic location: it dominated the entire Sanhauá valley, extending along the Paraíba river to Cabedelo.

== Design ==
The Church presents a style faithful to the Rococo baroque and is considered one of the most important historical-artistic religious monuments in its category. They emphasize the tower covered with tiles and the superposition of vaults, the carved sandstone, and stylized flowers are interspersed with Baroque reliefs. The walls are covered with Portuguese tiles that form panels on the history of Joseph in Egypt. The pulpit is a work of art with a rich work of gold carving, considered by UNESCO as unique throughout the world. It is speculated that he was influenced by indigenous art.

The adro, on an inclined plane, is surrounded by a wall that is covered with tiles and contains six niches with scenes of the Via Crucis. The transept is formed by a monolithic cross, with pedestal presenting figures of pelicans or the Phoenix mythological bird, "representing Christ feeding the children with their own food and the resurrection". The Adro is surrounded by two large ancient walls and tiles, with six panels representing the stations of the Passion of the Christ. The upper part of the walls is worked in stone.

== Artistic and cultural importance ==
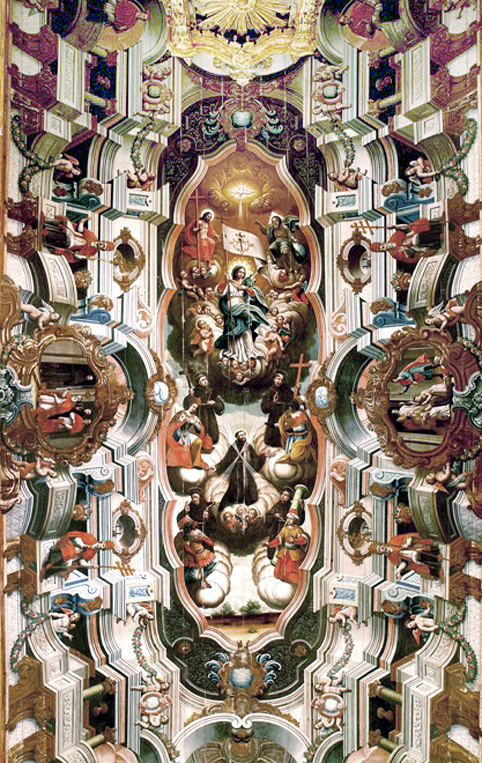
Detail of the Glorification of the Franciscan Saints, on the roof of the church

The critic, photographer, and writer Mário de Andrade described the site:

I arrive in the courtyard of the convent of S. Francisco and the haunted parade .... From the northeast to Bahia, there is no prettier or more original church exterior than this one, and I even believe it is the most graceful church in Brazil - a that not even the sublime Minasirices of Aleijadinho win in grace. There is no doubt that the works of Aleijadinho are of much greater aesthetic, historical, national importance and even the two S. Francisco de Ouro Preto and S. João Del Rei they will be more beautiful, but this one from Paraíba is pure grace, it is beautiful girl, it is parakeet, it is a bonina.

The interior is irregular and is already well damaged by repairs and replacements, it also has a pulpit, proportional and design jewelry. The paintings are also excellent .... The tiles are among the richest I have ever seen, sumptuous. The outer courtyard is walled by them as well and shows niches with scenes of the Passion still on magnificently designed tiles and that, framed by the niches and distant from each other, we can isolate, contemplate and enjoy.

In front of everything the cruise is a formidable monolith.I'm amazed Paraíba has one of the most perfect architectural monuments in Brazil.I did not know ... Few know ....

French art historian Germain Bazin highlighted the Church of San Francisco as the perfect representative of the Franciscan school of architecture of the Brazilian northeast.

Elias Herckmans, a Dutch governor appointed by the West Indies Company to the Captaincy of Paraíba in 1639, briefly describes the Franciscan convent – still in the first phase of the enlargement works – as

the largest and most beautiful [of the city]; is surrounded by a wall, and inside it was built very regularly.

== See also ==
- Church of Mercy
- Church and Convent of Our Lady of the Rosary
- Monastery of St. Benedict
- Cathedral Basilica of Our Lady of the Snows
- Church of Saint Peter Gonzalez
