= Monastery of St. Benedict (João Pessoa) =

Church

Church of the Monastery of Sao Bento
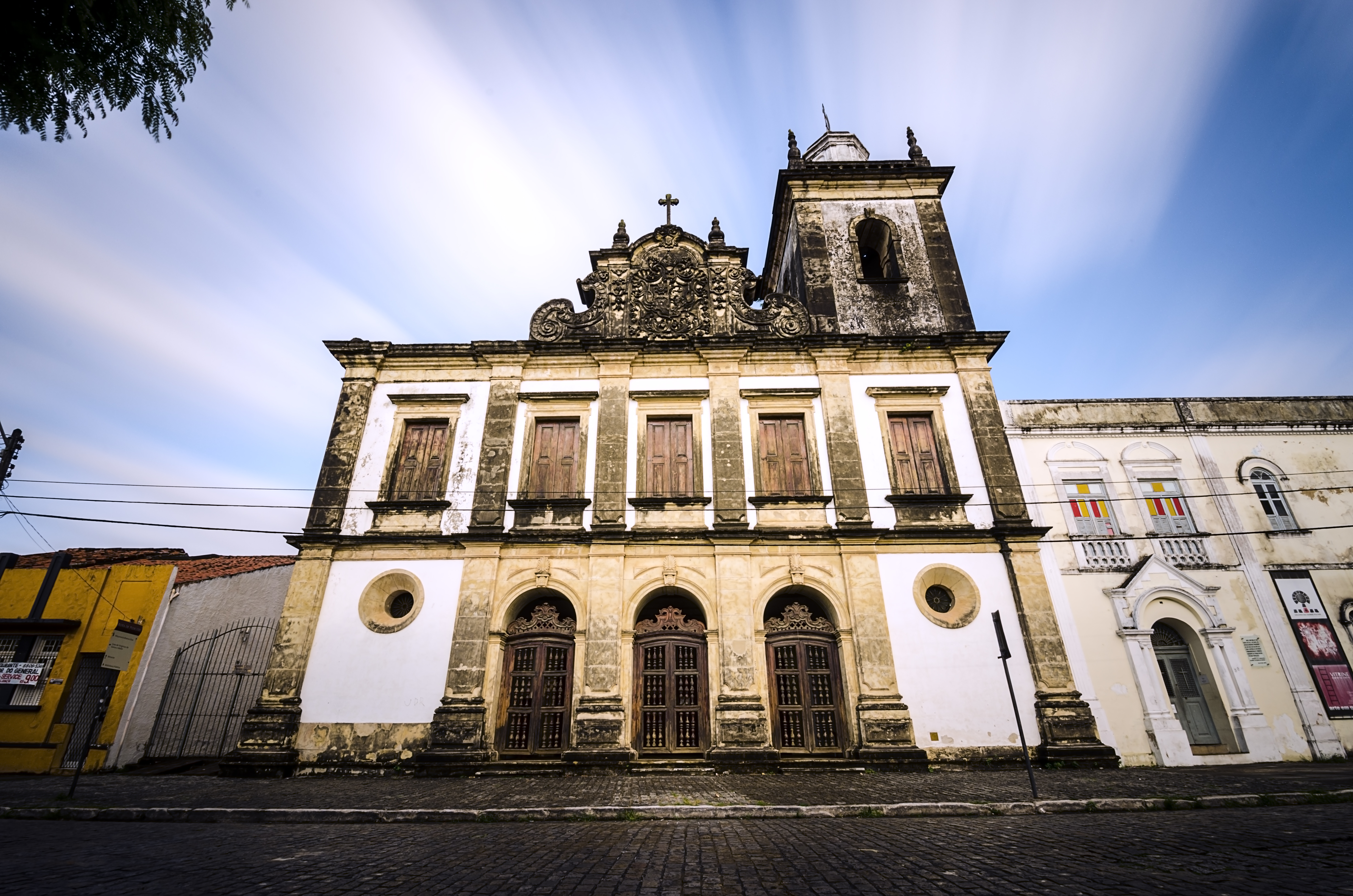
- church of our lady of monte serrat of Monastery of St. benedict

- Location of the Church of the Monastery of Sao Bento in João Pessoa in Brazil

Religion
- Affiliation: Catholic
- Sect: Benedictines
- Rite: Roman
- Ownership: Archdiocese of Paraíba

Location
- Municipality: João Pessoa
- State: Paraíba
- Country: Brazil
- Interactive map of Church of the Monastery of Sao Bento
- Coordinates: 07°05′00″S 34°50′00″W

Architecture
- Style: Baroque architecture
- Founder: Frei Cipriano da Conceição
- Completed: 1585-1811

National Historic Heritage of Brazil
- Designated: 1957
- Reference no.: 63

The Monastery of St. Benedict is formed by the Church and the Monastery, located in the Historic Center of the Brazilian capital of João Pessoa, in the state of Paraíba.

The São Bento Monastery, located in the Historic Center of João Pessoa, is a Baroque style building, built by the Benedictine monks, formed by the monastery and the church, considered one of the most important in Brazil. The construction of the monastery dates from the seventeenth century, and the church, from the eighteenth century, which was listed by the Institute of National Historical and Artistic Heritage (Iphan) on January 10, 1957. In 1995, the complex was restored and currently its interior, there are music concerts and sung masses.

== Story ==
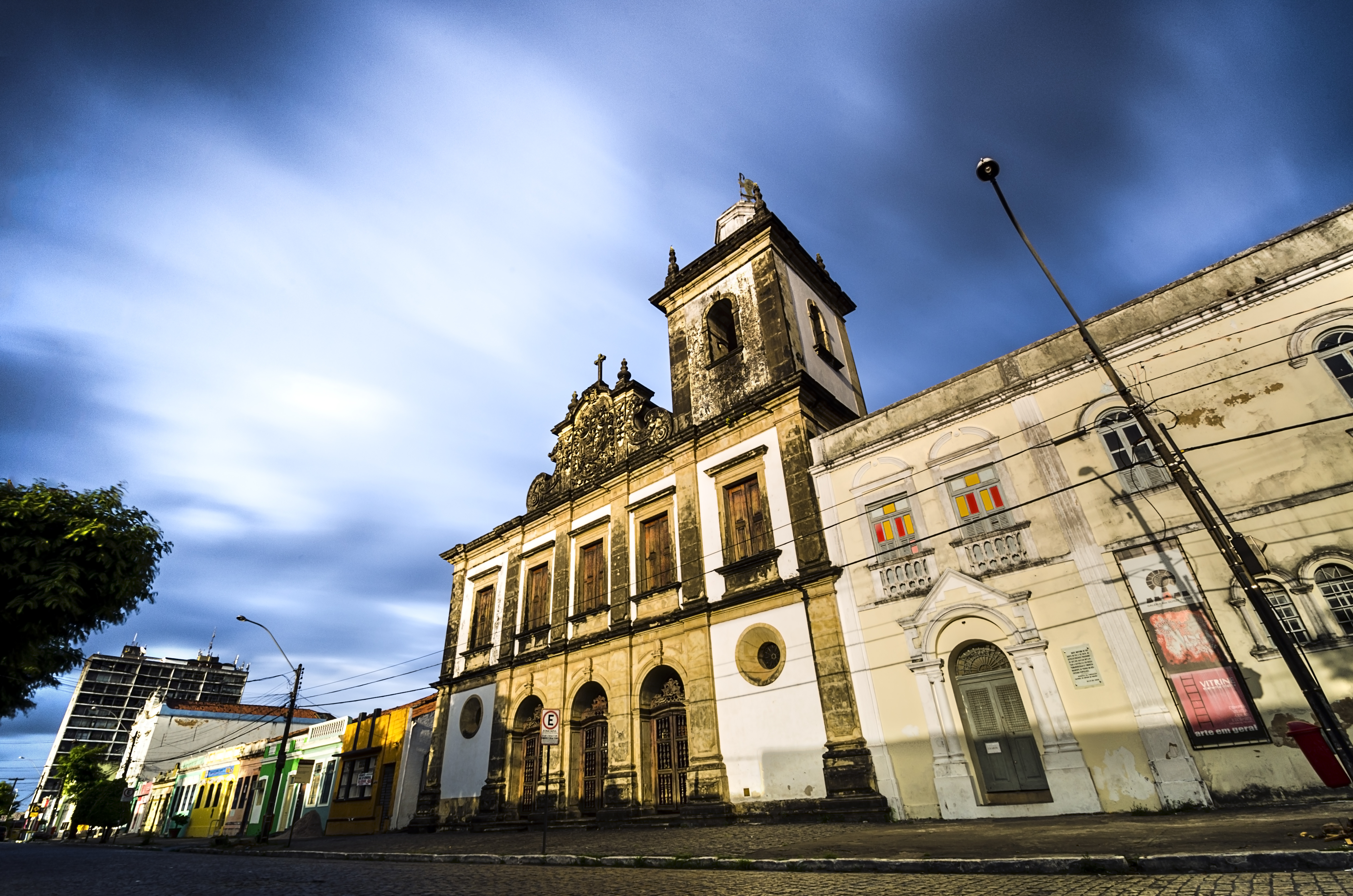
view of the monastery of St. benedict

The Set, formed by the church and the monastery, was built under the invocation of Our Lady of Mount Serrat. The work began when the Benedictines arrived in João Pessoa at the time that the State was the Royal Captaincy of Paraíba, around 1590. After the construction, it became one of the first and main places for religious services established in João Pessoa . And, according to Iphan, this set is among the most important monuments of the country, in its style and its era. The construction of the monastery dates from the seventeenth century, and the church, from the eighteenth century. Currently, the group has undergone an intense recovery that is part of the Revitalization Program of Historic Centers.

Its construction was created by Frei Cipriano of life, a lirelado, the rearguard of the eighteen years to be completed, the tiling, the rear and the throne, and the auscultations continued until 1749, year of prayer of the first non-local mass. As reforms of 1811, were created by João de Santa Rita, enlarging the pavement of the chapel and realizing other repairs.

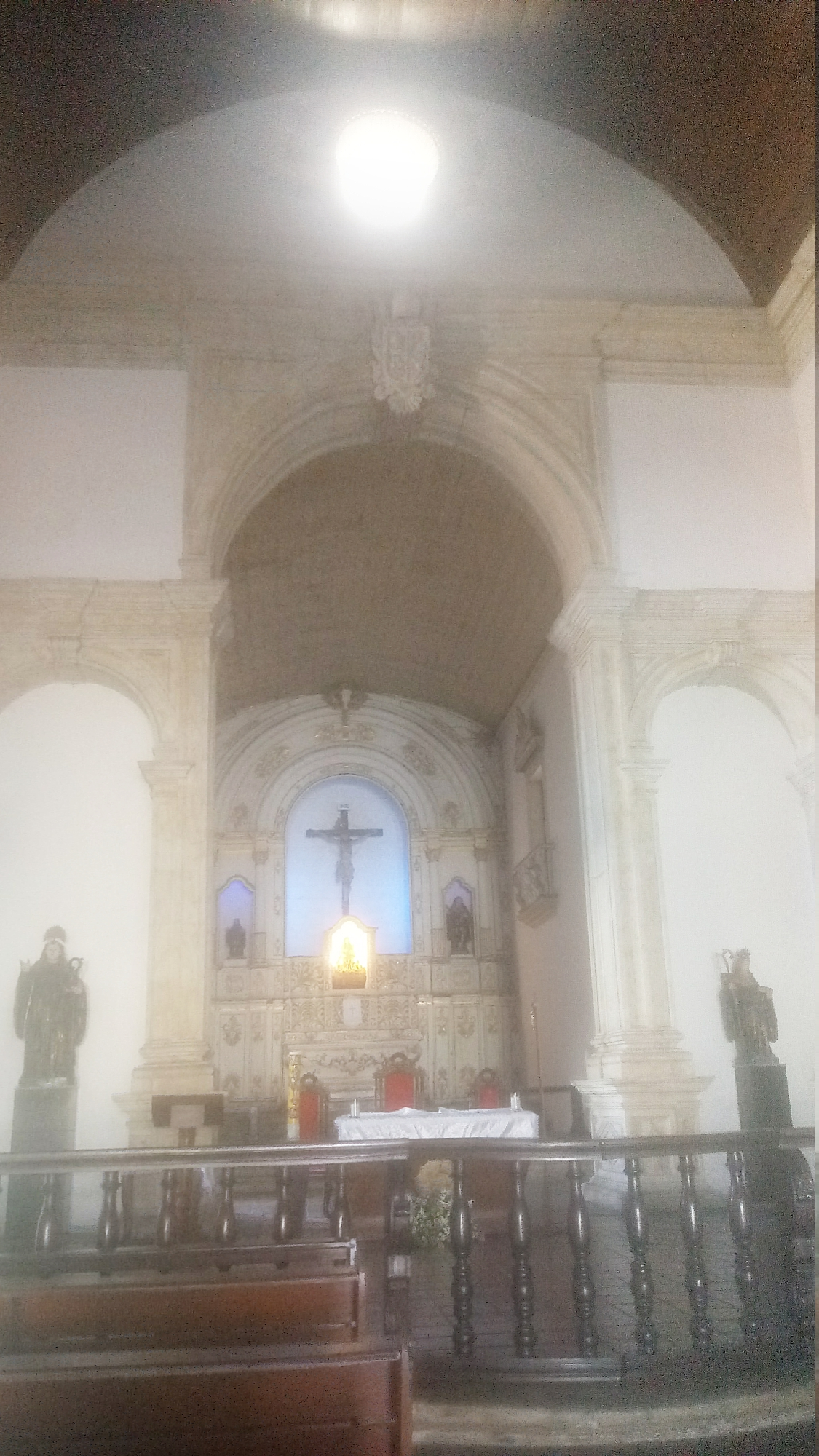
Altar mor of the monastery of St. benedict

Recognized and inscribed as a historical patrimony by IPHAN since January 10, 1957 by the Institute of National Historical and Artistic Heritage (IPHAN), its sober architecture in contrast to the architectural style of other churches of the Benedictine order impresses by the harmony and beauty of its lines, following the canons of the Portuguese constructions in the time of Brazil Colony. In the time of the tipping it was much altered internally, conserving of original the external aspect with one of its two unfinished towers.

In its facade stands the frontispiece, richly worked in limestone, bearing the coat of arms of the Order of St. Benedict. Its tower is surmounted by a dome in stonework, on which is an indicator of the winds, constituted of a copper blade with profile of a lion that revolves around a staff, traditional landmark of the Benedictine churches.

With the closure of the Benedictine activities in João Pessoa in 1921, due to conflict with the jurisdiction of the then 1st bishop of Paraíba, the church remained closed for several years. The group underwent an intense recovery, having their works closed and reopened to the public in 1995.

Currently, the Church of São Bento continues to enchant fies and tourists through concerts of erudite music and sung masses.

== See also ==
- Church of Mercy
- Church and Convent of Our Lady of the Rosary
- Cathedral Basilica of Our Lady of the Snows
- Church of Saint Peter Gonzalez
- São Francisco Cultural Center
