= Heitor de Araújo Sales =

Brazilian Catholic archbishop (born 1926)

His Excellency Heitor de Araújo Sales
- Archbishop Emeritus of Archdiocese of Natal
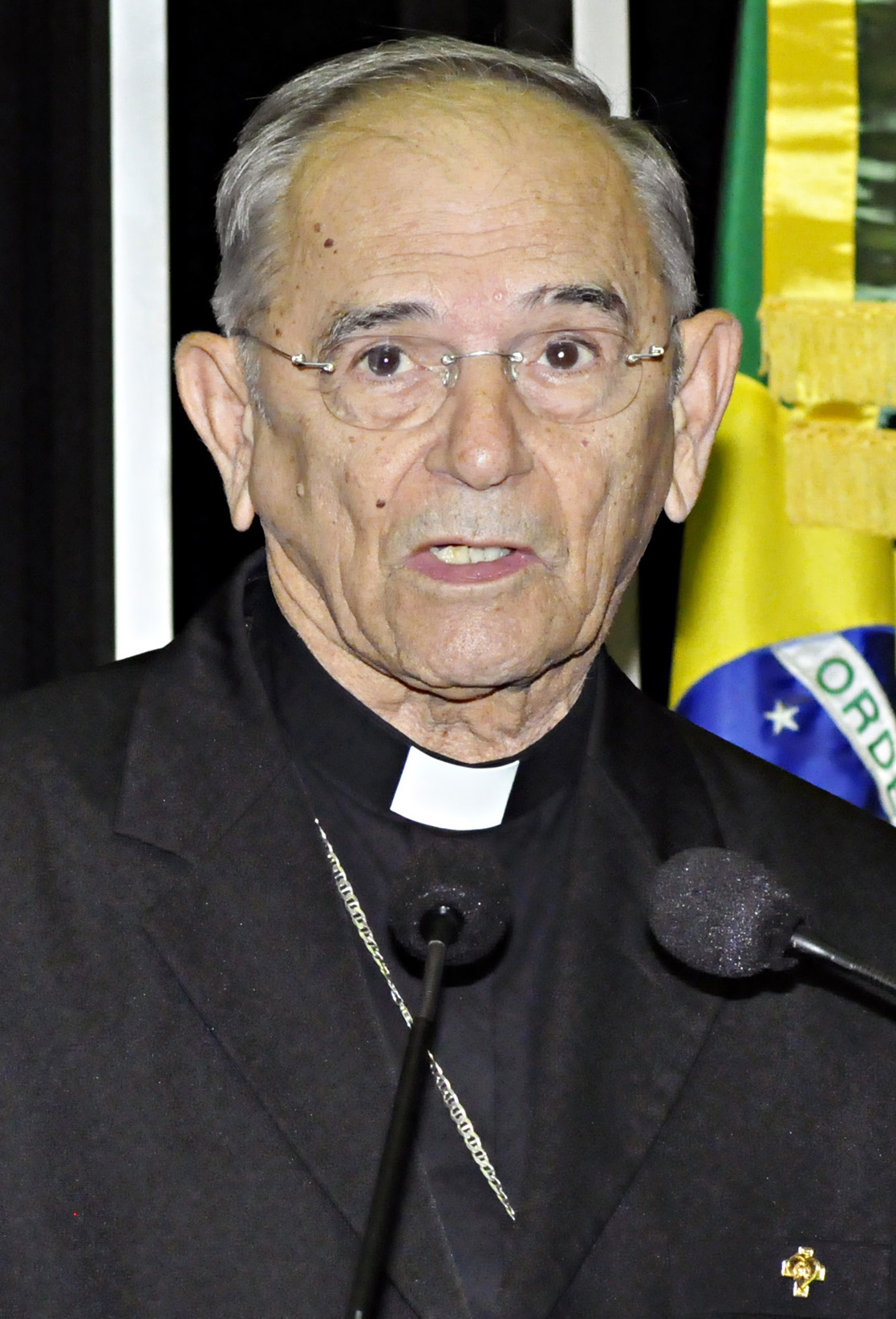
- Heitor de Araújo Sales in 2010
- Appointed: 27 October 1993
- Term ended: 26 November 2003
- Predecessor: Alair Vilar Fernandes de Melo
- Successor: Matias Patrício de Macêdo
- Previous post: Bishop of Caicó (1978–1993)

Orders
- Ordination: 3 December 1950
- Consecration: 16 July 1978 by Cardinal Eugênio Sales

Personal details
- Born: Heitor de Araújo Sales; 29 July 1926 (age 100) São José de Mipibu, Rio Grande do Norte, Brazil
- Parents: Celso Dantas Sales; Josefa de Araujo Sales
- Motto: Unitate, pace, gaudium

Heitor de Araújo Sales (born 29 July 1926) is a Brazilian Roman Catholic prelate, who served as a Diocesan Bishop of Caicó (1978–1993), and later, as an Archbishop of Archdiocese of Natal (1993–2003).

== Biography ==
De Araújo Sales was born in São José de Mipibu, Rio Grande do Norte in Brazil in a family of Celso Dantas Sales and Josefa de Araujo Sales. His older brother was a future Cardinal Eugênio de Araújo Sales. He studied at the Major Seminary of St. Peter in Natal and was ordained priest in Natal, for his native Archdiocese, on 3 December 1950.

In the same year he become a parish priest to the Immaculate Conception parish in Nova Cruz. In 1951, he returned to Natal to serve at the parish of Our Lady of Grace and Saint Therese in Tirol. Still in Natal, he served as a chaplain of the Marist College in 1953. From 1962 to 1978, he held the position of professor at his alma mater, the St Peter Seminary and the Federal University of Rio Grande do Norte. He also served as an episcopal vicar for religious women from 1968 to 1978.

On 5 May 1978 Pope Paul VI appointed him a Diocesan Bishop of the Roman Catholic Diocese of Caicó and he received the episcopal consecration on 16 July of the same year from his brother, archbishop of São Sebastião do Rio de Janeiro, Cardinal Eugênio Sales as a principal consecrator, and a co-consecrators Nivaldo Monte, archbishop of Natal and Manuel Tavares de Araújo, bishop emeritus of Caicó at the Gymnase Olympique in Natal.

On 27 October 1993, he was transferred as a Metropolitan Archbishop to the see of Archdiocese of Natal and on 26 November 2003 he retired from the pastoral governance of the diocese because of the age limit.
