= Córregos =

- Neighbourhood
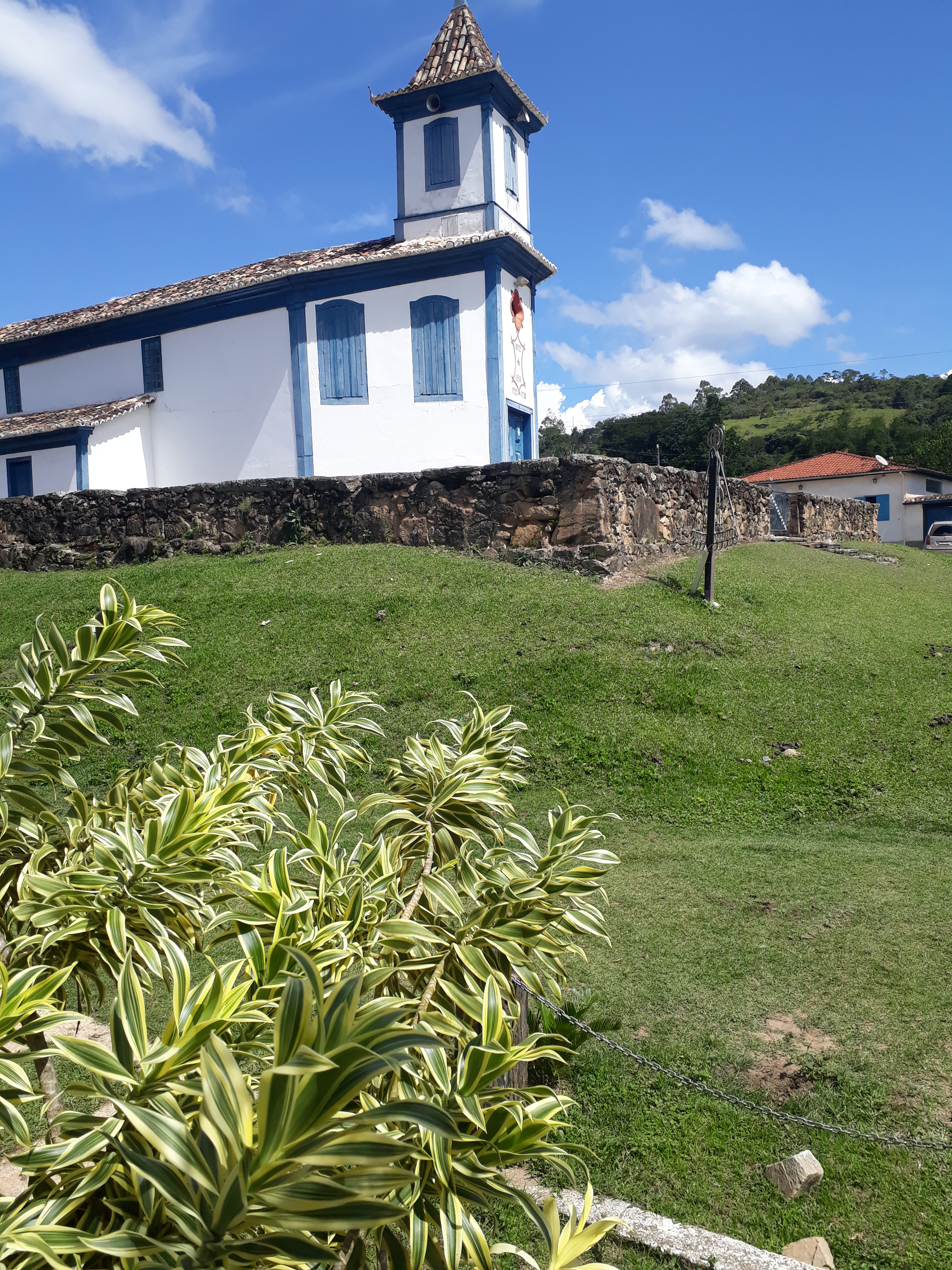
- Our Lady of Aparecida Matriz Church
- Interactive map of Córregos
- Coordinates: 18°53′05.8″S 43°30′03.7″W
- Country: Brazil
- State: Minas Gerais
- City: Conceição do Mato Dentro

Population (2010)
  - Total: 432

Córregos is a neighborhood in the municipality of Conceição do Mato Dentro, Brazil.

== History ==
According to the Brazilian Institute of Geography and Statistics (IBGE), its population in 2010 was 432 inhabitants, 246 men and 186 women, with a total of 282 private households. It was created by Provincial Law No. 2,420, of 5 November 1877.

It is the oldest neighborhood of Conceição do Mato Dentro, that was born and developed around gold extraction. The nice chapel of "Senhor dos Passos" stands on the top of a hill.

== Notable people ==
- José Maria Pires, (1919–2017), archbishop.
