= Aldo di Cillo Pagotto =

Brazilian archbishop (1949–2020)

Aldo di Cillo Pagotto S.S.S.
- Archbishop of Paraíba
- Church: Catholic Church
- Archdiocese: Archdiocese of Paraíba
- In office: 5 May 2004 – 6 July 2016
- Predecessor: Marcelo Pinto Carvalheira
- Successor: Manoel Delson Pedreira da Cruz
- Previous posts: Bishop of Sobral (1998-2004); Coadjutor Bishop of Sobral (1997-1998)

Orders
- Ordination: 7 December 1977 by José Eugênio Corrêa
- Consecration: 31 October 1997 by Cláudio Hummes

Personal details
- Born: 16 September 1949 Santa Bárbara d'Oeste, São Paulo, United States of Brazil
- Died: 14 April 2020 (aged 70) Fortaleza, Ceará, Brazil

Aldo di Cillo Pagotto S.S.S. (16 September 1949 – 14 April 2020) was a Brazilian Catholic archbishop.

== Biography ==
Pagotto was born in Brazil, 16 September 1949. He was ordained to the priesthood in 1977. He served as coadjutor bishop of the Roman Catholic Diocese of Sobral, Brazil, in 1996 and 1997 and as bishop of the Sobral Diocese from 1997 to 2004. He then became archbishop of the Roman Catholic Archdiocese of Paraíba, Brazil, from 2004 to 2016. He died in Fortaleza from COVID-19.
