= Conceição do Mato Dentro =

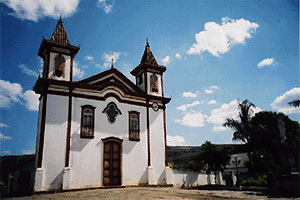
- Igreja Matriz de Conceição do Mato Dentro

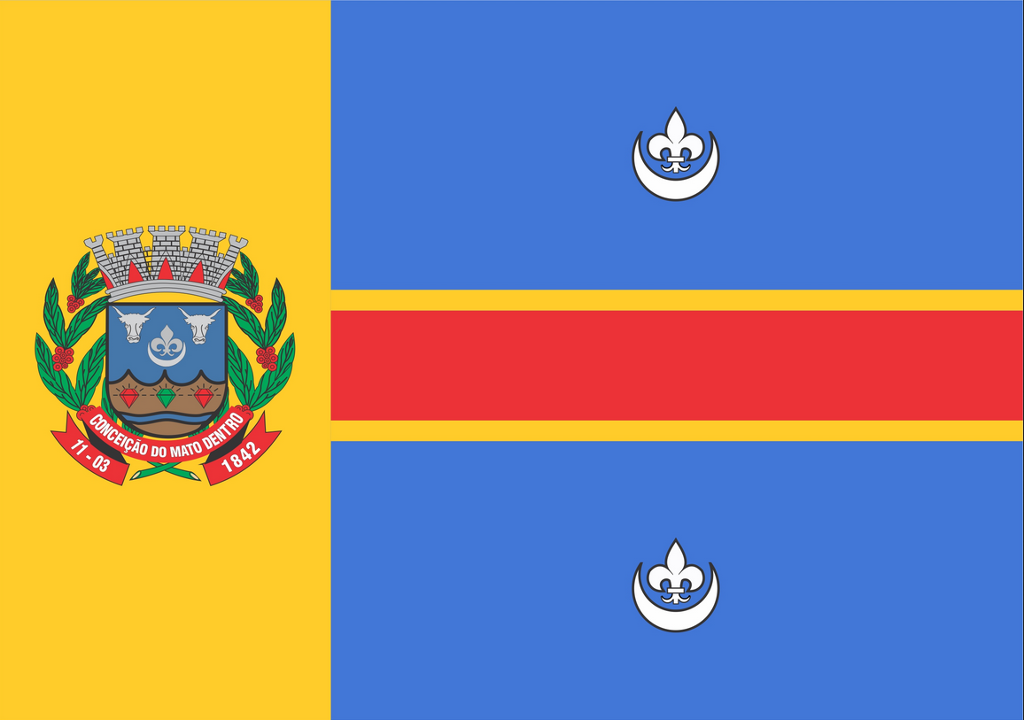
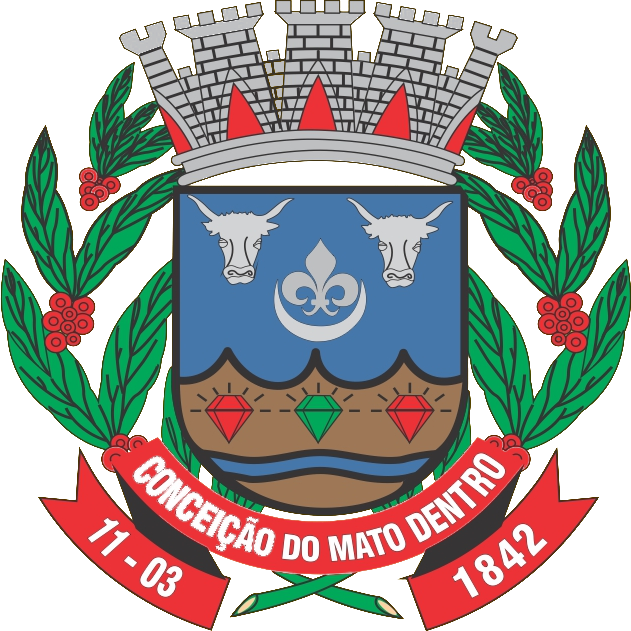
- Flag Coat of arms

- Location in Minas Gerais

- Location in Brazil
- Coordinates: 19°02′13″S 43°25′30″W
- Country: Brazil
- Region: Southeast
- State: Minas Gerais
- Mesoregion: Metropolitana de Belo Horizonte
- Microregion: Conceição do Mato Dentro
- Incorporated (municipality): March 11, 1942

Government
  - Mayor: José Fernando Aparecido de Oliveira

Area
  - Total: 1,671.465 km^{2} (645.356 sq mi)
- Elevation: 700 m (2,300 ft)

Population (2022 Census)
  - Total: 23,163
  - Estimate (2025): 24,559
- Demonym: conceicionense
- Time zone: UTC−3 (BRT)
- CEP postal code: 35860-000
- Area code: 31
- HDI (2010): 0.672
- Website: cmd.mg.gov.br

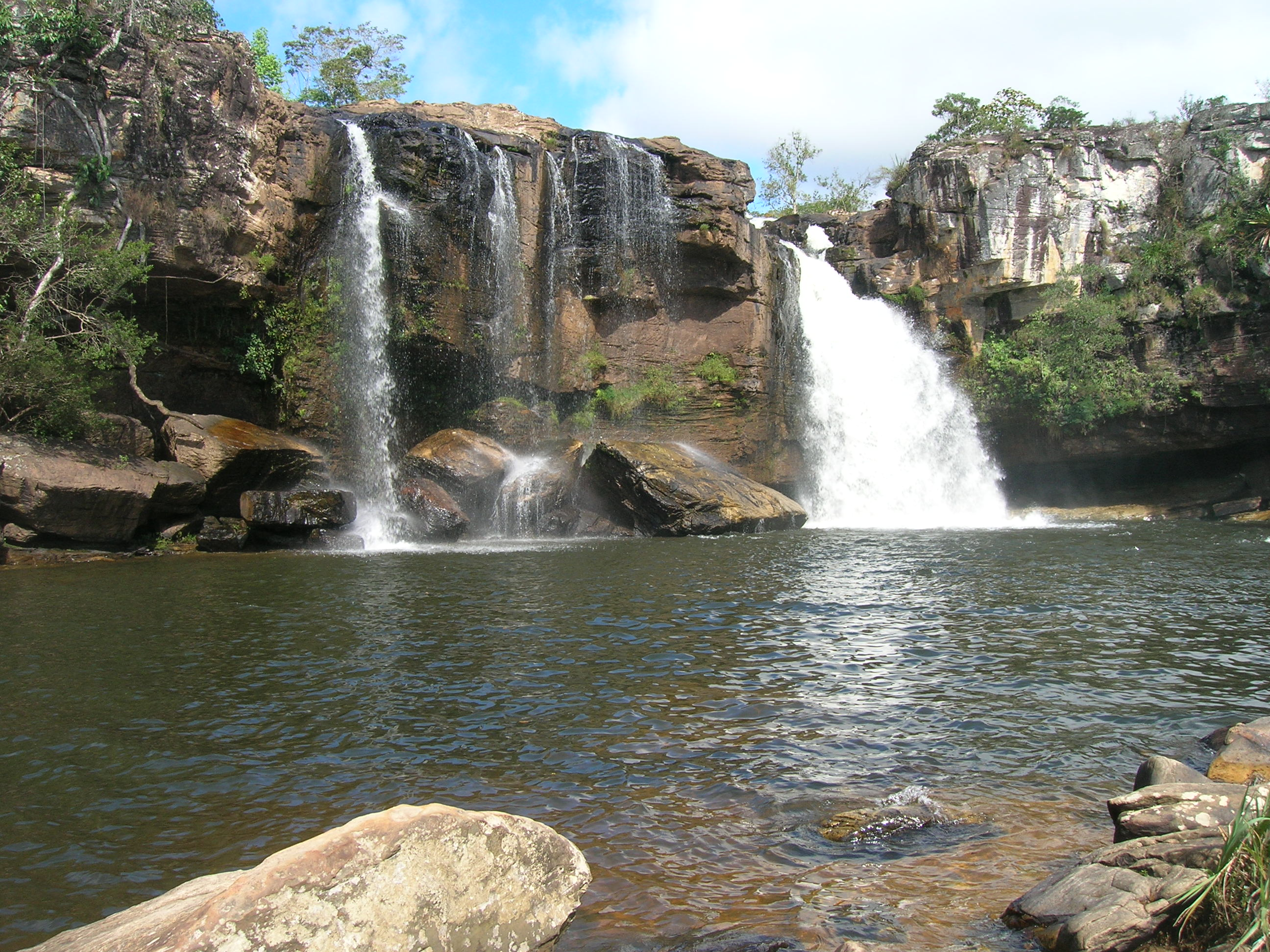
Waterfall "Cachoeira das Três Barras" in Conceição do Mato Dentro

Conceição do Mato Dentro is a Brazilian municipality located in the state of Minas Gerais. The city belongs to the mesoregion Metropolitana de Belo Horizonte and to the microregion of Conceição do Mato Dentro.

== Geography ==
=== Districts ===
Brejaúba, Conceição do Mato Dentro, Córregos, Costa Sena, Itacolomi, Ouro Fino do Mato Dentro, Santo Antônio do Cruzeiro, Santo Antônio do Norte, São Sebastião do Bonsucesso, Senhora do Socorro, Tabuleiro do Mato Dentro.

=== Climate ===
Climate data for Conceição do Mato Dentro (1991–2020)
Month	Jan	Feb	Mar	Apr	May	Jun	Jul	Aug	Sep	Oct	Nov	Dec	Year
Mean daily maximum °C (°F)	30.3 (86.5)	30.6 (87.1)	29.7 (85.5)	28.6 (83.5)	26.4 (79.5)	25.5 (77.9)	25.6 (78.1)	27.0 (80.6)	28.7 (83.7)	29.7 (85.5)	28.8 (83.8)	29.6 (85.3)	28.4 (83.1)
Mean daily minimum °C (°F)	18.9 (66.0)	18.6 (65.5)	18.6 (65.5)	17.1 (62.8)	14.2 (57.6)	11.9 (53.4)	10.8 (51.4)	10.9 (51.6)	13.7 (56.7)	16.6 (61.9)	18.4 (65.1)	18.9 (66.0)	15.7 (60.3)
Average precipitation mm (inches)	244.1 (9.61)	146.0 (5.75)	181.6 (7.15)	86.0 (3.39)	30.1 (1.19)	7.9 (0.31)	6.2 (0.24)	9.0 (0.35)	35.1 (1.38)	93.6 (3.69)	239.4 (9.43)	315.4 (12.42)	1,394.4 (54.90)
Average precipitation days (≥ 1.0 mm)	14	9	11	7	4	1	1	2	4	7	15	16	91
Source: Instituto Nacional de Meteorologia

== See also ==
- List of municipalities in Minas Gerais
- Site from Conceição do Mato Dentro
