= Cathedral Basilica of Our Lady of the Snows, João Pessoa =

Cathedral Basilica of Our Lady of the Snows
- Catedral Basílica Metropolitana Nossa Senhora das Neves
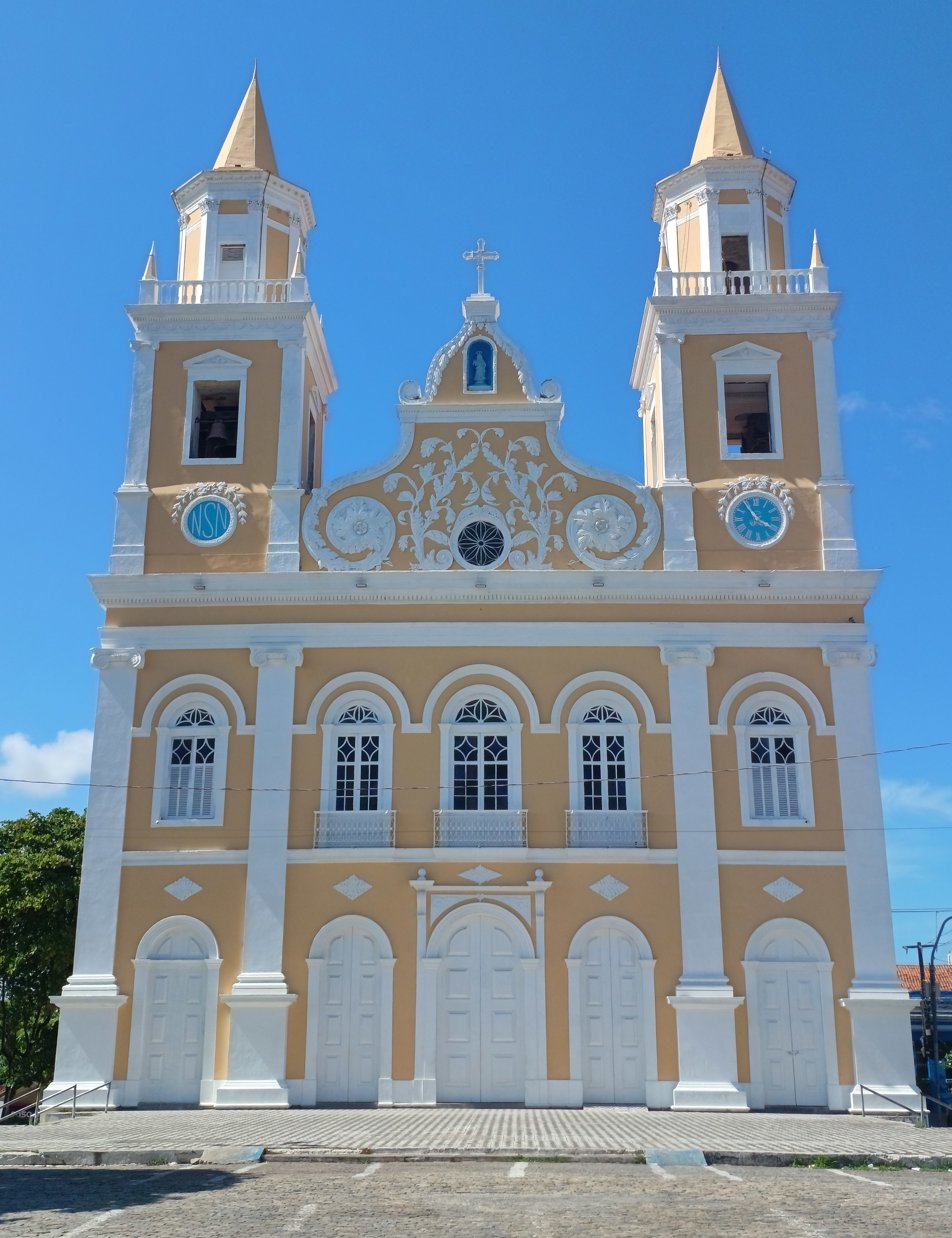
- Cathedral Basilica of Our Lady of the Snows
- 7.1154°S 34.8844°W
- Location: João Pessoa
- Country: Brazil
- Denomination: Roman Catholic Church

The Cathedral Basilica of Our Lady of the Snows (Portuguese: Catedral Basílica Metropolitana Nossa Senhora das Neves) also called João Pessoa Cathedral is a Catholic church located in the old town of João Pessoa, capital of the state of Paraiba in Brazil. It is the seat of the Archdiocese of Paraíba.

A church dedicated to Our Lady of the Snows was built on a hill by the first settlers of Paraiba in 1586. It was a simple building, mud, which was rebuilt in the early seventeenth century. In 1639, a Dutch chronicler Elias Herckmans, refers to it as yet unfinished in its Overview of the Captaincy of Paraiba. The construction and renovation continued during the seventeenth and eighteenth centuries, always in the midst of economic difficulties.

In 1894 it was declared cathedral.

== See also ==
- Roman Catholicism in Brazil
- Our Lady of the Snows (disambiguation)
- Church of Mercy
- Church and Convent of Our Lady of the Rosary
- Monastery of St. Benedict
- Church of Saint Peter Gonzalez
- São Francisco Cultural Center
