= Diocese of Guarabira =

Catholic ecclesiastical territory

Diocese of Guarabira Dioecesis Guarabirensis Diocese de Guarabira

Catholic
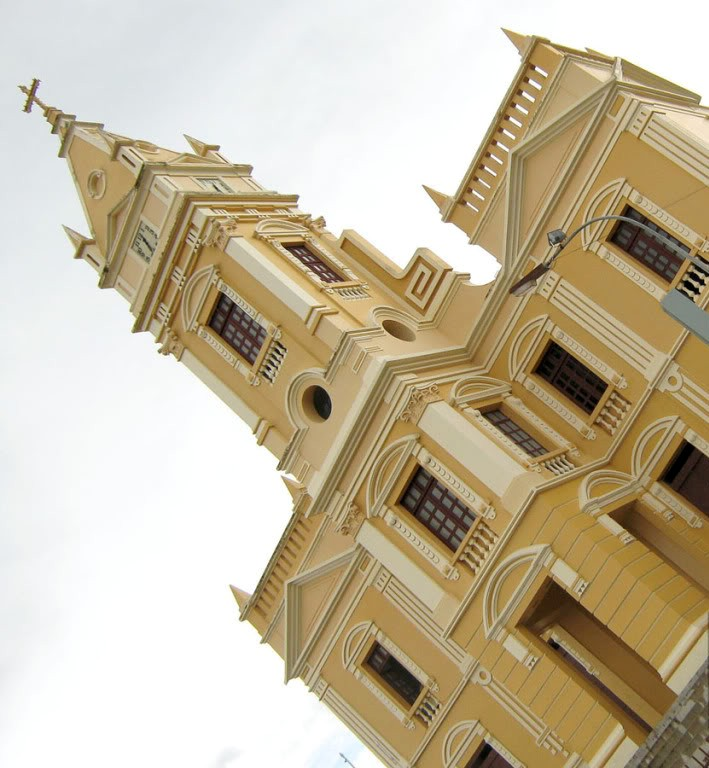
- Cathedral of Our Lady of Light

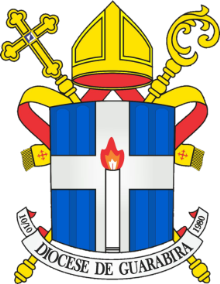
- Coat of arms

Location
- Country: Brazil
- Metropolitan: Archdiocese of Paraíba
- Headquarters: Guarabira, Paraíba, Brazil

Statistics
- Area: 4,391 km^{2} (1,695 sq mi)
- Population: Total; Catholics: (as of 2023); 492,000; 435,000 (88.4%)
- Parishes: 38

Information
- Denomination: Catholic Church
- Sui iuris church: Latin Church
- Rite: Roman Rite
- Established: 11 October 1980; 46 years ago
- Cathedral: Our Lady of Light Cathedral, Guarabira
- Secular priests: 59 (52 Diocesan, 7 Religious Orders)

Current leadership
- Pope: Leo XIV
- Bishop: Edilson Soares Nobre
- Metropolitan Archbishop: Manoel Delson Pedreira da Cruz, O.F.M.Cap.

Website
- diocesedeguarabira.blogspot.com.br

The Roman Catholic Diocese of Guarabira (Latin: Dioecesis Guarabirensis) is a diocese located in the city of Guarabira in the ecclesiastical province of Paraíba in Brazil.

== History ==
- 11 October 1980: Established as Diocese of Guarabira from the Metropolitan Archdiocese of Paraíba

== Leadership ==
Bishops of Guarabira (Roman rite)

- Marcelo Pinto Carvalheira (9 November 1981 – 29 November 1995), appointed Archbishop of Paraíba
- Antônio Muniz Fernandes, O.Carm. (4 February 1998 – 22 November 2006), appointed Archbishop of Maceió, Alagoas
- Francisco de Assis Dantas de Lucena (28 May 2008 – 13 July 2016), appointed Bishop of Nazaré, Pernambuco
- Aldemiro Sena dos Santos (4 October 2017 – 4 February 2026), appointed Bishop of Teixeira de Freitas–Caravelas, Bahia
- Edilson Soares Nobre (13 May 2026 – Present)
