= Archdiocese of Natal =

Catholic ecclesiastical territory

Coordinates: 5.7881°S 35.2038°W

Metropolitan Archdiocese of Natal Archidioecesis Metropolitae Natalensis

Catholic
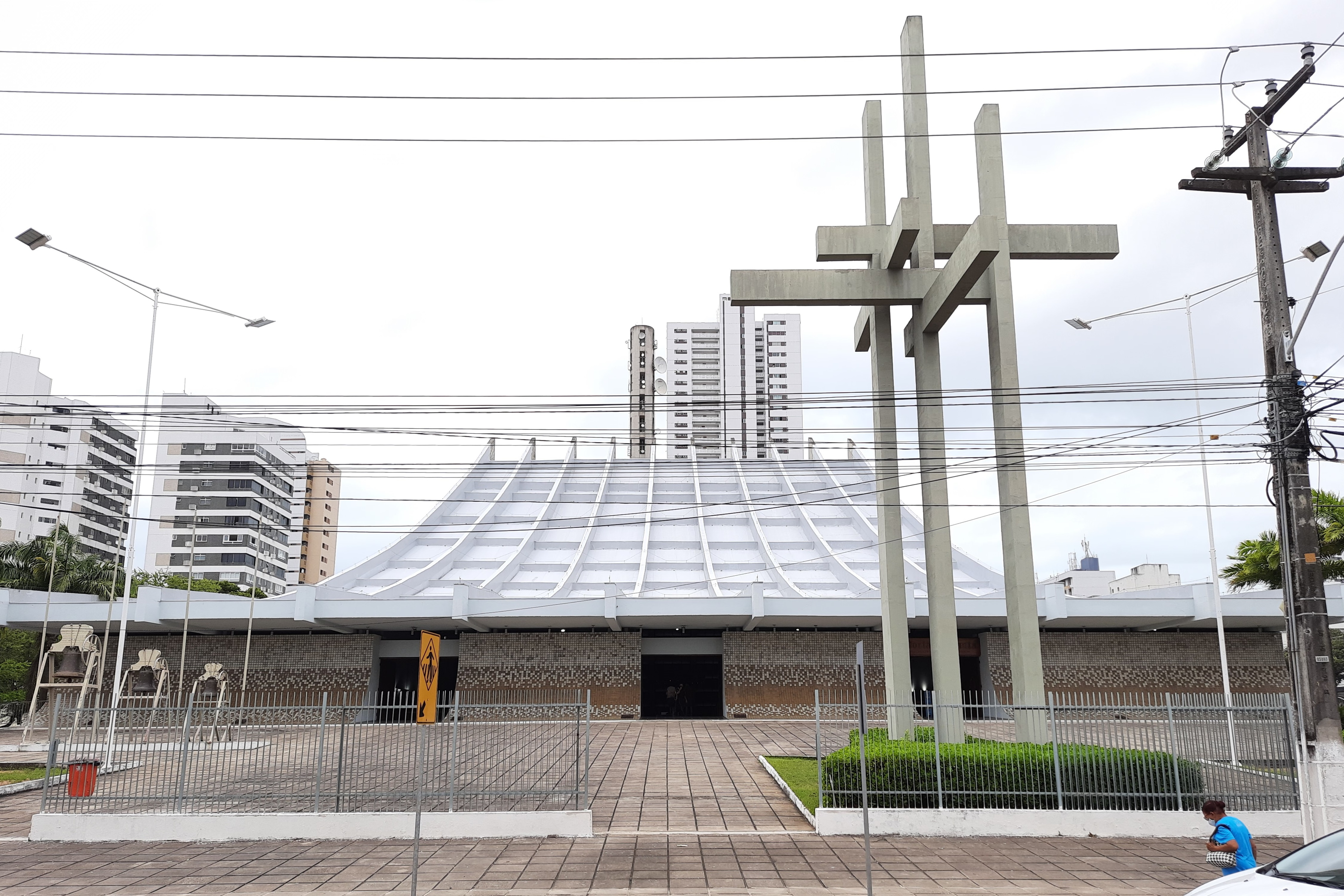
- Cathedral

- Coat of arms

Location
- Country: Brazil

Statistics
- Area: 25,153 km^{2} (9,712 sq mi)
- Population: Total; Catholics: (as of 2004); 1,923,667; 1,627,542 (84.6%)

Information
- Rite: Latin Rite
- Established: 29 December 1909 (116 years ago)
- Cathedral: Catedral Metropolitana; Nossa Senhora da Apresentação

Current leadership
- Pope: Leo XIV
- Metropolitan Archbishop: João Santos Cardoso
- Auxiliary Bishops: José Silvio de Brito
- Bishops emeritus: Heitor de Araújo Sales; Matias Patrício de Macêdo; Jaime Vieira Rocha

Website
- www.arquidiocesedenatal.org.br

The Roman Catholic Metropolitan Archdiocese of Natal (Latin: Archidioecesis Metropolitae Natalensis) is an archdiocese located in the city of Natal in Brazil.

== History ==
- December 29, 1909: Established as the Diocese of Natal from the Diocese of Paraíba
- February 16, 1952: Promoted as the Metropolitan Archdiocese of Natal

== Bishops ==
=== Ordinaries, in reverse chronological order ===
- Archbishops of Natal (Roman rite), below
  - Archbishop João Santos Cardoso (since 2023.07.05)
  - Archbishop Jaime Vieira Rocha (2011.12.21 - 2023.07.)
  - Archbishop Matias Patrício de Macêdo (2003.11.26 – 2011.12.21)
  - Archbishop Heitor de Araújo Sales (1993.10.27 – 2003.11.26)
  - Archbishop Alair Vilar Fernandes de Melo (1988.04.06 – 1993.10.27)
  - Archbishop Nivaldo Monte (1967.09.06 – 1988.04.06)
  - Archbishop Marcolino Esmeraldo de Souza Dantas (1952.02.16 – 1967.04.08)
- Bishops of Natal (Roman Rite), below
  - Bishop Marcolino Esmeraldo de Souza Dantas (later Archbishop) (1929.03.01 – 1952.02.16)
  - Bishop José Pereira Alves (1922.10.27 – 1928.01.27)
  - Bishop Antônio dos Santos Cabral (1917.09.01 – 1921.11.21), appointed Bishop of Belo Horizonte; future Archbishop
  - Bishop Joaquim Antônio d’Almeida (1910.10.23 – 1915.06.14)

=== Auxiliary bishops ===
- Eugênio de Araújo Sales (1954–1964), appointed Apostolic Administrator of São Salvador da Bahia; future Cardinal
- Antônio Soares Costa, appointed Bishop of Caruaru, Pernambuco in 1993

=== Other priests of this diocese who became bishops ===
- José Tomas Gomes da Silva, appointed Bishop of Aracajú in 1911
- Francisco Canindé Palhano, appointed Bishop of Bonfim, Bahia in 2006
- Edilson Soares Nobre, appointed Bishop of Oeiras, Piaui in 2017

== Suffragan dioceses ==
- Diocese of Caicó
- Diocese of Mossoró

== Sources ==
- GCatholic.org
- Catholic Hierarchy
- Archdiocese website (Portuguese)
