= João Santos Cardoso =

Brazilian Roman Catholic Archbishop

His Grace, The Most Reverend, Mons. Dom. João Santos Cardoso
- Metropolitan Archbishop of Natal
- Church: Roman Catholic Church
- Archdiocese: Natal
- Province: Natal
- Metropolis: Natal
- Appointed: July 2023
- Predecessor: Dom. Jaime Vieira Rocha
- Previous posts: Bishop of São Raimundo Nonato (2011–2015); Bishop of Roman Catholic Diocese of Bom Jesus da Lapa (2015–2023)

Orders
- Consecration: 12 February 2012

Personal details
- Born: 3 December 1961 (age 64) Bahia, Brazil.
- Denomination: Catholic Church
- Occupation: Archbishop, Prelate
- Profession: Theologian, Philosopher
- Motto: IN EO QUI ME CONFORTAT

João Santos Cardoso (born December 3, 1961) is a Brazilian Catholic prelate who has served as the Metropolitan Archbishop of Natal since July 2023. He became a bishop in 2011, and served as bishop of Roman Catholic Diocese of Bom Jesus da Lapa from 2015 to 2023.

== Biography ==
Dom. João Santos Cardoso was born on 3 December 1961 in Bahia, Brazil. He studied in philosophy at the Seminary of Teófilo Otoni-MG and in theology at the Instituto de Teologia de Ilhéus in Ilhéus-BA.

His ordination as a priest was on 27 December 1986 and incardination was in the archdiocese of Vitória da Conquista. He begin his pastoral work as following: parish administrator, parish priest, coordinator of the Biblical School and the theology course for the laity; rector of the philosophy seminary; professor of the Universidade Estadual do Sudoeste da Bahia in Vitória da Conquista-BA; professor and director of the archdiocesan institute of philosophy; member of the College of Consultors and the Presbyteral Council; regional vicar; representative of priests; and archdiocesan pastoral coordinator. In addition, he has served as parish vicar in Rieti and Blera, Italy.

He earned double licentiate and doctoral degrees in philosophy and theology from Pontifical Gregorian University in Rome.

His appointment as bishop of São Raimundo Nonato was on 14 December 2011, and his episcopal consecration was on 12 February 2012. In 2015, he was appointed as bishop of the diocese of Bom Jesus da Lapa. In July 2023, he appointed as metropolitan archbishop of Natal.

Within the National Conference of Bishops of Brazil, he has served as president of the Region Nordeste 3, which includes the ecclesiastical circumscriptions of the States of Bahia and Sergipe.
