= José Maria Pires =

Brazilian bishop (1919–2017)

The Most Reverend José Maria Pires
- Bishop of Archdiocese of Paraíba (emeritus)
- Church: Roman Catholic Church
- See: Archdiocese of Paraíba
- In office: 1965–1995
- Predecessor: Mário de Miranda Villas-Boas
- Successor: Marcelo Pinto Carvalheria
- Previous post: Priest

Orders
- Ordination: December 20, 1941
- Consecration: September 22, 1957 by José Newton de Almeida Baptista
- Rank: Archbishop

Personal details
- Born: March 15, 1919 Córregos, Brazil
- Died: August 27, 2017 (aged 98) Belo Horizonte, Brazil

José Maria Pires (March 15, 1919 – August 27, 2017) was a Brazilian bishop of the Roman Catholic Church. Pires was the oldest living Catholic bishop in Brazil at the time of his death at age 98.

== Biography ==
Pires was born in Córregos, Brazil and was ordained a priest on December 20, 1941. He was appointed bishop of the Diocese of Araçuaí on May 25, 1957 and consecrated on September 22, 1957, becoming the first black bishop in the history of Catholic church in Brazil.

On December 2, 1965, Pires was appointed archbishop of the Archdiocese of Paraíba until his retirement on November 29, 1995. He died in Belo Horizonte on 27 August 2017, at the age of 98, due to a respiratory failure caused by pneumonia.

== Publishing ==
- O grito de milhões de escravas: a cumplicidade do silêncio (1983)
- A cultura religiosa afro-brasileira e seu impacto na cultura universitária (2014)
- Meditações diante da cruz (2015)
- O sacerdote, imagem de Cristo (2016)
