= Diocese of Sobral =

Catholic ecclesiastical territory

Diocese of Sobral Dioecesis Sobralensis Diocese de Sobral

Catholic
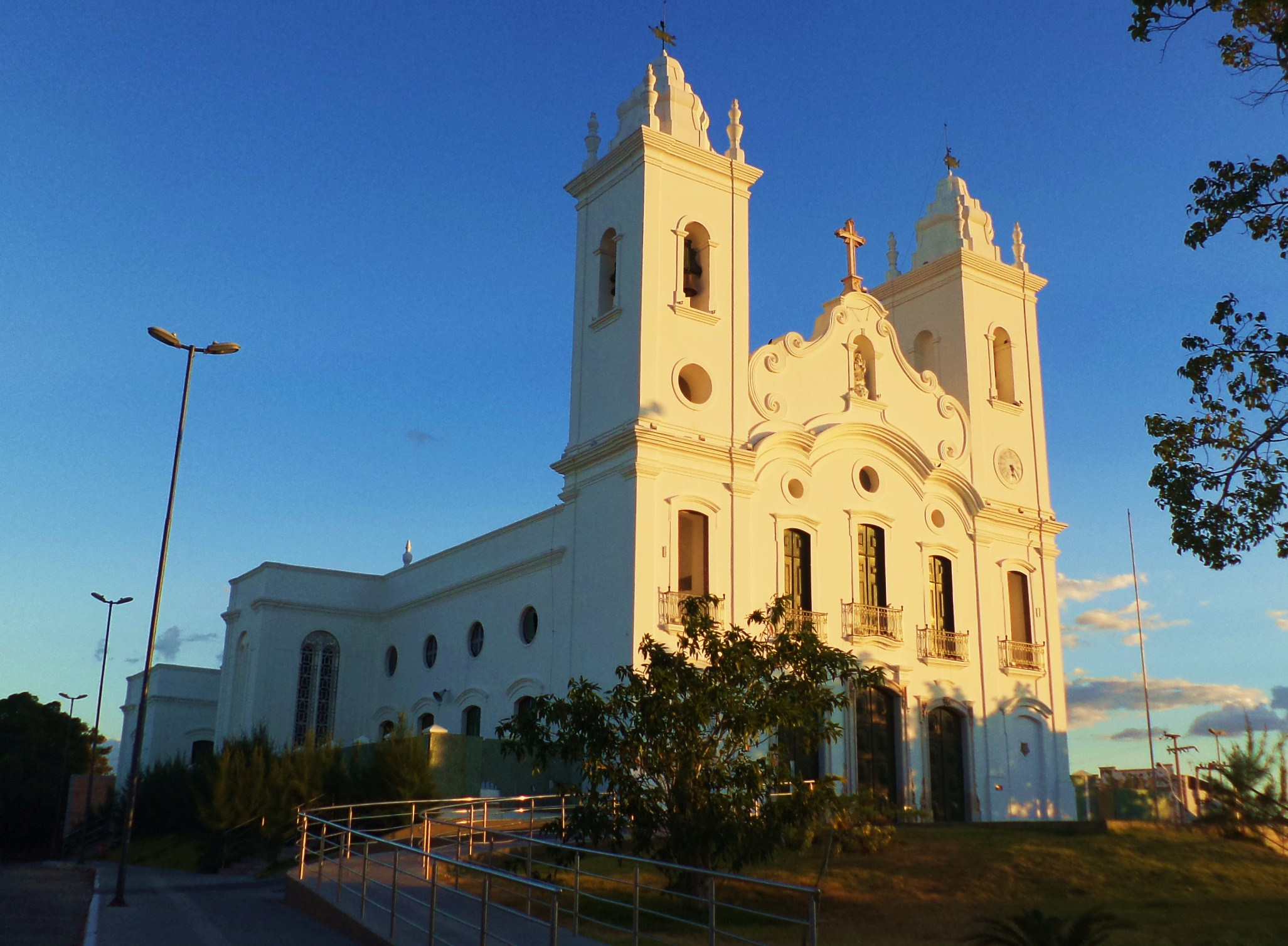
- Catedral Nossa Senhora da Conceição in 2014

Location
- Country: Brazil
- Ecclesiastical province: Fortaleza
- Metropolitan: Fortaleza

Statistics
- Area: 18,920 km^{2} (7,310 sq mi)
- Population: Total; Catholics: (as of 2010); 917,000; 777,000 (84.7%)

Information
- Rite: Latin Rite
- Established: 10 November 1915 (110 years ago)
- Cathedral: Catedral Nossa Senhora da Conceição

Current leadership
- Pope: Leo XIV
- Bishop: José Luiz Gomes de Vasconcelos
- Metropolitan Archbishop: José Antônio Aparecido Tosi Marques

Website
- Website of the Diocese

The Roman Catholic Diocese of Sobral (Latin: Dioecesis Sobralensis, Portuguese: Diocese de Sobral) is a diocese located in the city of Sobral in the ecclesiastical province of Fortaleza in Brazil.

== History ==
- November 10, 1915: Established as Diocese of Sobral from the Diocese of Ceará

== Bishops ==
- Bishops of Sobral (Roman rite)
  - José Tupinambá da Frota (1916.01.24 – 1923.04.06)
  - João José da Mota e Albuquerque (1961.02.28 – 1964.04.28), appointed Archbishop of São Luís do Maranhão
  - Walfrido Teixeira Vieira (1965.01.06 – 1998.03.18)
  - Aldo de Cillo Pagotto, S.S.S. (1998.03.18 – 2004.05.05), appointed Archbishop of Paraíba
  - Fernando Antônio Saburido, O.S.B. (2005.05.18 – 2009.07.01), appointed Archbishop of Olinda e Recife, Pernambuco
  - Odelir José Magri, M.C.C.I. (2010.10.11 - 2015.02.14), appointed Bishop of Chapecó, Santa Catarina
  - José Luiz Gomes de Vasconcelos (2015.07.08 - present)

=== Coadjutor bishop ===
- Aldo de Cillo Pagotto, S.S.S. (1997-1998)

=== Auxiliary bishop ===
- José Bezerra Coutinho (1956-1961), appointed Bishop of Estância, Sergipe
