= Diocese of Caicó =

Catholic ecclesiastical territory

Coordinates: 6.4582°S 37.0928°W

Diocese of Caicó Dioecesis Caicoënsis

Catholic

Location
- Country: Brazil
- Ecclesiastical province: Natal

Statistics
- Area: 9,372 km^{2} (3,619 sq mi)
- Population: Total; Catholics: (as of 2006); 277,000; 264,000 (95.3%)

Information
- Denomination: Catholic Church
- Rite: Latin Rite
- Established: 25 November 1939; 86 years ago
- Cathedral: Catedral Sant’Ana

Current leadership
- Pope: Leo XIV
- Bishop: Antônio Ranis Rosendo dos Santos, C.Ss.R.
- Metropolitan Archbishop: João Santos Cardoso

Website
- www.diocesedecaico.com.br

The Roman Catholic Diocese of Caicó (Latin: Dioecesis Caicoënsis) is a diocese located in the city of Caicó in the ecclesiastical province of Natal in Brazil.

== History ==
- November 25, 1939: Established as Diocese of Caicó from the Diocese of Natal

== Bishops ==
- Bishops of Caicó (Roman rite), in reverse chronological order
  - Bishop Antônio Ranis Rosendo dos Santos, C.Ss.R. (2025.02.14 – Present)
  - Bishop Antônio Carlos Cruz Santos, M.S.C. (2014.05.24 – 2024.04.24), appointed Bishop of Petrolina, Pernambuco
  - Bishop Manoel Delson Pedreira da Cruz, O.F.M.Cap. (2006.07.05 – 2012.08.08), appointed Bishop of Campina Grande, Paraiba; future Archbishop
  - Bishop Jaime Vieira Rocha (1995.11.29 – 2005.02.16), appointed Bishop of Campina Grande, Paraiba
  - Bishop Heitor de Araújo Sales (1978.05.05 – 1993.10.27), appointed Archbishop of Natal, Rio Grande do Norte
  - Bishop Manuel Tavares de Araújo (1959.01.08 – 1978.03.29), resigned
  - Bishop José Adelino Dantas (1952.06.10 – 1958.05.03), appointed Bishop of Garanhuns, Pernambuco
  - Bishop José de Medeiros Delgado (1941.03.15 – 1951.09.04), appointed Archbishop of São Luís do Maranhão, Brazil

=== Other priest of this diocese who became bishop ===
- Francisco de Assis Dantas de Lucena, appointed Bishop of Guarabira, Paraiba in 2008
