= Diocese of Cajazeiras =

Catholic ecclesiastical territory

Coordinates: 6.8869°S 38.5577°W

Diocese of Cajazeiras Dioecesis Caiazeirasensis

Catholic
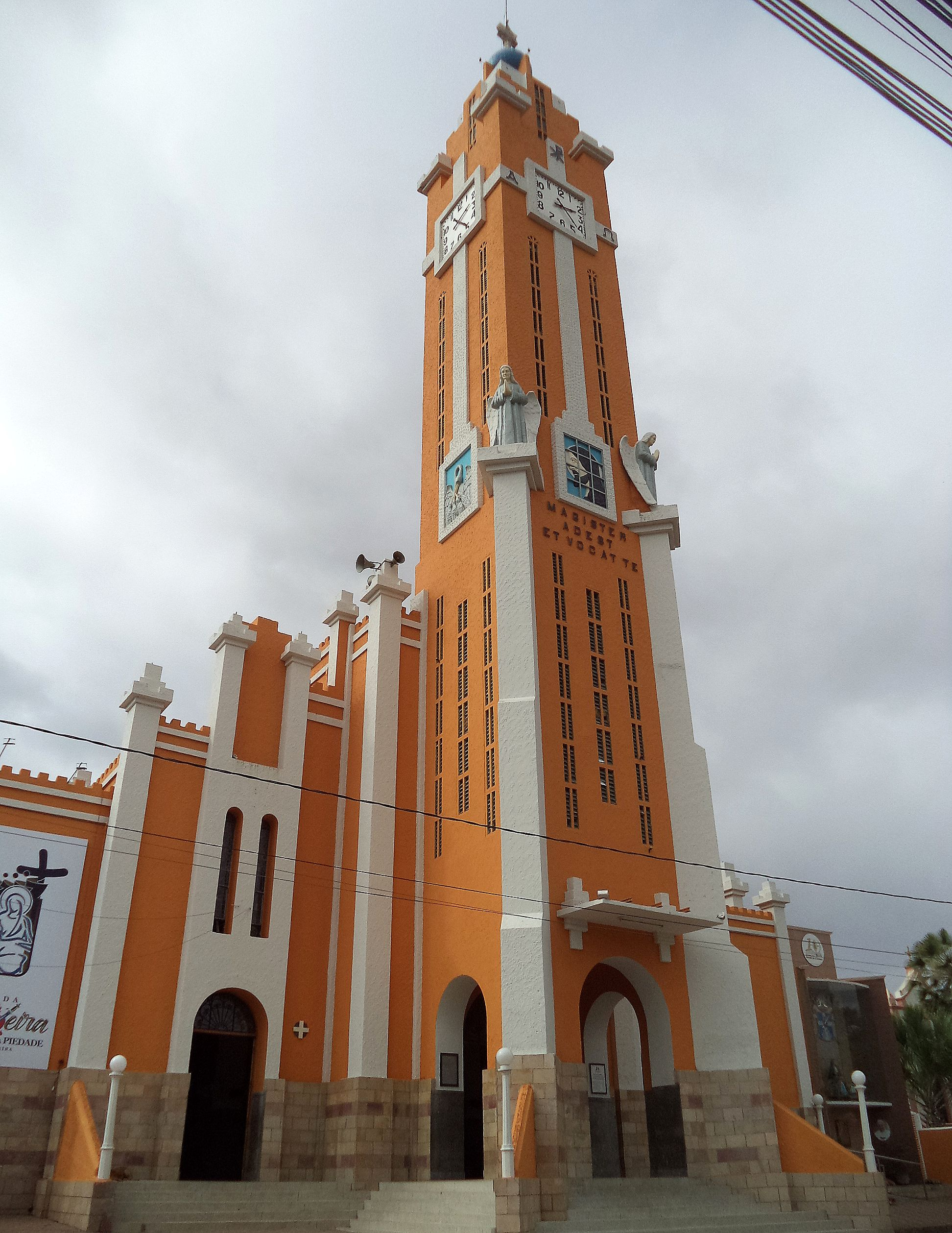
- Catedral Nossa Senhora da Piedade

Location
- Country: Brazil
- Ecclesiastical province: Paraíba

Statistics
- Area: 13,934 km^{2} (5,380 sq mi)
- Population: Total; Catholics: (as of 2004); 533,909; 507,278 (95.0%)

Information
- Rite: Latin Rite
- Established: 6 February 1914 (112 years ago)
- Cathedral: Catedral Nossa Senhora da Piedade

Current leadership
- Pope: Leo XIV
- Bishop: Francisco de Assis Gabriel dos Santos, C.Ss.R.
- Metropolitan Archbishop: Manoel Delson Pedreira da Cruz, O.F.M. Cap.
- Bishops emeritus: José Gonzalez Alonso

The Roman Catholic Diocese of Cajazeiras (Latin: Dioecesis Caiazeirasensis) is a diocese located in the city of Cajazeiras in the ecclesiastical province of Paraíba in Brazil.

== History ==
- 6 February 1914: Established as Diocese of Cajazeiras from the Diocese of Paraíba

== Bishops ==
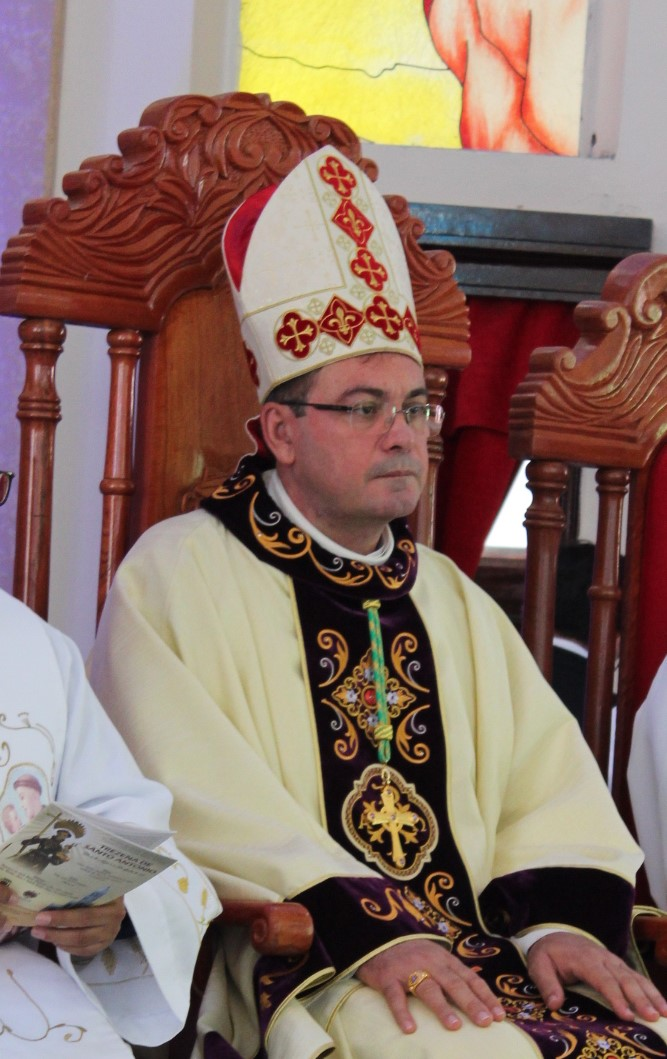
Bishop Francisco de Assis Gabriel dos Santos, C.Ss.R.

=== Bishops of Cajazeiras (Roman rite) ===
in reverse chronological order

- Bishop Francisco de Assis Gabriel dos Santos, C.Ss.R. (9 April 2025 – present)
- Bishop Francisco de Sales Alencar Batista, O. Carm. (8 June 2016 – 18 November 2023), appointed Bishop of Mossoró
- Bishop José Gonzalez Alonso (20 June 2001 – 16 September 2015)
- Bishop Matias Patrício de Macêdo (12 July 1990 - 12 July 2000), appointed Coadjutor Bishop of Campina Grande, Paraiba; future Archbishop
- Bishop Zacarias Rolim de Moura (27 April 1953 – 12 July 1990)
- Bishop Luis do Amaral Mousinho (30 August 1948 – 18 March 1952), appointed Bishop of Ribeirão Preto; future Archbishop
- Bishop Henrique Gelain (29 July 1944 – 22 May 1948), appointed Bishop of Cafelândia
- Bishop José da Matha de Andrade y Amaral (24 March 1934 – 12 May 1941), appointed Bishop of Amazonas
- Bishop Moisés Ferreira Coelho (later Archbishop) (16 November 1914 – 12 February 1932), appointed Coadjutor Archbishop of Paraíba
