= Archdiocese of Paraíba =

Catholic ecclesiastical territory

Coordinates: 7.1154°S 34.8844°W

Archdiocese of Paraíba Archidioecesis Parahybensis

Catholic
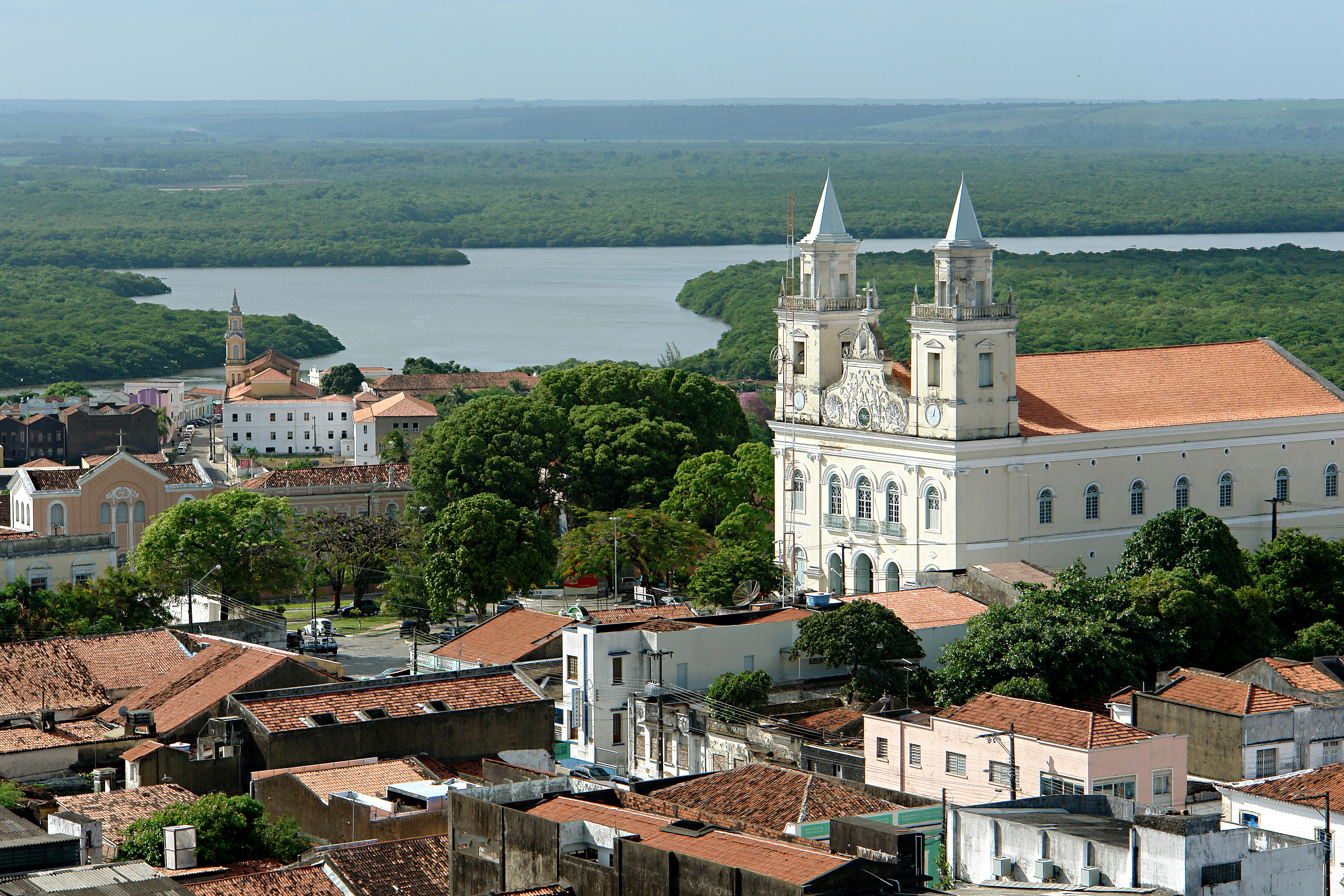

- Coat of arms

Location
- Country: Brazil

Statistics
- Area: 7,713 km^{2} (2,978 sq mi)
- Population: Total; Catholics: (as of 2004); 1,240,022; 1,030,416 (83.1%)

Information
- Rite: Latin Rite
- Established: 27 April 1892 (134 years ago)
- Cathedral: Catedral Basílica Metropolitana Nossa Senhora das Neves

Current leadership
- Pope: Leo XIV
- Archbishop: Manoel Delson Pedreira da Cruz, OFMCap

Website
- www.arquidiocesepb.org.br

The Roman Catholic Archdiocese of Paraíba (Latin: Archidioecesis Parahybensis) is a Latin Metropolitan archdiocese, named after the city of João Pessoa, which used to be named Paraíba, in southeastern Brazil.

Its cathedral archiepiscopal see is a minor basilica, the Cathedral Basilica of Our Lady of the Snows (Catedral Basílica Metropolitana Nossa Senhora das Neves), in the city of João Pessoa, the state capital.

== History ==
- Established on April 27, 1892 as the Diocese of Paraiba, on territory split off from the then Diocese of Olinda
- Lost territory on 1909.12.29 to establish the then Diocese of Natal (now Metropolitan itself)
- Promoted on February 6, 1914 as the Metropolitan Archdiocese of Paraíba, having lost territory to establish its senior suffragan, the Diocese of Cajazeiras
- Lost territory twice again to establish more suffragan sees: on 1949.05.14 the Diocese of Campina Grande and on 1980.10.11 the Diocese of Guarabira.

== Statistics ==
As per 2014, it pastorally served 1,288,000 Catholics (82.8% of 1,556,103 total) on 6,703 km² in 89 parishes and 8 missions with 151 priests (116 diocesan, 35 religious), 37 deacons, 259 lay religious (41 brothers, 218 sisters) and 45 seminarians.

== Ecclesiastical province ==
Its Suffragan sees are:

- Roman Catholic Diocese of Cajazeiras, a daughter
- Roman Catholic Diocese of Campina Grande, a daughter
- Roman Catholic Diocese of Guarabira, youngest daughter
- Roman Catholic Diocese of Patos

== Bishops ==
(all Roman Rite)

=== Episcopal ordinaries ===
Suffragan Bishops of Paraíba

- Bishop Adauctus Aurélio de Miranda Henriques (1894.01.02 – 1914.02.06 see below)

Metropolitan Archbishops of Paraíba

- Adauctus Aurélio de Miranda Henriques (see above 1914.02.06 – death 1935.08.15)
- Moisés Ferreira Coelho (1935.08.16 – death 1959.04.18), previously Bishop of Cajazeiras (Brazil) (1914.11.16 – 1932.02.12), then Titular Archbishop of Berœa (1932.02.12 – 1935.08.16) as Coadjutor Archbishop of Paraíba (1932.02.12 – succession 1935.08.16)
  - Auxiliary Bishop: Manuel Pereira da Costa (1954.05.31 – 1959.06.20), Titular Bishop of Knin (1954.05.31 – 1959.06.20); later Bishop of Nazaré (Brazil) (1959.06.20 – 1962.08.23), Bishop of Campina Grande (Brazil) (1962.08.23 – retired 1981.05.20), died 2006
- Mário de Miranda Villas-Boas (1959.06.20 – retired 1965.05.18), emeritate as Titular Archbishop of Gibba (1965.05.18 – death 1968.02.23); previously Bishop of Garanhuns (Brazil) (1938.05.26 – 1944.09.10), Metropolitan Archbishop of Belém do Pará (Brazil) (1944.09.10 – 1956.10.23), Titular Archbishop of Cyrrhus (1956.10.23 – 1959.06.20) as never succeeding Coadjutor Archbishop of São Salvador da Bahia (Brazil) (1956.10.23 – 1959.06.20)
- José Maria Pires (1965.12.02 – retired 1995.11.29); previously Bishop of Araçuaí (Brazil) (1957.05.25 – 1965.12.02)
- Marcelo Pinto Carvalheira (1995.11.29 – retired 2004.05.05), also Vice-President of National Conference of Bishops of Brazil (1998 – 2003); previously Titular Bishop of Bitylius (1975.10.29 – 1981.11.09) as Auxiliary Bishop of Paraíba (1975.10.29 – 1981.11.09), Bishop of Guarabira (Brazil) (1981.11.09 – 1995.11.29)
- Aldo de Cillo Pagotto, Congregation of the Blessed Sacrament (S.S.S.) (2004.05.05 – retired 2016.07.06), previously Coadjutor Bishop of Sobral (Brazil) (1997.09.10 – 1998.03.18) succeeding as Bishop of Sobral (1998.03.18 – 2004.05.05)
- Apostolic Administrator Genival Saraiva de França (2016.07.06 – 2017.03.08), former Bishop of Palmares (Brazil) (2000.07.12 – 2014.03.19)
- Manoel Delson Pedreira da Cruz, OFMCap (2017.03.08 – ...), previously Bishop of Caicó (Brazil) (2006.07.05 – 2012.08.08), Bishop of Campina Grande (Brazil) (2012.08.08 – 2017.03.08).

=== Coadjutor archbishop ===
- Moisés Sizenando Coelho (1932-1935)

=== Auxiliary bishops ===
- Manuel Pereira da Costa (1954-1959), appointed Bishop of Nazaré, Pernambuco
- Marcelo Pinto Carvalheira (1975-1981), appointed Archbishop here

== See also ==
- List of Catholic dioceses in Brazil

== Sources and external links ==
- GCatholic.org, with Google map and satellite photo - data for all sections
- Catholic Hierarchy
- Archdiocese website (Portuguese)
