= Mechtilde of the Blessed Sacrament =

French nun

Servant of God Mechtilde of the Blessed Sacrament OSB
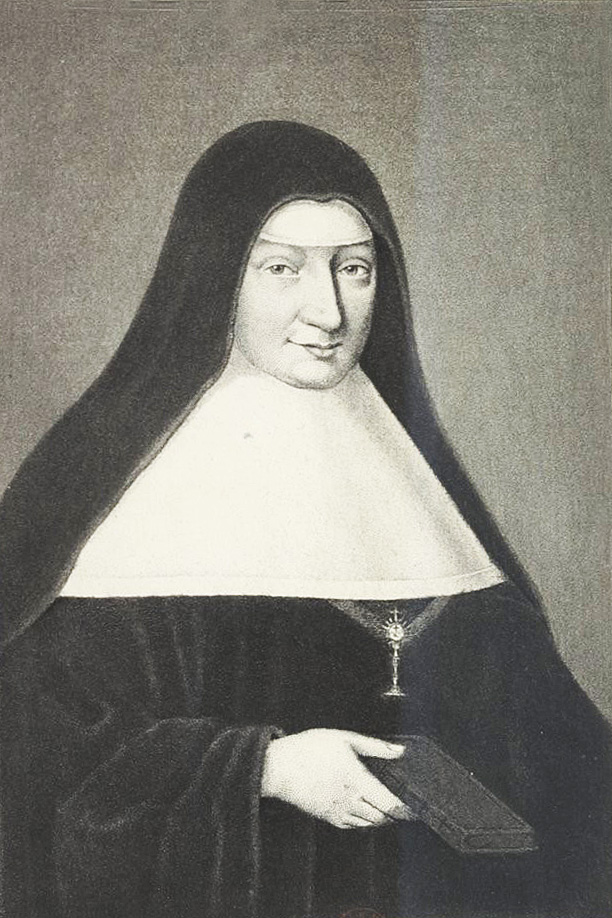
- Born: 31 December 1614; Saint-Die, Vosges, France
- Died: 6 April 1698 (aged 83); Paris, France
- Venerated in: Roman Catholic Church
- Major works: Mectildiana

Mechtilde of the Blessed Sacrament, born Catherine de Bar (31 December 1614 – 6 April 1698) was a French nun, the founder of the order of Benedictine Nuns of Perpetual Adoration of the Blessed Sacrament. She is recognized as the Servant of God in the Catholic Church.

== Life ==
Catherine de Bar was born at Saint-Dié, Lorraine in northeastern France, on 31 December 1614, the third child of Jean and Marguerite de Guillon de Bar. They belonged to the lower nobility.

At the age of seventeen, Catherine joined the Annonciade at Bruyères, taking the name Sister Catherine of Saint-John the Evangelist. Two years later, she was made mother-superior there. In May 1635, Mother de Bar, and the nuns of the convent in Bruyères were forced to flee before the Swedish army. Some nuns exhausted by hardships fell ill with the plague. Catherine de Bar and five other nuns found shelter with the Benedictines in Rambervillers. Invited to join that religious community, they did so, Catherine taking the new name of "Mechtilde".

In 1653 in Paris she founded the Order of the Benedictine Nuns of Perpetual Adoration of the Blessed Sacrament. This was the first society formally organized for the Perpetual Adoration of the Blessed Sacrament

== Works ==
Mectildiana - collected works of Mechtilde in 13 volumes.

== See also ==
- Eucharistic adoration
- Blessed Sacrament
- Maria Candida of the Eucharist
- Marguerite Guillot
