= Servants of the Most Blessed Sacrament =

Servants of the Most Blessed Sacrament is a Roman Catholic religious institute of women, founded by the Pierre-Julien Eymard in 1858, assisted by Marguerite Guillot, with the authorization of François-Nicholas-Madeleine Morlot, the Archbishop of Paris.

A decree of Pope Pius IX (21 July 1871) canonically erected it into a religious congregation, and on 8 May 1885 Pope Leo XIII approved the constitutions. The aim of the society is to render "before all else solemn and perpetual adoration to Our Lord Jesus Christ, abiding perpetually in the Most Blessed Sacrament of the Altar for the love of men". "The Congregation of the Servants of the Most Blessed Sacrament devote themselves with all their souls and all their strength to propagate this same worship of adoration and love in the world, especially by means of the People's Eucharistic League in the way that was erected by a Rescript of August 2, 1872 (Bishops and Regulars), by Retreats of Adoration, and the work of the worship of Jesus Christ"; that is, by work for poor churches, as well as by catechetical instruction to children and to poor or ignorant adults.

Each sister is required to make three adorations in the twenty-four hours, of which two are in the day and one at night. The Divine Office is said in choir. The community is contemplative and cloistered. The initial mother-house was at Angers, France. The congregation's houses at Lyon (France) was founded 29 June 1874; Paris - founded 1 May, 1876; Binche (Belgium) - founded 17 November 1894. In October 1903, at the request of Michel-Thomas Labrecque, a house was established at Chicoutimi on the banks of the Saguenay. The first exposition took place on 22 October 1903, in the chapel of the Sisters of Good Counsel, who for several months extended hospitality to the newly arrived community. On 25 March 1906, it took possession of a new convent and on 18 June 1909 the chapel of the Eucharistic Heart of Jesus was consecrated.
