= Maureen Flood =

Australian religious sister (1935–2005)

Sister Maureen Flood

Personal life
- Born: 22 December 1935 Gunnedah, New South Wales
- Died: 26 December 2005 (aged 70)
- Resting place: Rookwood Cemetery
- Education: University of Sydney (1997)
- Known for: Former deputy superior general of order

Religious life
- Religion: Roman Catholic
- Order: Servants of the Blessed Sacrament
- Initiation: 21 November 1959

Maureen Patricia Brigid Flood (22 December 1935 – 26 December 2005) was an Australian religious sister and member of the Servants of the Blessed Sacrament order. She was the order's regional superior in Australia and deputy superior general. She traveled to Rome, where she created programs for Vatican Radio. She later became interested in feminist theology and worked with Aboriginal community members in Redfern, New South Wales.

== Early life and family ==
Sister Flood was born in Gunnedah, New South Wales. Her mother Cora was an Australian-born Anglican and her father, Ted Flood, was a Roman Catholic from Ireland. Together, then ran country pubs in New South Wales. Flood had four siblings but one died in an accident at the age of four. The family moved from Gunnedah to Inverell and then to Tamworth. Flood's father died at the age of 47 when Flood was aged 16.

Flood suffered from dyslexia at school but went on to become a nurse at St Vincent's Hospital, Sydney.

== Religious life ==
Flood joined the Blessed Sacrament Sisters in Melbourne, a strict, enclosed and contemplative order with a focus on Eucharistic adoration. The Australian foundation of the order was established in 1950, when six Canadian sisters and one Australian (who had taken her novitiate in Quebec) arrived in Melbourne. The date of Flood's religious profession was 21 November 1959.

Flood became the order's regional superior in Australia and the deputy superior general of the Blessed Sacrament Order before travelling to Rome in 1981. She went on to prepare programs for Vatican Radio, including a series on human sexuality, and for the Australian Broadcasting Commission.

After her time in Rome, Flood became increasingly disillusioned with the patriarchal church and began to recognise the limitations of her religious order. She began to take a keen interest in feminism, writing several articles exploring themes of feminist theology and justice. She described herself as "the best possible nun of the worst possible kind."

In 1980, three of the sisters had moved to Sydney to establish a convent in Newtown, where they worked closely with Father Ted Kennedy and the local Indigenous community of Redfern. After Flood returned to Australia in 1987, she joined their work with Aboriginal community members at St Vincent's Catholic Church in Redfern.

She completed a master's degree at the University of Sydney, writing a thesis on spirituality in the poetry of Judith Wright in 1997.

== Death ==
Flood suffered from dementia towards the end of her life, and died just after her 70th birthday on 26 December 2005. She was buried at Rookwood Cemetery. A reflection on her life by Elizabeth Gilroy was published in the Women-Church journal and an obituary by Tony Stephens was published in The Sydney Morning Herald.

== Publications ==
- Flood, Maureen (1999) Presence and Absence in the Poetry of Judith Wright Women-Church: an Australian journal of feminist studies in religion 24 (Apr 1999): 16–20.
- Flood, Maureen (1997) bits of yarn, calico and velvet scraps: a journey through the death of the father Women-Church: an Australian journal of feminist studies in religion 20 (Mar 1997): 30–35.
- Flood, Maureen (1989) Women in the church: aspects of their struggle for justice. Compass Theology Review 23 (Winter/ Spring 1989): 68–75.
- Flood, Maureen P. (1988) What I Learned as a General Councillor in Rome Human Development 9(2): 31–34.
- Flood, Maureen (1978) About Redfern [social work among Aborigines in Sydney] Asian Bureau Australia newsletter 38: 15–16.
