= Eucharistic adoration =

Christian rite

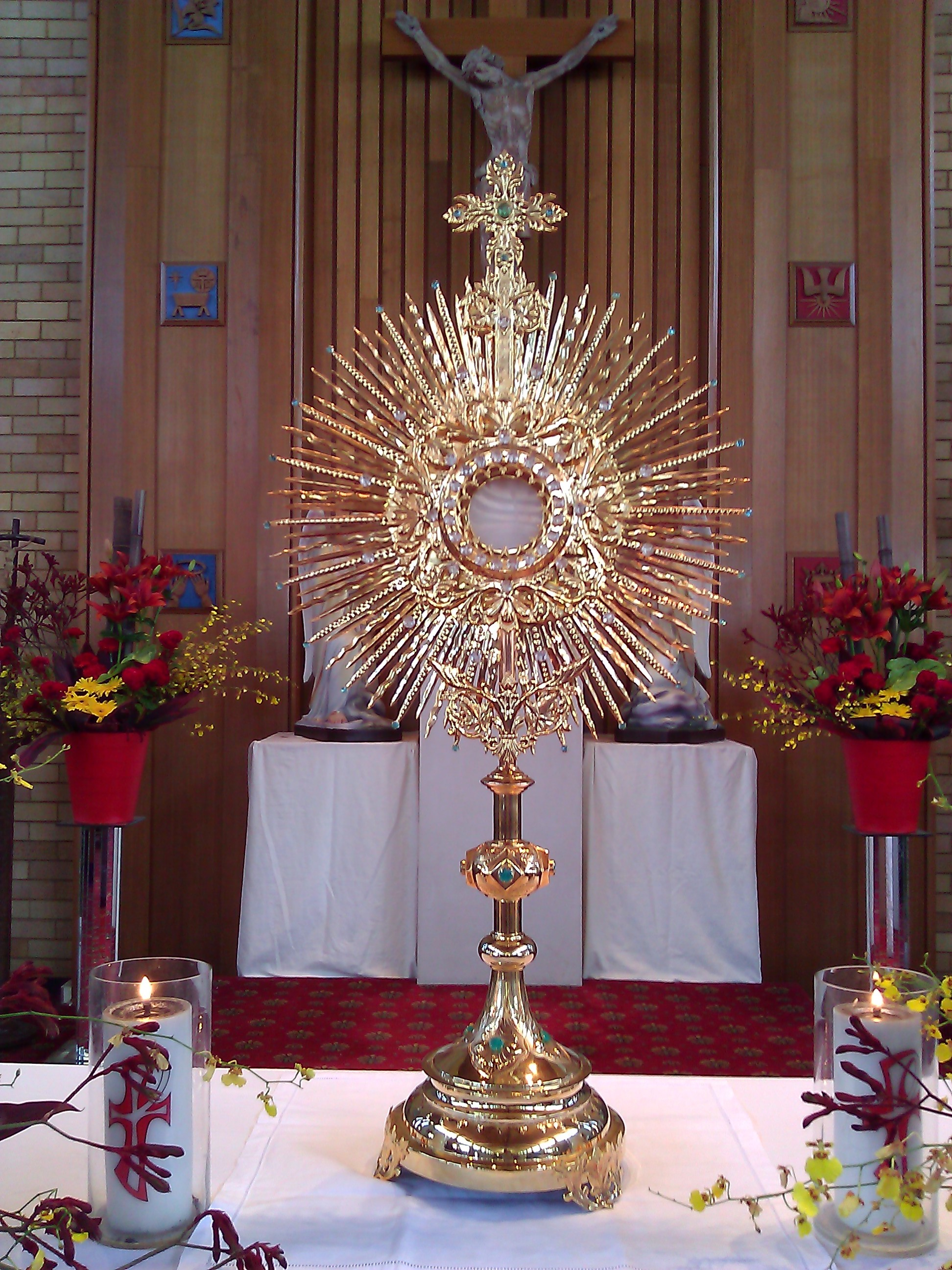
Monstrance at the Eucharistic adoration

Eucharistic adoration is a devotional practice primarily in Western Catholicism and Western Rite Orthodoxy, but also to a lesser extent in certain Lutheran and Anglican traditions, in which the Blessed Sacrament is adored by the faithful. This practice may occur either when the Eucharist is exposed, or when it is not publicly viewable because it is reserved in a place such as a tabernacle.

Adoration is a sign of devotion to and worship of Jesus Christ, who is, according to some Christian traditions, present in body, blood, soul, and divinity, under the appearance of the consecrated host, that is, sacramental bread. From a theological perspective, the adoration is a form of latria, based on the tenet of the real presence of Christ in the Blessed Sacrament.

Christian meditation performed in the presence of the Eucharist outside Mass is called Eucharistic meditation. It has been practised by saints such as Peter Julian Eymard, Jean Vianney and Thérèse of Lisieux. Authors such as Concepción Cabrera de Armida and Maria Candida of the Eucharist have produced writings recording their Eucharistic meditations.

When the exposition and adoration of the Eucharist is constant (twenty-four hours a day), it is called perpetual adoration. In a monastery or convent, it is done by resident monks or nuns and, in a parish, by volunteer parishioners since the 20th century. Pope Benedict XVI instituted perpetual adoration for the laity in each of the five sectors of the Diocese of Rome.

== Practice and context ==
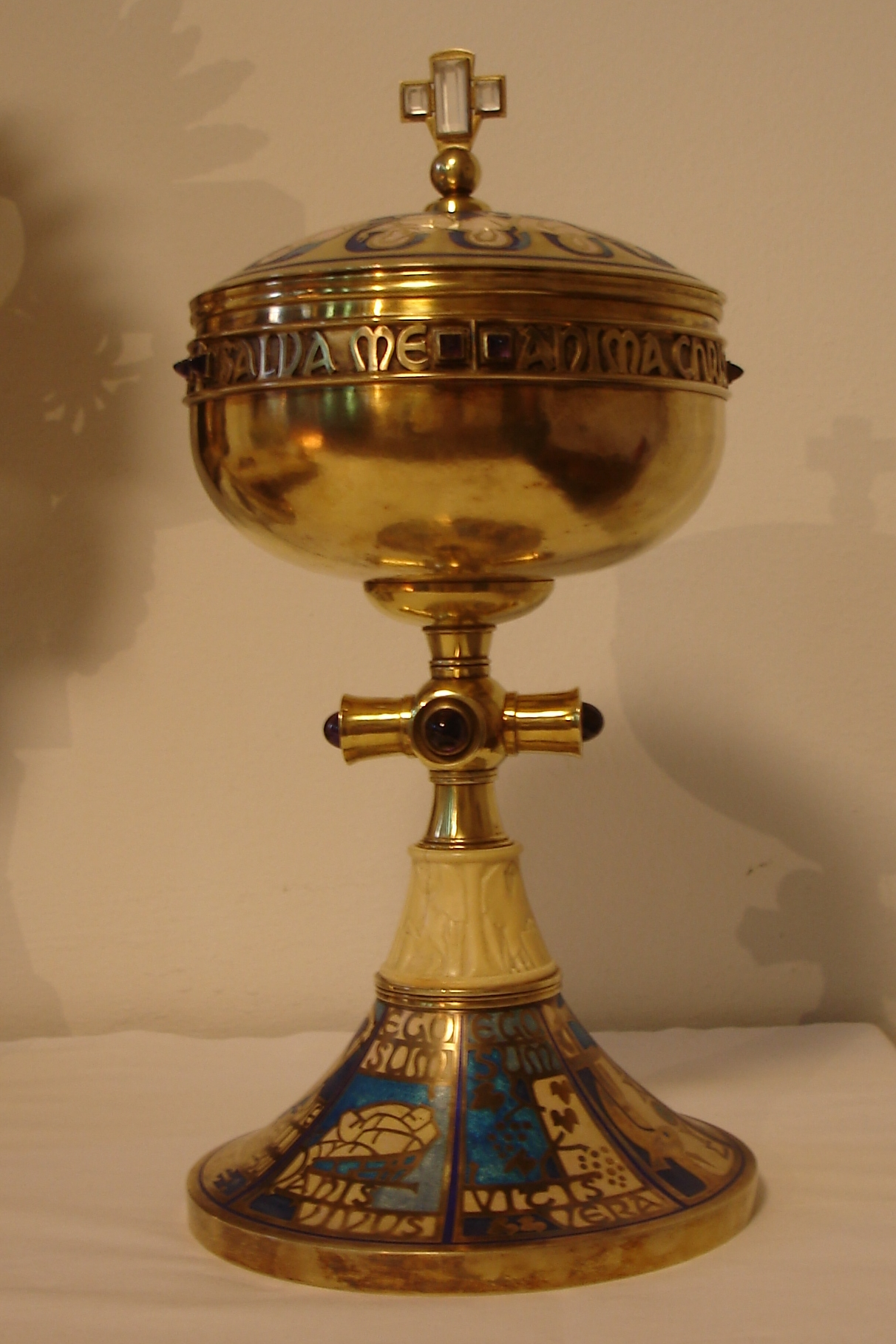
Ciborium, made by the metal and stone sculptor Ernst Hanssen for the St. Francis Church in Hamburg-Barmbek

Eucharistic adoration may be held both when the Eucharist is exposed for viewing and when it is not. It may take place in the context of the liturgical rite of Exposition of the Blessed Sacrament or an informal "visit" to pray before the tabernacle. Writer Valerie Schmalz notes that:

During the first part of the twentieth century, it was common for Catholics, young and old, on their way home from work or school, en route to the grocery store or a sports practice, to "stop in for a visit" to the Blessed Sacrament in their local church. Most times the Eucharist was not exposed, but a red candle – then, as now – showed the Presence in the tabernacle.

Since the Second Vatican Council, the Catholic church has made Eucharistic exposition and benediction a liturgical service in its own right and exercised more direction over its practice; it draws its primary meaning from the Eucharistic celebration itself. The vicariate apostolic of Kuwait describes the purpose of Eucharistic adoration as thus: "By worshiping the Eucharistic Jesus, we become what God wants us to be! Like a magnet, The Lord draws us to Himself and gently transforms us."

At the beginning of the exposition of the Blessed Sacrament, a priest or deacon removes the sacred host from the tabernacle and places it in the monstrance on the altar for adoration by the faithful. A monstrance is the vessel used to display the consecrated Eucharistic Host, during Eucharistic adoration or benediction.

The adoration may also take place when the Eucharist is not exposed but left in a ciborium, which is likewise placed on an altar or in an enclosed tabernacle so that the faithful may pray in its presence without the need for volunteers to be in constant attendance (as is required when the Blessed Sacrament is exposed).

The "Instruction on Eucharistic Worship", issued by the Sacred Congregation of Rites on the Feast of Corpus Christi, 25 May 1967, reads in pertinent part, "The exposition of the Blessed Sacrament, for which either a monstrance or a ciborium may be used, stimulates the faithful to an awareness of the marvelous presence of Christ and is an invitation to spiritual communion with Him. It is therefore an excellent encouragement to offer Him that worship in spirit and truth which is His due."

Speaking to a gathering in Phoenix Park, during a three-day visit to Ireland, from 29 September to 1 October 1979, Pope John Paul II said:

The visit to the Blessed Sacrament is a great treasure of the Catholic faith. It nourishes social love and gives us opportunities for adoration and thanksgiving, for reparation and supplication. Benediction of the Blessed Sacrament, Exposition and Adoration of the Blessed Sacrament, Holy Hours, and Eucharistic processions are likewise precious element of your heritage – in full accord with the teaching of the Second Vatican Council.

As to the manner in which Eucharistic adoration is conducted, the "Instructions" state: "Even brief exposition of the Blessed Sacrament [...] should be so arranged that before the blessing with the Blessed Sacrament reasonable time is provided for readings of the Word of God, hymns, prayers, and silent prayer, as circumstances permit." While psalms, readings and music are part of the liturgical service, in common practice silent contemplation and reflection tend to predominate.

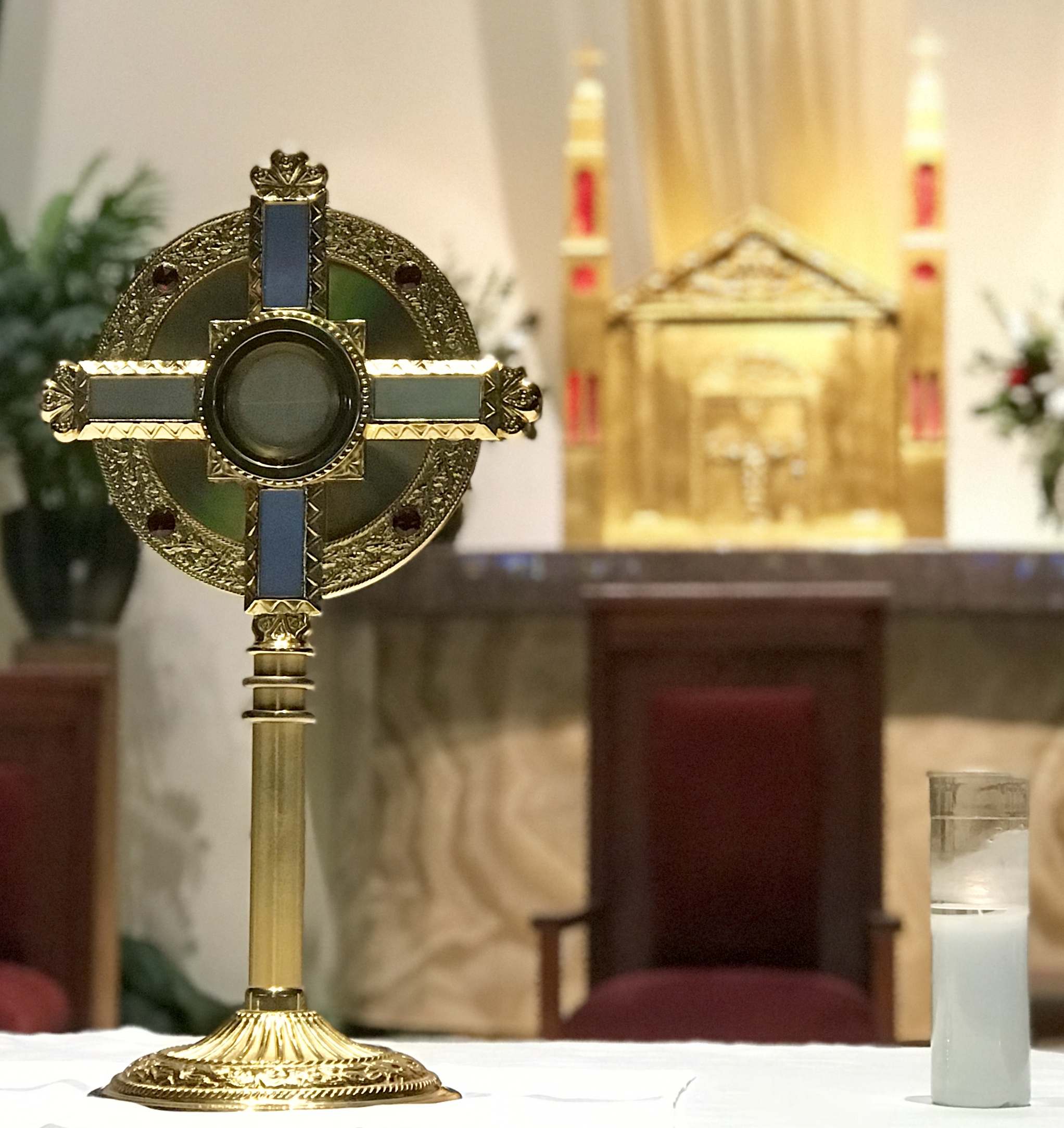
Eucharistic adoration in Saint Therese Little Flower Catholic Church in Reno, Nevada, U.S.

Where Eucharistic adoration is done by an individual for an uninterrupted hour, this is known as a Holy Hour. The inspiration for the Holy Hour is Matthew 26:40, when in the Garden of Gethsemane the night before his crucifixion, Jesus asks Peter: "So, could you not keep watch with me for one hour?".

Some Christian denominations that do not subscribe to transubstantiation consider Eucharistic adoration unfounded and even bordering on idolatry. However, according to the United States Conference of Catholic Bishops, exposition "serves to deepen our hunger for Communion with Christ and the rest of the Church."

== History ==
=== Early history ===
While the keeping of the Blessed Sacrament outside Mass seems to have been part of the Christian practice from the beginning to administer to the sick and dying (both Justin Martyr and Tertullian refer to it), the practice of adoration began somewhat later.

One of the first possible references to reserving the Blessed Sacrament for adoration is found in the life of St. Basil (died AD 379). Basil is said to have divided the Eucharistic bread into three parts when he celebrated the Divine Liturgy in the monastery. One part he consumed, the second part he gave to the monks, and the third he placed in a golden dove-shaped container suspended over the altar. This separate portion was probably to reserve the sacrament for distribution to the sick who were unable to attend the liturgy.

The earliest explicit reference to Eucharistic adoration comes from an eighth century vita of St. Victorian of Asan (d. 558 or 560). According to James Monti: "In a medieval biography of the Italian-born abbot Saint Victorian (+558) written probably in the eighth century, we find what constitutes the earliest extant, explicit account of prayer before the reserved Eucharist outside of Mass. After describing Victorian's devotion in celebrating Mass as a hermit-priest living in northeast Spain (prior to his becoming an abbot sometime between 522 and 531), the biographer tells of a chapel Victorian built adjoining his hermitage, "far off from every loud noise of the world," and how he spent his time there: "In this [chapel], more frequently and fervently, he poured forth his prayers before that indescribable Sacrament of divine goodness and commended to God the health of the whole Church; and in this holy exercise he consumed almost the entire day." This account lends credence to the extraordinary claim of the Spanish city of Lugo that perpetual adoration of the Eucharist has existed in the city since the late sixth century."

Another early example of Eucharistic adoration is in the life of St. Wenceslaus the Martyr (d. 935): "St. Wenceslaus, Duke of Bohemia, although tired with the business of the day, would nevertheless spend whole nights before the tabernacle in supplication for his people… On the coldest winter nights he would arise from his bed in order to visit Our Lord in the Blessed Sacrament; and so inflamed with divine love was his soul that it imparted heat to his very body." According to Alphonsus Liguori: "...tender indeed was the devotion to the Most Blessed Sacrament St. Wenceslaus, Duke of Bohemia. This holy king was so enamored of Jesus there present that he... even during the winter... used to go at night to visit the church in which the Blessed Sacrament was kept."

St. Ulrich of Augsburg is also reported to have practiced adoration in the form of Eucharistic processions: "...the biographer of St. Ulrich (d. 973) speaks of a procession, "hallowed by tradition", with the Eucharist to the church of St. Ambrose, returning to the church of John the Baptist on Easter morning."

Eucharistic adoration in the form of processions, has existed since the 10th century in England and Cluny: "By the tenth century, a solem procession for bringing the Eucharist to the sick and the dying had emerged in the monasteries: the tenth-century Regularis concordia, a directory for England's monasteries attributed to Saint Æthelwold of Winchester (d. 984), speaks of the Blessed Sacrament being carried with incense in procession to the rooms of ill monks. The French Benedictine customary of Cluny known as the Liber tramitis (c. 1043) directs that when the priest carrying the Viaticum enters the home of the invalid, all present should kneel before "the Body of the Lord", including the invalid himself, if he is able to do so."

Eucharistic adoration has also been reported, by some authors, among the saints of the British Isles: "Of this devotion Fr. Bridgett gives a long list of saintly examples – Cuthbert, and Guthlac and Ulfric, Herbert and Godric, and besides them many holy women." According to Lawrence George Lovasik: "The Anglo-Saxons gave the highest worship to that which the ciborium or pyx contained. They called it "the adorable Host of the Son of God." They gave every sign of outward reverence to the church that contained it and to the altar on which it was offered."

In Eastern Christianity, the adoration which developed in the West has never been part of the Eastern liturgy which St. Basil celebrated, but a liturgy for adoration does exist among the Eastern Catholic Churches involving psalms and placing a covered diskos with the sacred species on the altar. This is befitting the Eastern custom of veiling from human eyes those things deemed sacred.

=== Middle Ages ===
The theological basis for the adoration was prepared in the 11th century by Pope Gregory VII, who was instrumental in affirming the tenet that Christ is present in the Blessed Host. In 1079, Gregory required of Berengar of Tours a confession of belief:

I believe in my heart and openly profess that the bread and wine that are placed on the altar are, through the mystery of the sacred prayer and the words of the Redeemer, substantially changed into the true and proper and lifegiving flesh and blood of Jesus Christ our Lord, and that after the consecration they are the true body of Christ[.]

— Mysterium Fidei, §52

This profession of faith began a "Eucharistic Renaissance" in the churches of Europe. Lanfranc of Canterbury started the tradition of Eucharistic processions during the Liturgy in Canterbury cathedral, and the people would bow in adoration of the Sacrament. The Franciscan archives credit Saint Francis of Assisi (who died in 1226) for starting Eucharistic Adoration in Italy. It then spread from Umbria to other parts of Italy.

In 1264 Pope Urban IV instituted the feast of Corpus Christi ("the Body of Christ") with the publication of the papal bull Transiturus. He asked the Dominican theologian Thomas Aquinas to write the texts for the Mass and Office of the feast. This included such famous hymns as Panis angelicus and Verbum Supernum Prodiens, the last two strophes of which form the Benediction hymn O Salutaris Hostia. The last two verses of Pange Lingua are sung as the hymn Tantum Ergo, also used at Benediction.

Beginning in the 14th century in the Western Church, devotions began to focus on the Eucharistic gifts as the objective presence of the risen Christ and the Host began to be elevated during the liturgy for the purpose of adoration, as well as to be seen by the congregation since the priest stood facing the same direction in front of the altar.

=== 16th–18th centuries ===
In the 16th century, the Protestant Reformation was challenging various issues with respect to the Eucharist and in response the Council of Trent greatly emphasized the presence of Christ in the Eucharist, the theological basis for Eucharistic adoration. The Trent declaration was the most significant theological component of Eucharistic doctrine since the apostolic age. The statement included the following:

The other sacraments do not have the power of sanctifying until someone makes use of them, but in the Eucharist the very Author of sanctity is present before the Sacrament is used. For before the apostles received the Eucharist from the hands of our Lord, He told them that it was His Body that He was giving them.

The Council then declared Eucharistic adoration as a form of latria:

The only-begotten Son of God is to be adored in the Holy Sacrament of the Eucharist with the worship of "latria", including external worship. The Sacrament, therefore, is to be honored with extraordinary festive celebrations (and) solemnly carried from place to place in processions according to the praiseworthy universal rite and custom of the holy Church. The Sacrament is to be publicly exposed for the people's adoration.

Following the Council of Trent, figures such as Saints Charles Borromeo and Alain de Solminihac promoted Eucharistic devotion and adoration. As part of the simplification of Church interiors, and to emphasize the importance of the Blessed Sacrament, Charles Borromeo initiated the practice of placing the tabernacle at a higher, central location behind the main altar. As Eucharistic adoration and Benediction became more widespread during the 17th century, the altar came to be seen as the "home of the Blessed Sacrament" where it would be adored.

A common early practice of adoration known as Quarantore (literary 'forty hours') started in the 16th century. It is an exercise of devotion in which continuous prayer is made for forty hours before the exposed Blessed Sacrament. This practice started in Milan in the 1530s and 1540s by Capuchins such as Giuseppe da Fermo who promoted long periods of adoration. From Northern Italy it was carried to elsewhere in Europe by the Capuchins and Jesuits.

The practice of the perpetual adoration of the Blessed Sacrament started in Naples in 1590 within the Order of the Clerics Regular Minor, founded by Francis Caracciolo, Fr. Augustine Adorno and Fr. Fabrizio Caracciolo. This practice was modified to continuous adoration during the day due to the few number of religious in the Order's Constitutions of 1597 with approval by Pope Clement VIII At a later date, the Order would revert to its earlier rule of perpetual adoration, but only within houses of no less than twenty religious. The houses with less religious were offered perpetual adoration as an option if it would not interfere with the execution of the house's ministries.

In the 18th century, large numbers of people were drawn to quiet adoration of the Eucharist and priests such as Alphonsus Liguori encouraged the practice. He wrote a book entitled Visits to the Blessed Sacrament and explained that a visit to the Blessed Sacrament is the "practice of loving Jesus Christ", since friends who love each other visit regularly. Benedict Joseph Labre, a homeless beggar and Franciscan tertiary, was a familiar figure in the city of Rome and known as the "saint of the Forty Hours" (or Quarant' Ore) for his dedication to Eucharistic adoration.

=== 19th and 20th centuries ===
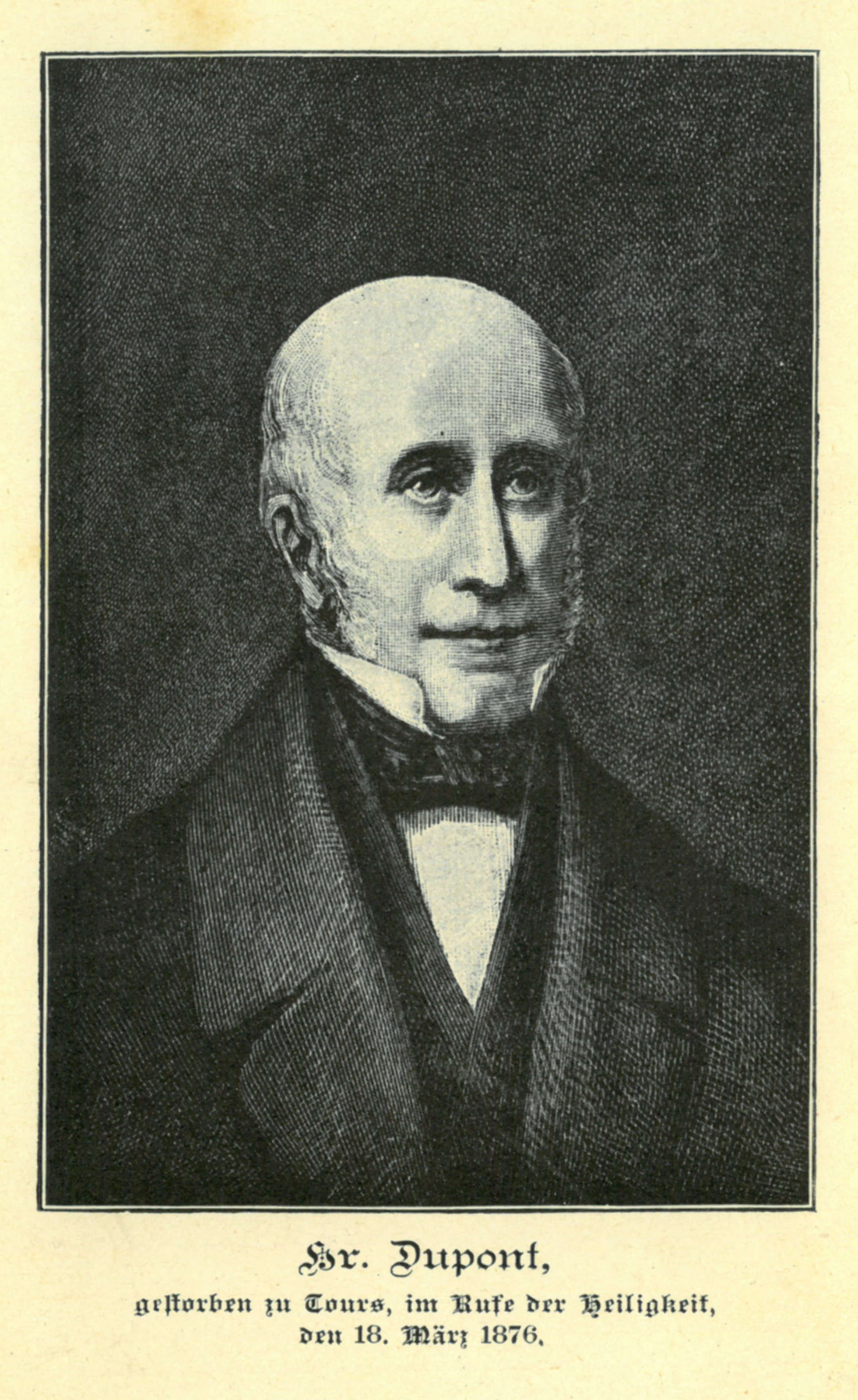
The Venerable Leo Dupont

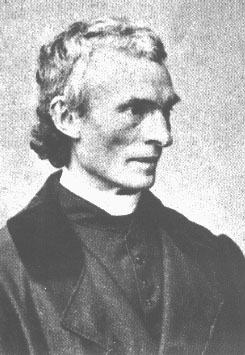
St. Peter Julian Eymard

The French Revolution hindered the practice of Eucharistic adoration; however, the beginning of the 19th century witnessed a strong emphasis on Eucharistic piety, devotions and adorations. By 1829, the efforts of the Confraternity of Penitents-Gris brought Eucharistic adoration back in France. Twenty years later, the Venerable Leo Dupont initiated the nightly adoration of the Blessed Sacrament in Tours in 1849, from where it spread within France. Anthony Mary Claret, the confessor to Isabella II of Spain and the founder of the Claretians, was also a fervent promoter of Eucharistic devotion and adoration and introduced the practice to Cuba, where he was sent as Archbishop.

The adoration of the Eucharist within France grew in this period, and there were interactions between Catholic figures who were enthusiastic about spreading the practice, e.g., Leo Dupont, Jean Vianney and Peter Julian Eymard who in 1858 formed the Congregation of the Blessed Sacrament.

Also in 1858, Eymard, known as the Apostle of the Eucharist, and sister Marguerite Guillot formed the Servants of the Blessed Sacrament which now maintains houses on several continents where continuous Eucharistic adoration takes place.

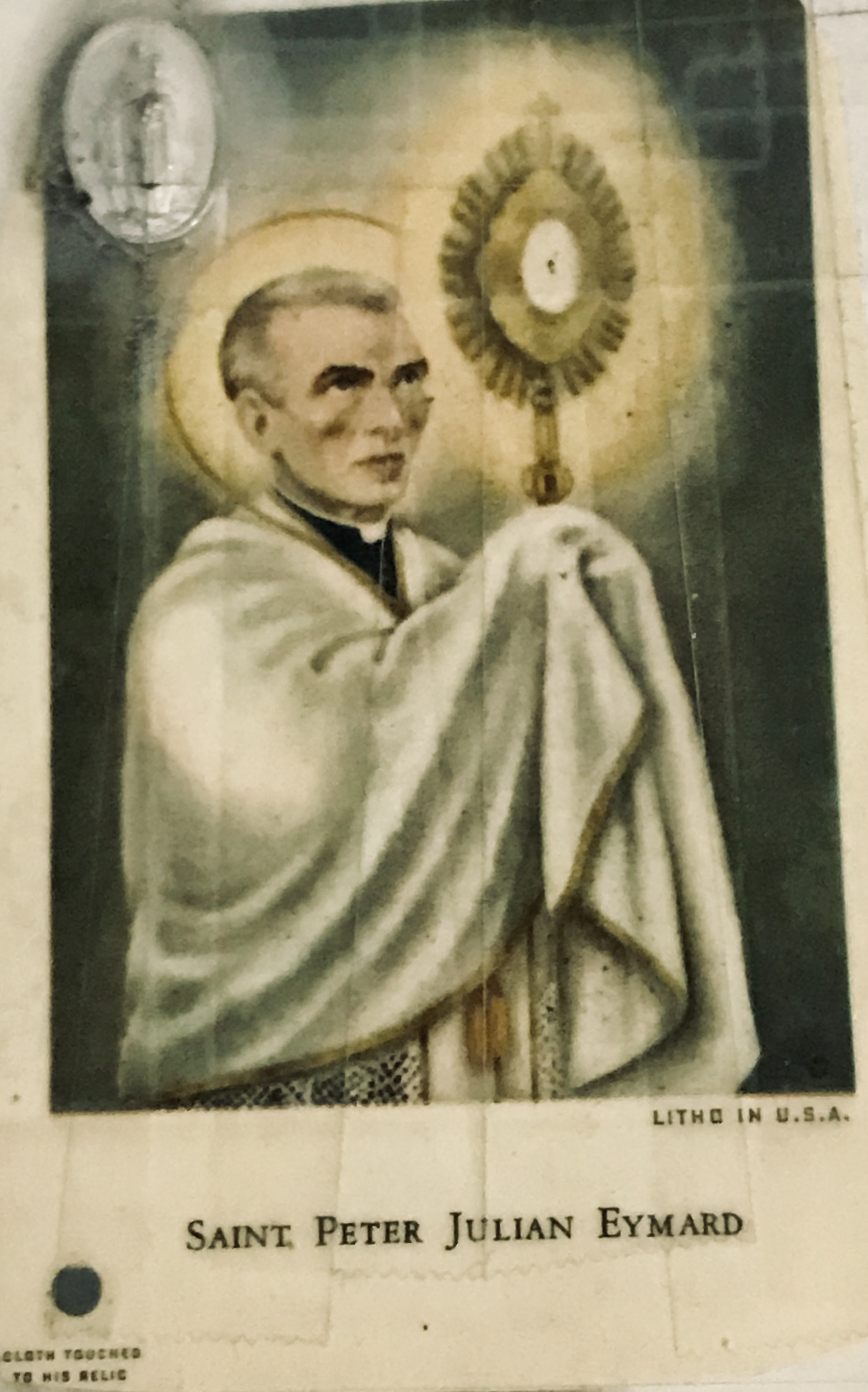
Peter Julian Eymard

By Decree of the Congregation for the Sacraments and Divine Worship, dated 9 December 1995, Saint Peter Julian Eymard, Priest, was added to the General Roman Calendar with the rank of optional memorial:

Font and fullness of all evangelization and striking expression of the infinite love of our divine Redeemer for mankind, the Holy Eucharist clearly marked the life and pastoral activity of Peter Julian Eymard. He truly deserves to be called an outstanding apostle of the Eucharist. In fact, his mission in the Church consisted in promoting the centrality of the Eucharistic Mystery in the whole life of the Christian community.

The first informally organized Eucharistic Congress took place in 1874, through the efforts of Marie-Marthe-Baptistine Tamisier of Tours, France. In 1881, Pope Leo XIII approved the first formal Eucharistic Congress, which was organized by Louis-Gaston de Ségur in Lille, France, and was attended by a few adherents. The 1905 congress took place in Rome, and Pope Pius X presided over it.

The practice of prolonged Eucharistic adoration also spread to the United States in the 19th century, and John Neumann, the Bishop of Philadelphia, started the Forty Hours' Devotion there.

== Christian traditions ==
=== Catholics ===
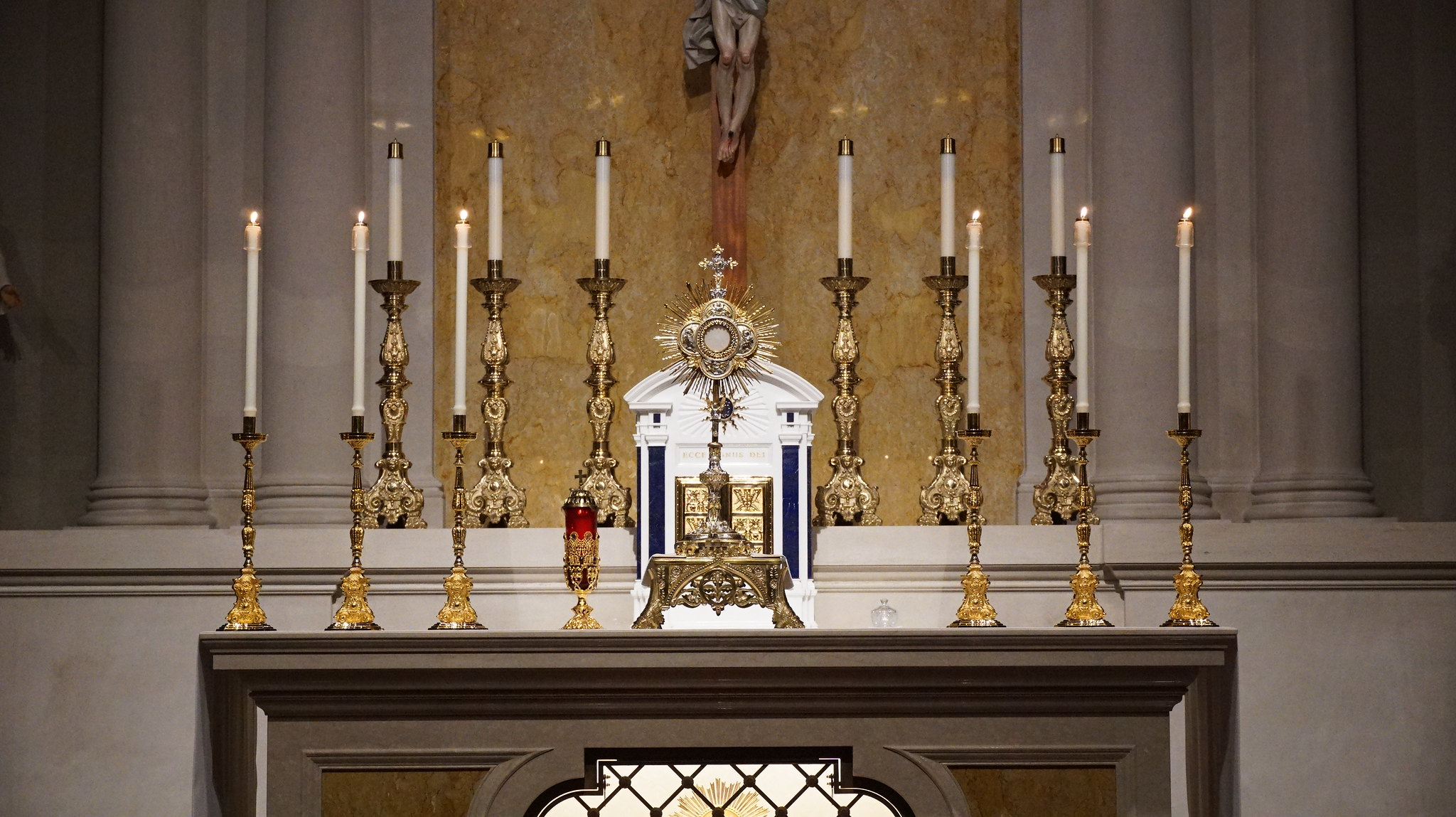
Adoration in St. Catherine of Siena Church, Trumbull, Connecticut

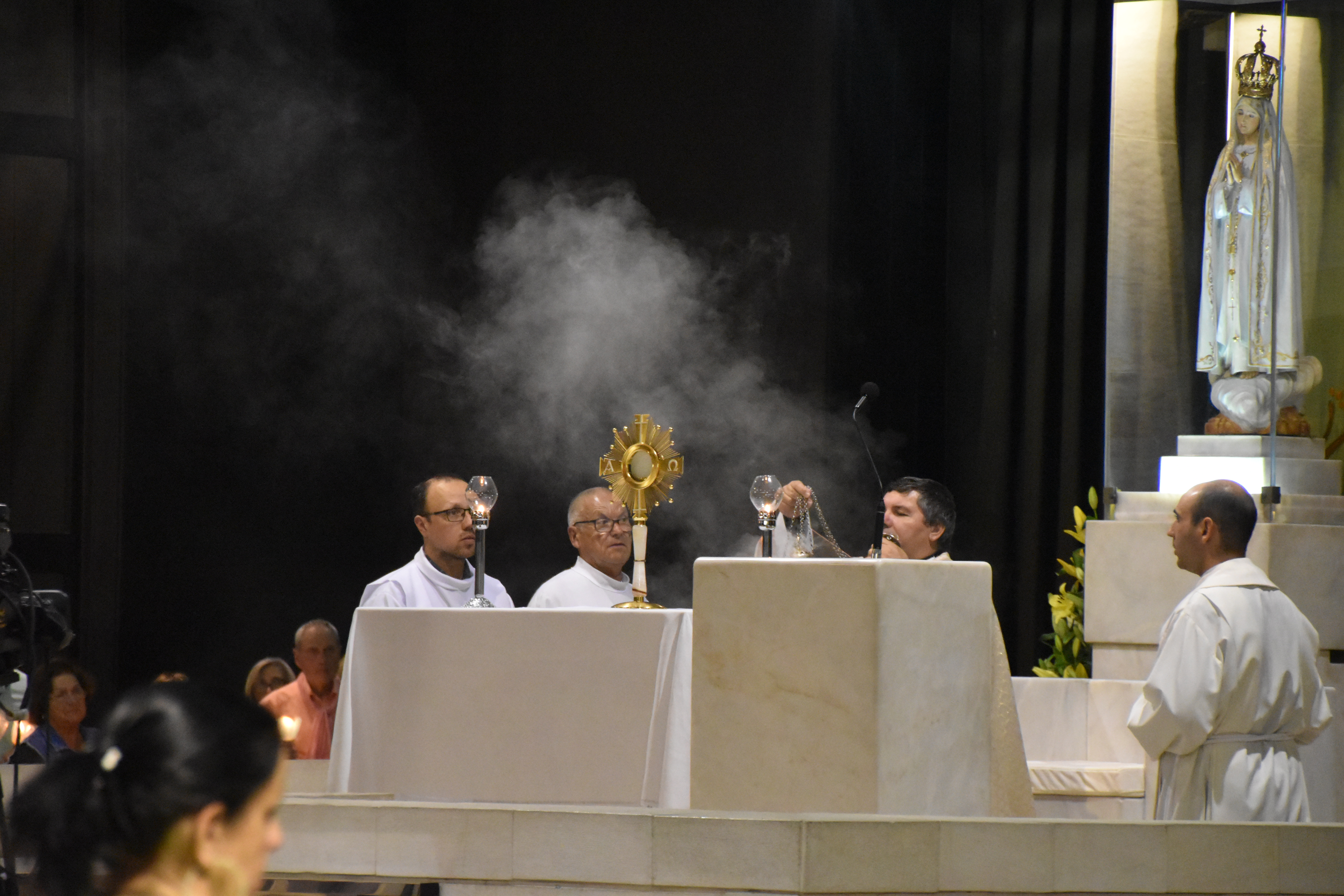
Eucharistic adoration in the Chapel of the Apparitions of the Sanctuary of Our Lady of Fátima in Portugal

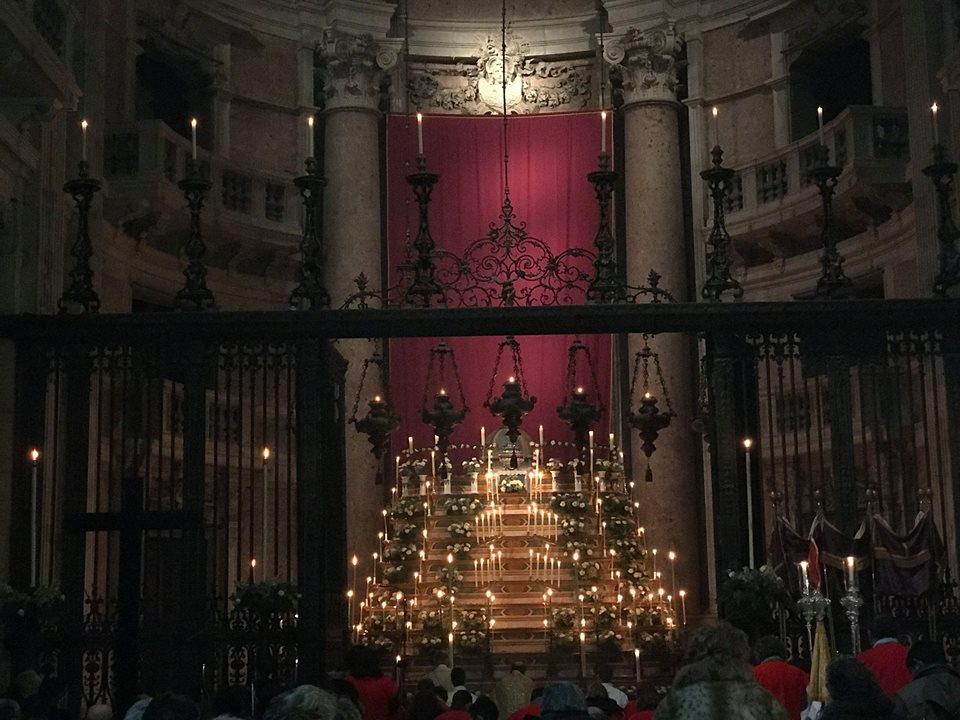
An altar of repose for eucharistic adoration in the Royal Basilica of Mafra, Portugal, on Maundy Thursday – Royal and Venerable Confraternity of the Most Blessed Sacrament of Mafra

Catholic doctrine holds that at the moment of consecration the elements of bread and wine are changed (substantially) into the body, blood, soul and divinity of Christ while the appearances (the "accidents") of the bread and wine remain. In the doctrine of Real Presence, at the point of consecration, the act that takes place is a double miracle: 1) that Jesus Christ is present in the Eucharist in a true, real and substantial way, with his body and his blood, with his soul and his divinity; and 2) that the bread and wine have truly, substantially become Jesus' body and blood. Because Catholics believe that Christ is truly present (body, blood, soul and divinity) in the Eucharist, the reserved sacrament serves as a focal point of adoration. The Catechism of the Catholic Church states that: "The Eucharistic presence of Christ begins at the moment of the consecration and endures as long as the Eucharistic species subsist."

The practice of adoration itself developed in a climate of Protestantism, and specifically the rejection of the doctrine of the real presence among certain groups. As such, some Catholic leaders began to institute the practice of adoration in order to inspire confidence among the faithful in Catholic Eucharistic doctrine. It became a staple of the Western Church thereafter.

Faustina Kowalska stated that she was called to religious life while attending the Exposition of the Blessed Sacrament at age seven.

The practice of a "daily Holy Hour" of adoration has been encouraged in the Western Catholic tradition. Mother Teresa of Calcutta had a Holy Hour each day and all members of her Missionaries of Charity followed her example.

Since the Middle Ages the practice of Eucharistic adoration outside Mass has been encouraged by the popes.

In the midst of the Second Vatican Council, on 3 September 1965, a few days before opening the fourth session, Pope Paul VI issued the Encyclical Mysterium fidei whereby he urged daily Mass and communion and said, "And they should not forget about paying a visit during the day to the Most Blessed Sacrament in the very special place of honor where it is reserved in churches in keeping with the liturgical laws, since this is a proof of gratitude and a pledge of love and a display of the adoration that is owed to Christ the Lord who is present there." Pius X also said: "The daily adoration or visit to the Blessed Sacrament is the practice which is the fountainhead of all devotional works."

In Dominicae Cenae, Pope John Paul II stated: "The Church and the world have a great need of Eucharistic worship. Jesus waits for us in this sacrament of love. Let us be generous with our time in going to meet Him in adoration and in contemplation that is full of faith." He added in Ecclesia de Eucharistia: "The worship of the Eucharist outside of the Mass is of inestimable value for the life of the Church [...] It is the responsibility of Pastors to encourage, also by their personal witness, the practice of Eucharistic adoration, and exposition of the Blessed Sacrament."

From his early years, the Eucharist had a central place in the theology of Joseph Ratzinger and in his role as Pope Benedict XVI. In his book God Is Near Us: The Eucharist, the Heart of Life he strongly encouraged Eucharistic adoration.

==== Eastern Catholics ====
Generally speaking, Eastern Catholics do not practice adoration, as the circumstances which brought about the practice in the Western Church were not acutely present in the East.

Even so, Latinization, biritualism, and other factors have caused some Eastern Catholic parishes and communities to embrace the practice nevertheless. Among these, certain Churches of Ruthenian liturgical heritage have at times observed a paraliturgical service of supplication and adoration (Supplicatsia), which was often conjoined with the moleben service, which continues to be maintained in some places.

==== Catholic prayers to the Blessed Sacrament ====
One of the better known prayers of reparation to the Blessed Sacrament is attributed to the Angel of Portugal, said to have appeared at Fatima:

O most Holy Trinity, Father, Son, and Holy Spirit, I adore You profoundly. I offer You the Most Precious Body, Blood, Soul and Divinity of Jesus Christ, present in all the tabernacles of the world, in reparation for the outrages, sacrileges and indifferences by which He is offended. By the infinite merits of the Sacred Heart of Jesus and the Immaculate Heart of Mary, I beg the conversion of sinners.

A prayer devised by John Henry Newman for a short visit to the Blessed Sacrament reads:

I place myself in the presence of Him, in whose Incarnate Presence I am before I place myself there.

I adore You, O my Savior, present here as God and Man, in Soul and Body, in true Flesh and Blood.

I acknowledge and confess that I kneel before the Sacred Humanity, which was conceived in Mary's womb, and lay in Mary's bosom; which grew up to man's estate, and by the Sea of Galilee called the Twelve, wrought miracles, and spoke words of wisdom and peace; which in due season hung on the cross, lay in the tomb, rose from the dead, and now reigns in heaven.

I praise and bless, and give myself wholly to Him, Who is the true Bread of my soul, and my everlasting joy.

=== Eastern Orthodox ===
==== Russian Orthodox prayers to the Blessed Sacrament ====
The only known, extant, example of prayers to the Blessed Sacrament in the Russian Orthodox tradition is a devotion entitled Worship of the Most Pure Mysteries of Christ, written by St. Demetrius of Rostov (1651–1709).

=== Lutherans ===
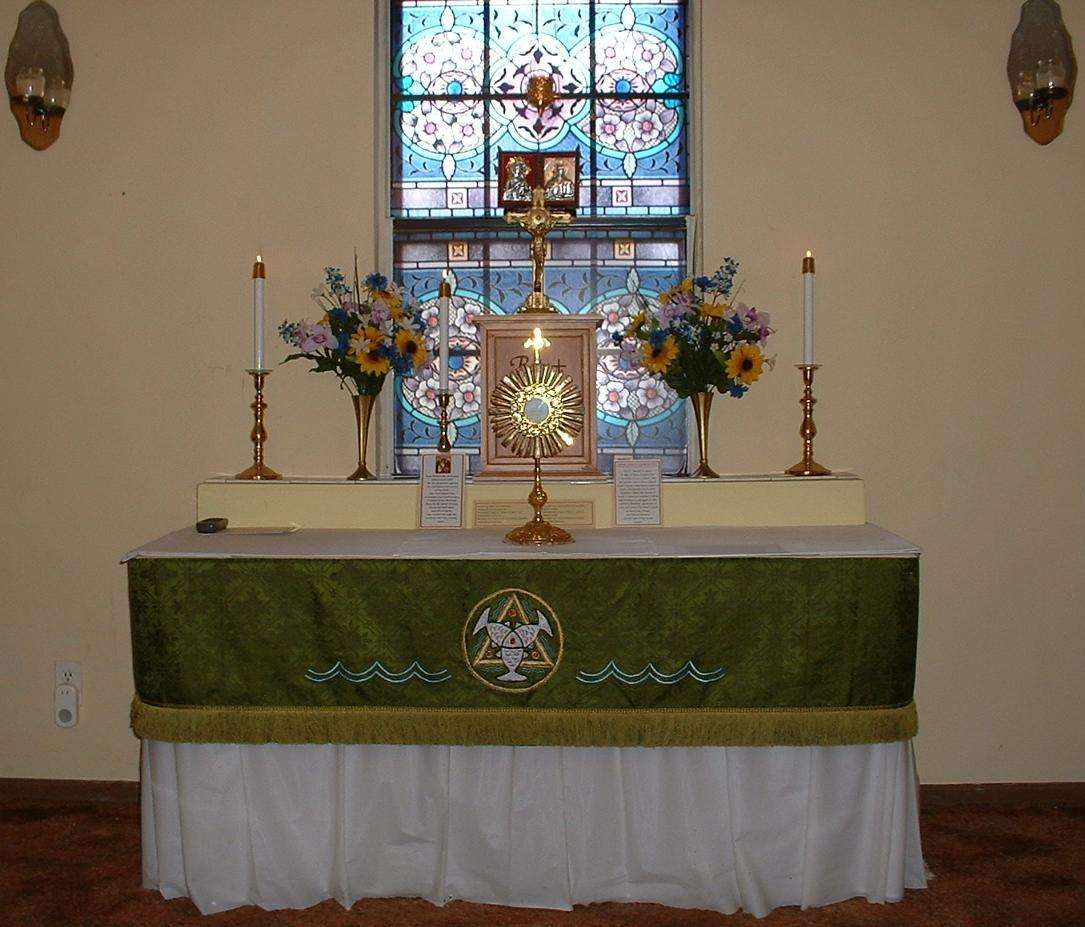
Adoration at a High Lutheran church in Kansas City, Missouri

In Lutheranism, if the holy elements are not consumed at the altar or after the service, then they can be set aside and placed in an aumbry, which is normally located in the sacristy. Primarily, the extra hosts are reserved for another Eucharist or for taking to the sick and those too feeble to attend a church service. However, certain Lutheran parishes reserve the Eucharist in a tabernacle near the altar.

Historically in Lutheranism there have been two parties regarding Eucharistic adoration: Gnesio-Lutherans, who followed Martin Luther's view in favor of adoration, and Philippists who followed Philipp Melanchthon's view against it. Martin Luther wrote a treatise titled The Adoration of the Sacrament (1523) where he defended the practice of Eucharistic adoration. In his reform of the Roman Mass Luther placed the Sanctus after the Institution Narrative to serve as a solemn act of worship of the real Presence just brought about by the latter. This order is still maintained in some Lutheran liturgies, such as that of the noticeably high church Church of Sweden. After the death of Martin Luther, further controversies developed including Crypto-Calvinism and the second Sacramentarian controversy, started by Gnesio-Lutheran Joachim Westphal. The Philippist understanding of the real presence without overt adoration through time became widespread in Lutheranism, although it is not in accordance with Luther's teaching. The German theologian Andreas Musculus can be regarded as one of the warmest defenders of Eucharistic adoration in early Lutheranism. The Feast of Corpus Christi was celebrated by Lutherans in Dessau (1532), Brandenburg (1540), and Brandenburg-Ansbach-Kulmbach (1548).

Certain Lutheran parishes of Evangelical Catholic churchmanship practice Eucharistic adoration, along with observing the Feast of Corpus Christi.

=== Anglicans ===
Early Anglicanism officially rejected Eucharistic adoration. Article XXVIII – Of the Lord's Supper in Anglicanism's 39 Articles rejects transubstantiation, declaring that "Transubstantiation (or the change of the substance of Bread and Wine) in the Supper of the Lord, cannot be proved by Holy Writ; but is repugnant to the plain words of Scripture, overthroweth the nature of a Sacrament, and hath given occasion to many superstitions." The Article also states that "The Sacrament of the Lord's Supper was not by Christ's ordinance reserved, carried about, lifted up, or worshiped."

However, since the mid-19th century, the Oxford Movement has broadened Anglican opinions on the matter. An early 20th century bishop, the Right Reverend Edgar Gibson, Bishop of Gloucester, wrote of Article 28 that "The statement in the Article is worded with the utmost care, and with studied moderation. It cannot be said that any one of the practices is condemned or prohibited by it. It only amounts to this: that none of them can claim to be part of the original Divine institution."

Some Anglo-Catholics celebrate Benediction of the Blessed Sacrament, which is not unlike Eucharistic adoration.

== Eucharistic meditation ==
Apart from promoting the Eucharist, Peter Julian Eymard also made meditations before the Blessed host and his writings were later published as a book: The Real Presence. His contemporary Jean Vianney also performed Eucharistic meditations which were later published.

Thérèse of Lisieux was devoted to Eucharistic meditation and on 26 February 1895 shortly before she died wrote from memory her poem "To Live by Love", which she had composed during Eucharistic meditation. During her life, the poem was sent to various religious communities and was included in a notebook of her poems.

Significant portions of the writings of Concepcion Cabrera de Armida were reported as having been based on her meditations during adoration of the Blessed Sacrament.

In her book The Eucharist: true jewel of eucharistic spirituality, Maria Candida of the Eucharist (who was beatified by Pope John Paul II) wrote about her own personal experiences and reflections on Eucharistic meditation.

== Perpetual adoration ==
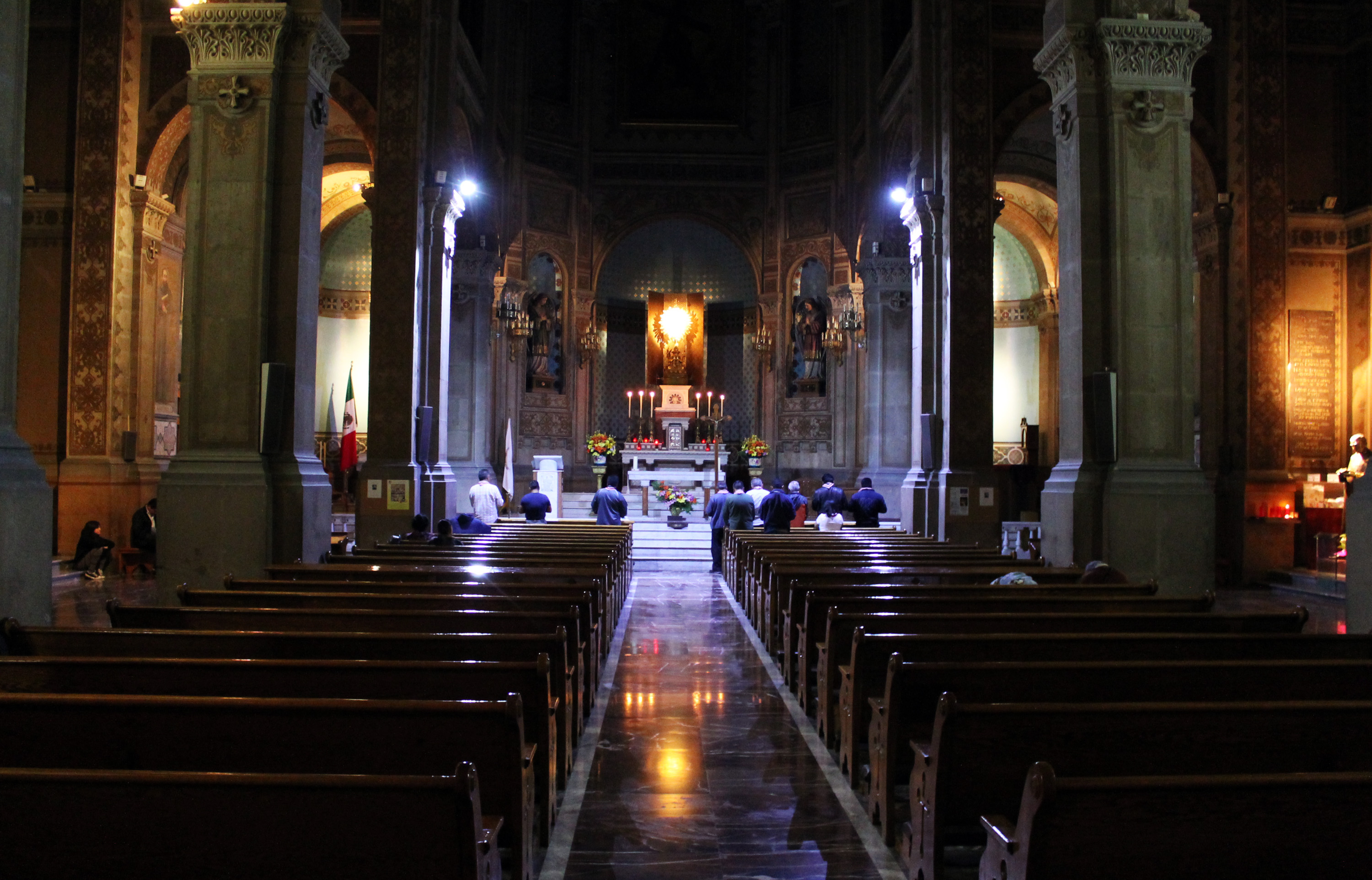
Perpetual adoration at the National Expiatory Temple of San Felipe de Jesús, Mexico City

Perpetual adoration is the practice of the continuous exposition and adoration of the Eucharist, twenty-four hours a day. Similar to the "Perpetual Rosary" in which the rosary is recited uninterrupted by a changing group of people, this practice gained popularity among Western (or "Roman") Catholics in 19th-century France and has since spread to lay Catholics in parishes across the world.

During perpetual adoration, a specific person performs adoration for a period of one hour or more, so there is always at least one person who performs adoration during each day and night. However, during Mass the Blessed Sacrament is reposed and is then exposed again after Mass.

=== Early traditions ===
Perpetual adoration of God by psalm and prayer has been a tradition among Christians since ancient times, e.g., in Eastern Christianity since the year 400 when the Acoemetae monks kept up a divine service day and night; and in Western Christianity the monks at the monastery of Agaunum performed perpetual prayers since its formation in 522 by King Sigismund.

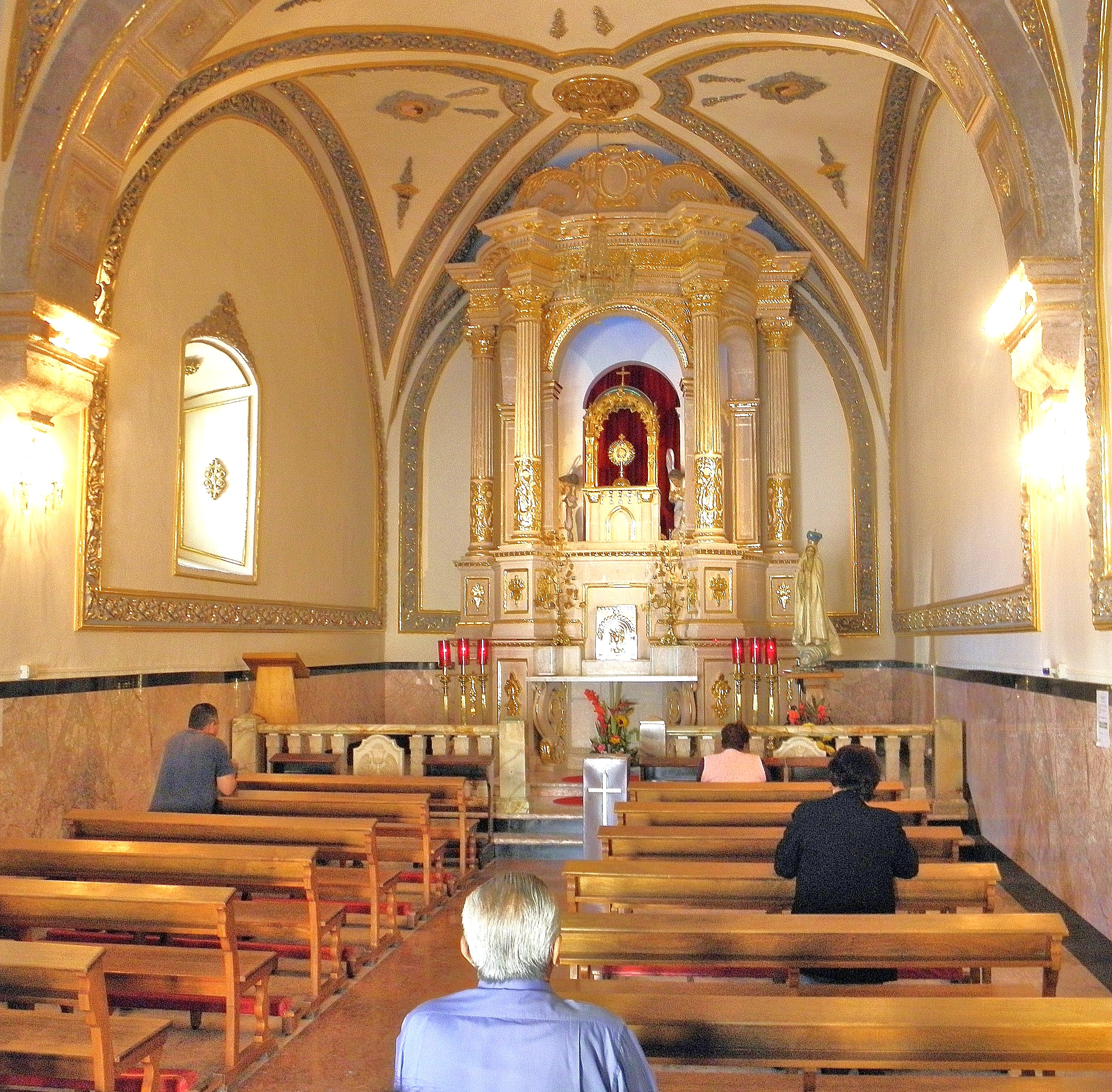
Perpetual adoration at the Cathedral of Chihuahua, Mexico

The first recorded instance of perpetual adoration formally began in Avignon, France, on 11 September 1226. To celebrate and give thanks for the victory over the Albigensians in the Siege of Avignon, King Louis VIII asked that the sacrament be placed on display at the Chapel of the Holy Cross.

On 25 March 1654 Mother Mechtilde of the Blessed Sacrament formed a Benedictine society formed for that purpose. Mother Mechtilde pioneered perpetual adoration of the Eucharist on request of Père Picotte. Père Picotte was the confessor of Anne of Austria who asked him for a vow for the deliverance of France from war and the order was formed in response to that vow. A small house was bought on Rue Feron in Paris and a Benedictine convent, founded for this purpose, began perpetual adoration there on 25 March 1654, one or more nuns kneeling in front of the altar in adoration each hour of the day and night. The simple Benedictine rules with which the nuns started were amended and formal approval for perpetual adoration was provided by the Camera Apostolica in Rome in 1705.

By the beginning of the 19th century, in France as well as elsewhere in Europe, strong currents in favor of Eucharistic piety, devotions and adoration began to appear. Preachers such as Prosper Guéranger, Peter Julian Eymard and Jean Vianney were very effective in renewing such devotions.

The Poor Clares of the Monastery of Saint Mary of the Angels of Perpetual Adoration, in Drumshanbo, Ireland, first established perpetual adoration on 25 March 1870, and have continued the practice uninterrupted to this day. The Franciscan Sisters of Perpetual Adoration have been praying nonstop longer than anyone in the United States; the practice began on 1 August 1878, at 11 a.m. and officially ended on Ash Wednesday, February 26, 2020. At this point the perpetual prayer had been maintained without interruption for 141 years.

=== 20th and 21st centuries ===
In the 20th century, the practice of perpetual adoration spread from monasteries and convents to Catholic parishes at large, and is now also performed by lay Catholics. The perpetual adoration chapel in Saint Peter's Basilica was inaugurated by Pope John Paul II in 1981 and a number of the major basilicas in Rome have also started perpetual adoration in the 20th century.

At the beginning of the 21st century, there were over 2,500 perpetual adoration chapels in Catholic parishes around the world. The United States (with about 70 million Catholics) had about 1,100 chapels, the Philippines (with about 80 million Catholics) 500, the Republic of Ireland (with about 4 million Catholics) about 150, South Korea (with about 4 million Catholics) had about 70.

As of 2005, the Archdiocese of Saint Paul and Minneapolis was estimated to have the most chapels of perpetual adoration of any archdiocese in the United States. As of 2008, the world's largest monstrance is in Chicago, in a perpetual adoration chapel dedicated to the Divine Mercy, and is adjacent to Church of St. Stanislaus Kostka, one of the city's Polish churches.

== See also ==
- Fermentum
- First Thursdays Devotion
- "I Am": Eucharistic Meditations on the Gospel
- Showbread
- Seven Churches Visitation
