= Congregation of the Blessed Sacrament =

Clerical Religious Institute of Pontifical Right compose of priest, deacons & brothers

Congregation of The Blessed Sacrament
- Congregatio Sanctissimi Sacramenti (Latin)
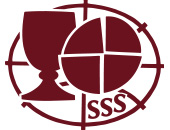
- Emblem of the Sacramentinos
- Abbreviation: Post-nominal letters: S.S.S.
- Formation: 13 May 1856; 170 years ago
- Founder: Pierre-Julien Eymard
- Founded at: Paris, France
- Type: Clerical Religious Congregation of Pontifical Right (for Men)
- Purpose: To live the mystery of the Eucharist fully and to make known its meaning, so that Christ's reign may come to the glory of God and be revealed to the world.
- Headquarters: Mother house Via G. B. De Rossi 46, 00161 Rome, Italy
- Coordinates: 41°55′02.4″N 12°31′07.2″E
- Members: 883 members (includes 591 priests) as of 2020
- Motto: Latin: Adveniat Regnum Tuum Eucharisticum; English: Thy Eucharistic Kingdom Come
- Superior General: Philip Benzy Romician
- Ministry: Eucharistic apostolate
- Nickname: Sacramentino
- Main organ: Emmanuel (English)
- Parent organization: Catholic Church
- Website: www.ssscongregatio.org

The Congregation of the Blessed Sacrament (Latin: Congregatio Sanctissimi Sacramenti), commonly known as the Sacramentinos, is a Catholic clerical religious congregation of pontifical right for men, founded by Peter Julian Eymard. Its members use the postnominal letters S.S.S. They assist the Catholic Church in its efforts to form Christian communities whose center of life is the Eucharist. They commit themselves to the implementation of this ideal in collaboration with lay men and women engaged in various ministries.

== History ==
The Congregation of the Blessed Sacrament was founded in Paris France on 13 May 1856 by a French priest, Peter Julian Eymard. As he searched for a response to the needs and challenges of his time, he found the answer in the love of God manifested in a special way in the Eucharist. During Eymard's lifetime, the character of French Catholicism was changing from a religion of guilt and fear to a religion based on God's mercy and love. Eymard was a leading figure in this transition.

== Founder – Peter Julian Eymard ==
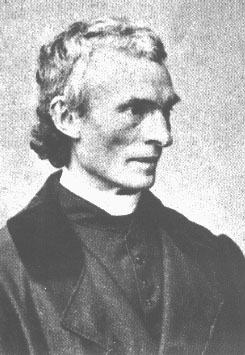
Peter Julian Eymard

Eymard was born 4 February 1811 in La Mure, Isère, France. He was a contemporary and friend of Peter Chanel, John Vianney, Marcellin Champagnat, and the sculptor, Auguste Rodin. On 20 July 1834 Eymard was ordained a priest for the Diocese of Grenoble, and in 1839 he joined the Marist Fathers. He worked with the Third Order of Mary and other lay organizations promoting devotion to the Blessed Virgin Mary and to the Eucharist, particularly the Forty Hours Devotion.

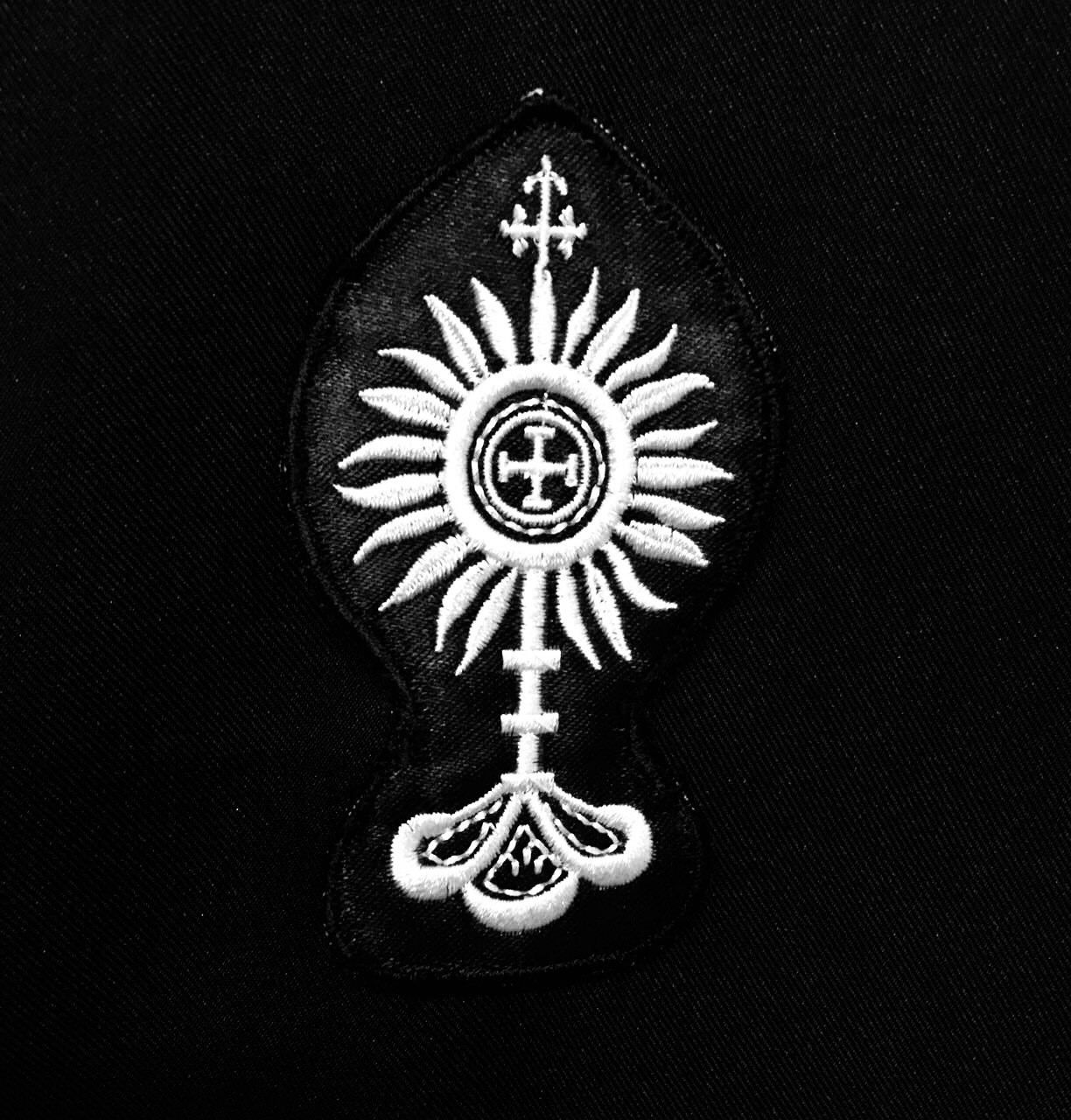
Insignia of the Sacramentinos

Eymard became familiar with the practice of sustained eucharistic worship during a visit to Paris in 1849, when he met with members of the Association of Nocturnal Adorers who had established exposition and perpetual adoration of the Blessed Sacrament at the Basilica of Our Lady of Victories. Eymard, with permission from the Paris bishops, on 13 May 1856, left the Marist order and founded the Congregation of the Blessed Sacrament for men. The first community was established at 114 rue d'Enfer, Paris. In 1858 he, along with Marguerite Guillot, founded the Servants of the Blessed Sacrament, a contemplative congregation for women.

Eymard died on 1 August 1868. He was declared venerable in 1908, beatified in 1925, and canonized by Pope John XXIII on 9 December 1962. On 9 December 1995, Eymard was inserted into the General Roman Calendar with the rank of optional memorial.

Eymard's mission in the church consisted in promoting the centrality of the Eucharistic Mystery in the whole life of the Christian community, as the font and fullness of all evangelization and striking expression of the infinite love of the divine Redeemer for humankind. Since the Holy Eucharist clearly marked the life and pastoral activity of Peter Julian Eymard, he is known as an outstanding apostle of the Eucharist.

The Congregation of the Blessed Sacrament began working with children in Paris to prepare them to receive their First Communion. It also reached out to non-practicing Catholics, inviting them to repent and begin receiving Communion again. In 1859 he opened a second community at Marseilles and placed in charge of it his first companion, Fr. Raymond De Cuers. A third foundation was established at Antwerp and two others at Brussels, along with a formation house or novitiate at Saint-Maurice in the Diocese of Versailles.

== Eucharistic charism ==
Members of the congregation believe that Christ in the Eucharist has the power to effect a radical transformation in the society and in all people, motivating and strengthening everyone to work for the establishment of Christ's Kingdom on earth. Each religious proclaims the reality of God's love in the Eucharist by his "gift of self" to Him and his brothers and sisters. By prayer in the presence of the Blessed Sacrament and an active apostolic life, he strives to make Christ in the Eucharist better known and loved.

Eymard was a tireless proponent of frequent Holy Communion, an idea given more authoritative backing by Pope Pius X in 1905.

== Mission ==
Following in the footsteps of Eymard, the mission of the Congregation of the Blessed Sacrament is "to respond to the hungers of the human family with the riches of God's love manifested in the Eucharist."

Conscious of a call to bear prophetic witness to the Eucharist, members of the congregation commit themselves to the renewal of church and society through this sacrament, especially by gathering communities characterized by hospitality, reconciliation, and service; and celebrating the Eucharist as the source and summit of the life of the church.

By their lives and activities, they share in the mission of the church, so that the Eucharist may be celebrated in truth, that the faithful may grow in their communion with the Lord through Eucharistic adoration in the setting of solemn exposition, that they may commit themselves to the renewal of their Christian communities, and collaborate in liberating individuals and society from the forces of evil.

United in Spirit with those who are poor and weak, they oppose everything which degrades human dignity and they proclaim a more just and brotherly world as they await the coming of the Lord.

== The Congregation today ==
Since its founding, the members of the congregation have reached all continents of the globe and continue the mission begun by Peter Julian Eymard. Currently numbering a little less than a thousand religious, they are present in thirty countries.

== Notable members ==
- Archbishop Aldo di Cillo Pagotto
- Bishop Jorge Alves Bezerra
- Bishop Sofronio Aguirre Bancud
- Bishop Martin Boucar Tine
- Bishop Julian Winston Sebastian Fernando
- Bishop Édouard Kisonga Ndinga
- Bishop Paulo Mandlate
- Bishop Johannes Gerardus Maria van Burgsteden
