= Benedictine Nuns of Perpetual Adoration of the Blessed Sacrament =

Catholic female congregation

- Abbreviation: O.S.B.
- Formation: March 1653, 25; 373 years ago
- Founder: Mechtilde of the Blessed Sacrament
- Type: Catholic religious order

Benedictine Nuns of Perpetual Adoration of the Blessed Sacrament is a female enclosed Catholic order founded in Paris, France in 1653 by Mechtilde of the Blessed Sacrament.

Each convent of the order is autonomous. Congregational convents are located in France, the Netherlands, Luxembourg, Mexico, Poland, Germany, Uganda, Italy and Haiti. According to a 2011 statistic, overall 553 nuns were members of the order at the time.

== History ==
The founder of the order, Mechtilde of the Blessed Sacrament, was the superior of the Annonciades under the name of Sister Catherine of the Saint-John the Evangelist. Due to wars, the nuns had to leave their convent. The exile roam lasted about two and a half years, and caused illness, leaving Catherine with only five nuns. Finally, in May 1638, the sisters found shelter in the Benedictine order at Rambervillers. After some time the superior of the Benedictine family of Rambervillers proposed that the sisters join their assembly, which they did. Then, Catherine took the name Mechtilde. Already then, for a long time she has had a special honor for the Eucharist.

In 1653, with the help of Queen Anne of Austria, the first convent of the new congregation was established in Paris, France. After the constitution was approved, the sisters began to make an additional vow to sustain the cult and ceaseless adoration of the Blessed Sacrament.

=== Poland ===
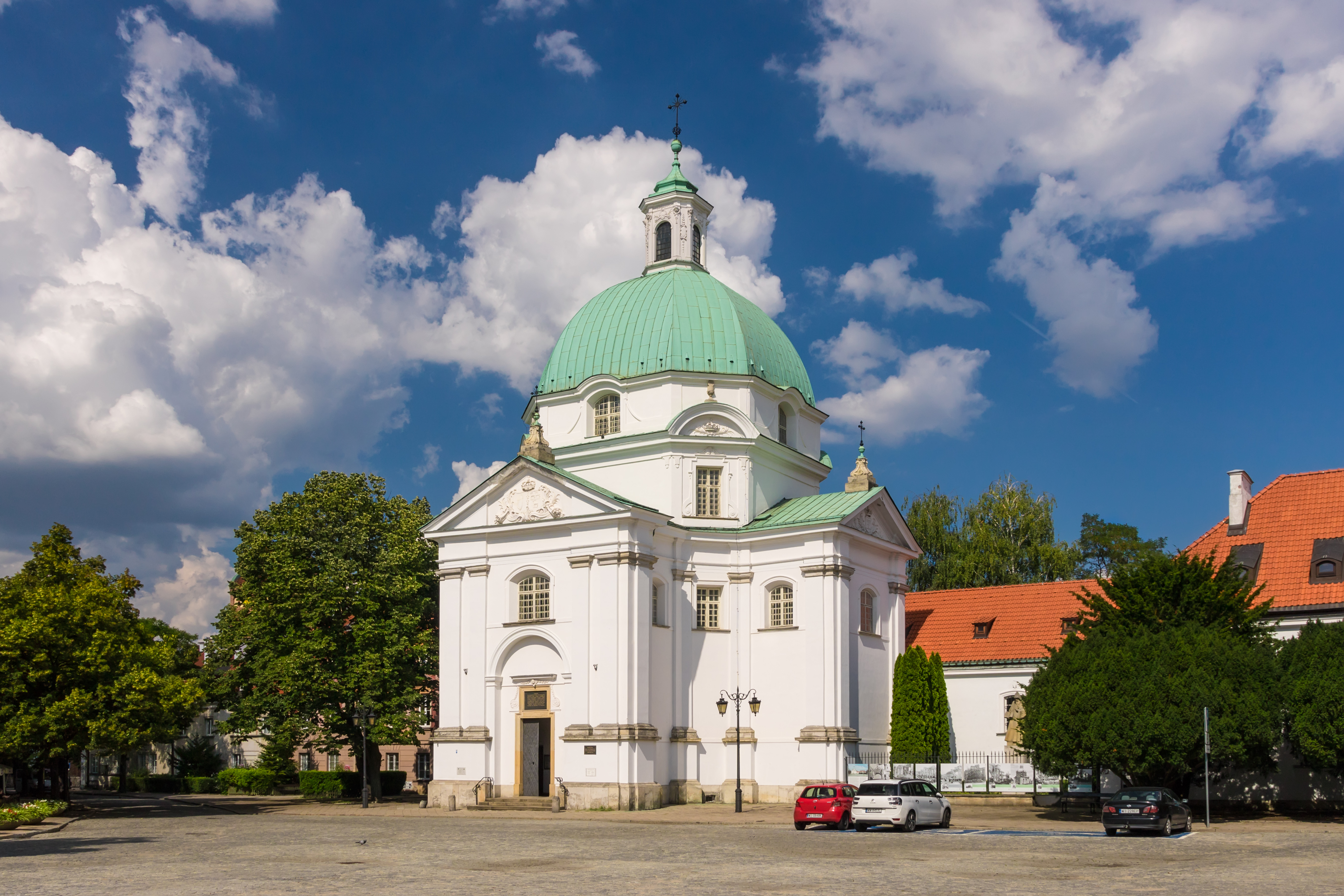
St. Kazimierz Church in Warsaw's New Town, Poland, part of the Benedictine Nuns of Perpetual Adoration of the Blessed Sacrament monastery in Warsaw

In Poland, the first convent of Benedictine of the Most Blessed Sacrament was founded in Warsaw in 1688 by Queen Marie Casimire in recognition of the victory of Polish King's Jan III Sobieski victory over the Turks near Vienna (1683).

The nuns departed from France on August 22, 1687, and arrived to Warsaw after two months of travel. Since the monastery was not yet built for them, they temporarily lived in the Royal Castle, where they started their adoration on January 1, 1688. They moved to a new monastery on June 27, 1688.

The Warsaw convent is the only foundation from the time of the founder that exists continuously in the same place, and one of ten established during the lifetime of Mother Mechtilde. During the Warsaw Uprising in 1944 the church and convent were completely destroyed, burying in its ruins 35 nuns and a high number of inhabitants of the Old Town. During the 2022 Russian invasion of Ukraine, women's Benedictine monasteries around the world have offered financial support to assist refugees and aid those suffering in Ukraine. The funds are sent to the Abbess of the Monastery in Warsaw, who is in contact with sisters in Ukraine.

The second convent in Poland was established in Lviv in 1715. In 1946, it was repatriated to Silesia, and is now located in the City of Wrocław. The third convent in Poland, founded in 1959, is located in Siedlce, in the Podlasie area.

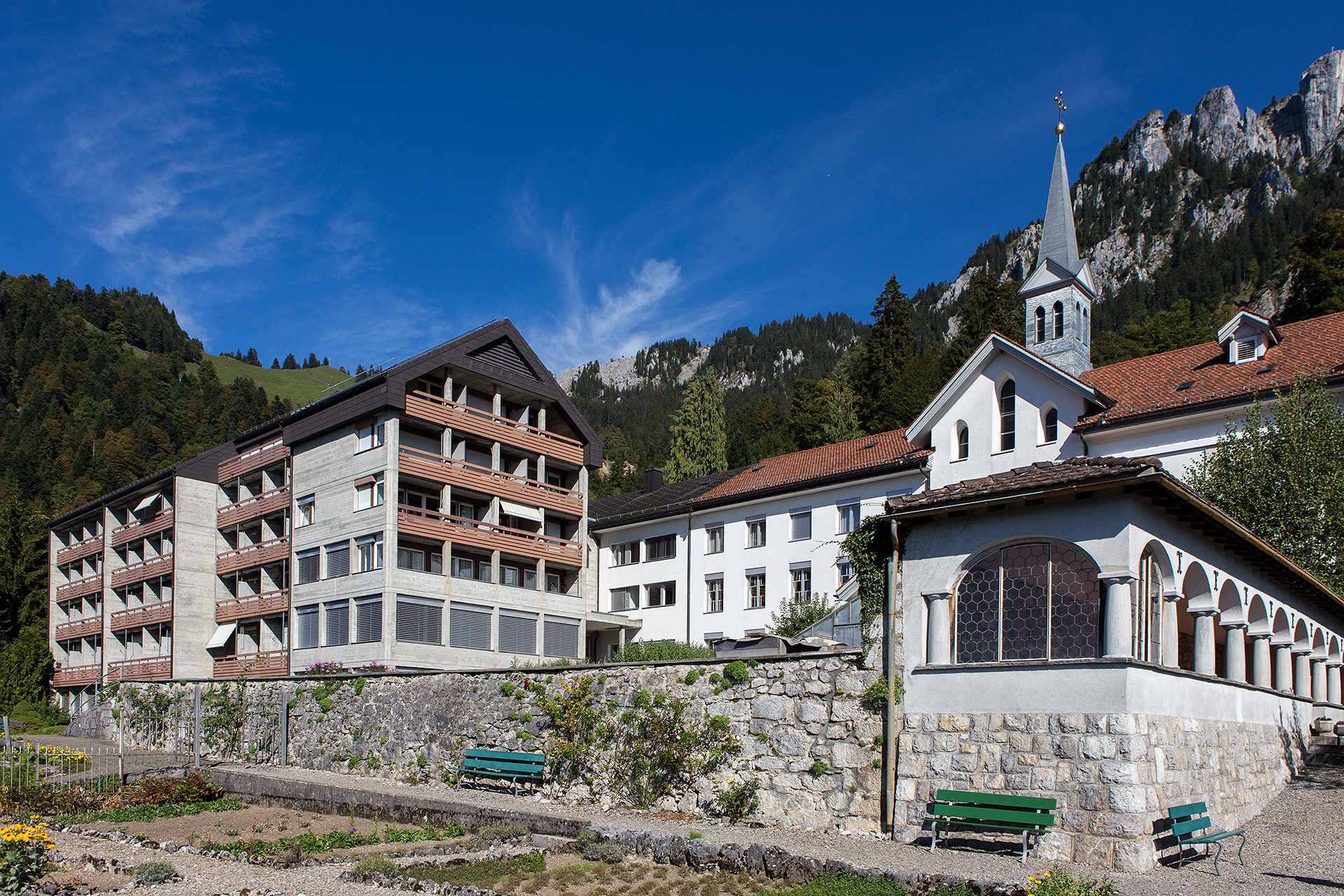
Kloster-Maria-Rickenbach

=== Germany ===
In 1857, Maria Rickenbach Monastery was founded at Niederrickenbach at the site of a Wayside shrine with assistance from the monks of Engelberg Abbey.

=== U.S. ===
In 1874, sisters from Maria Rickenbach came to Missouri to assist monks from Engelberg Abbey in ministering to German immigrants. The sisters established themselves in Clyde, Missouri.

== Activity ==
The nuns live according to the rules of Benedict of Nursia. The order has a contemplative character, and the center of life is the adoration of the Eucharist. Depending on the monastery, the sisters bake the host, produce rosaries, icons, candles and food products.

The sisters live in a strictly enclosed way, nevertheless, they may take in their circle a few people who want religious life with adoration of the Blessed Sacrament without the obligation to keep a strict enclosure.

The religious costume in Poland, Italy and some of the monasteries in France consists of a black habit belted with a leather belt, a black scapular, a white bonnet surrounding the face and a black veil. On the chest there is (except for monasteries in Germany) the symbol of the Blessed Sacrament, which may look different depending on the monastery. In other countries, the religious costume may look different.

== Bibliography ==
- Annuario pontificio per l'anno 2007, Libreria editrice vaticana, Città del Vaticano, 2007. ISBN 978-88-209-7908-9.
- Guerrino Pelliccia e Giancarlo Rocca, Dizionario degli istituti di perfezione (Volume 10), Edizioni paoline, Milano, 1974–2003.
- Marcel Albert: Frauen mit Geschichte. Die deutschsprachigen Klöster der Benediktinerinnen vom Heiligsten Sakrament. EOS Verlag, St. Ottilien 2003, ISBN 3-8306-7171-7 (Studien und Mitteilungen zur Geschichte des Benediktinerordens und seiner Zweige. Ergänzungsband 42)
- Ad adorationem perpetuam. Die Ewige Anbetung in den Ordensgemeinschaften des deutschen Sprachraums. Benediktinerinnen, Köln 2006 (Recherchen 23, ZDB-ID 2284997-X).
- The Mystery of Incomprehensible Love: The Eucharistic Message of Mother Mectilde of the Blessed Sacrament. Brooklyn, NY: Angelico Press, 2020. [Contains the fullest biography of Mother Mectilde published in English so far: "Mectilde of the Blessed Sacrament and Her Times" by Canon G.A. Simon, pp. 113–51. The Afterword is a translation of Dom Jean Leclercq, OSB's "A School of Benedictine Spirituality from the 17th Century: The Benedictines of Perpetual Adoration."
