= Peter Julian Eymard =

French priest and saint (1811–1868)

Saint Peter Julian Eymard S.S.S.
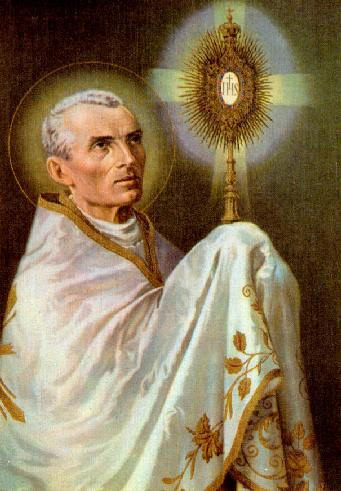

Priest Apostle of the Eucharist Confessor
- Born: 4 February 1811; La Mure, Grenoble, French Empire
- Died: 1 August 1868 (aged 57); La Mure, Grenoble, French Empire
- Resting place: the Chapelle du Corpus-Christi (Corpus Christi Chapel)
- Venerated in: Catholic Church
- Beatified: 12 July 1925 by Pope Pius XI
- Canonized: 9 December 1962 by Pope John XXIII
- Major shrine: Santi Claudio e Andrea dei Borgognoni
- Feast: 2 August
- Attributes: Eucharist, Monstrance, Eucharistic Adoration, Eucharistic Congress, Cope, Humeral Veil, Congregation of the Blessed Sacrament, Servants of the Blessed Sacrament, Real Presence

Peter Julian Eymard (French: Pierre-Julien Eymard [pjɛʁ ʒyljɛ̃ ɛjmɑʁ]; 4 February 1811 – 1 August 1868) was a French Catholic priest, saint and founder of two religious institutes: the Congregation of the Blessed Sacrament for men and the Servants of the Blessed Sacrament for women. Eymard is revered for his contributions to the Catholic doctrine of eucharistic adoration.

== Life ==
Eymard was born 4 February 1811 at La Mure, Isère, in the French Alps. His father was a blacksmith whose second wife was Julian's mother. All his life Peter Julian (or Pierre-Julien in French) had a devotion to Mary, the Mother of God. Before his First Communion on 16 March 1823, he went on foot to the shrine of Notre-Dame du Laus. Later, he learned of the apparition of Notre-Dame de La Salette and enjoyed traveling to various Marian shrines throughout France.

When his mother died in 1828 Julian resolved to enter the novitiate of the Oblates of Mary Immaculate and, despite his father's opposition, he did so in June 1829. His first attempt as a seminarian ended because of a serious illness. Throughout his life, Eymard suffered from poor health, particularly 'weakness of the lungs' and migraine headaches.

After his father's death in 1831, he succeeded – with the help of his former superior – in gaining admission to the major seminary of the Diocese of Grenoble. On 20 July 1834, he was ordained as a priest for the Diocese of Grenoble. He was assigned as assistant pastor at the town of Chatte, and three years later appointed pastor of Mount Saint-Eynard.

On his second assignment at Monteynard, the parish, which had a dilapidated church and poor rectory, consisted of a farming community with few people attending Mass. There had not been a regular pastor there for some time. The bishop urged Eymard's two sisters to move with him to the rectory, which they did. In fact, they furnished the rectory, for the parish was very poor. Although Eymard is known to have revitalized the place, he was dissatisfied with parish work, and decided to join the Marists (the Society of Mary). His two sisters were quite devastated as they had dedicated their lives to serving him.

On August 20, 1837, he entered the Society of Mary seminary at Lyon and made his profession in February 1840. He worked with lay organizations promoting devotion to the Blessed Virgin Mary and to the Eucharist, particularly in the Forty Hours. He rose to the position of Provincial of the Society at Lyon in 1844. His new responsibilities included being in charge of the Third Order of Mary, a lay group dedicated to Marist spirituality and to the promotion of the Christian family. John Vianney was a member.

His eucharistic spirituality did not spring full-grown from some mystical experience, but progressively. As visitor-general, Eymard travelled throughout France to inspect the various Marist communities. He became familiar with the practice of sustained eucharistic worship during a visit to Paris in 1849, when he met with members of the Association of Nocturnal Adorers who had established exposition and perpetual adoration of the Blessed Sacrament at the Basilica of Our Lady of Victories. After praying at the shrine of Our Lady of Fourviere on 21 January 1851, Eymard moved to establish a Marist community dedicated to eucharistic adoration. However, his desire to establish a separate fraternity promoting adoration of the Blessed Sacrament was not seen as part of the charism of the Marists. His superiors disapproved, transferring him to the Marist College at La Seyne-sur-Mer. Eventually, Eymard resolved to leave the Society of Mary to begin his new religious congregation with the diocesan priest Raymond de Cuers.

== Congregation of the Blessed Sacrament ==
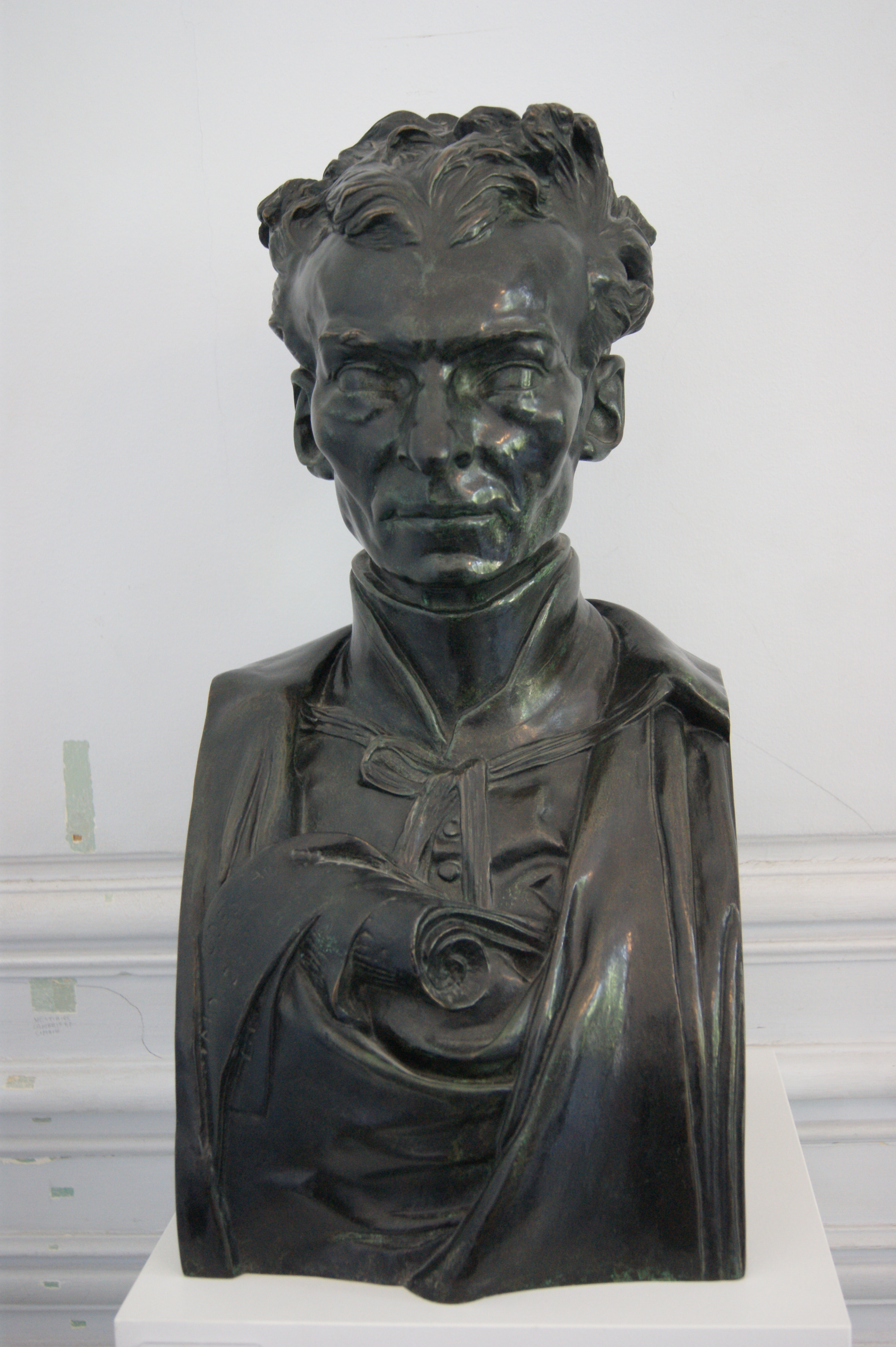
Le Père Eymard, by Rodin

On 13 May 1856, the Paris bishops consented to Eymard's plans for a 'Society of the Blessed Sacrament'. After many trials, Eymard and de Cuers established public exposition of the Blessed Sacrament in Paris on 6 January 1857 in a run-down building at 114 rue d'Enfer (which literally meant 'street of hell').

The Congregation of the Blessed Sacrament began working with children in Paris to prepare them to receive their First Communion. It also reached out to non-practising Catholics, inviting them to repent and begin receiving Communion again. Eymard established a common rule for the members of the society and worked toward papal approval. A second community was established in Marseille in 1859, and a third in Angers in 1862. Pius IX granted a Decree of Approbation in June 1863. Eymard was a proponent of frequent Holy Communion, an idea given more authoritative backing by Pope Pius X in 1905.

On 10 January 1969 Pope Paul VI issued a letter to Roland Huot, the Superior General of the Congregation of the Blessed Sacrament, affirming the relevance of eucharist adoration to modern Catholics. This concession is included in the revised Roman Ritual, Holy Communion and the Worship of the Eucharist Outside Mass, No. 90 in the editio typica.

The French sculptor Auguste Rodin received counsel from Eymard when Rodin entered the Congregation as a lay brother in 1862, having given up art after the death of his sister. Eymard recognized Rodin's talent and advised him to return to sculpting. While with the Order, Rodin produced a bust of Eymard, which Eymard refused to accept. The coiffed hair and bald corners of the head suggested to the priest the 'horns of the devil' and asked the bust to be altered. Rodin refused and Eymard had his copy hidden away. The Congregation now holds a more positive view of the work, displaying casts in order houses throughout the world.

== Servants of the Blessed Sacrament ==
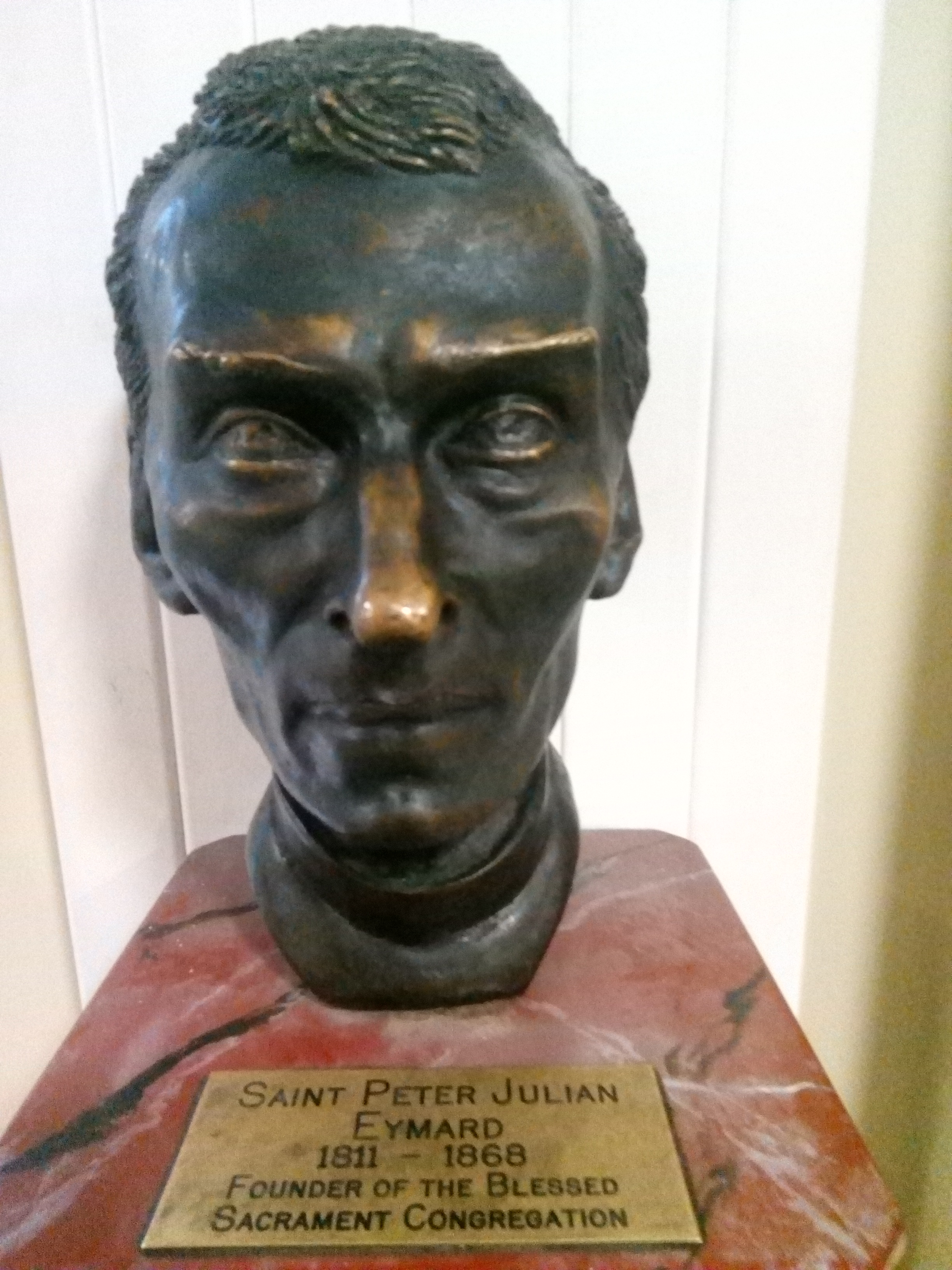
Bust of Eymard in a church in Dublin

In 1858, together with Marguerite Guillot, he founded the Servants of the Blessed Sacrament, a contemplative congregation for women. He is quoted as saying, "You take Communion to become holy, not because you already are."

== Contemporaries ==
Eymard was a friend and contemporary of John Marie Vianney, Peter Chanel, Marcellin Champagnat, Basil Moreau and Pauline-Marie Jaricot. He died of complications from a brain haemorrhage at the age of fifty-seven in La Mure on 1 August 1868. His remains were buried in the cemetery at La Mure until 1877, when they were moved to the Blessed Sacrament Congregation's Corpus Christi Chapel in Paris, which had been consecrated in September 1876.

== Veneration ==
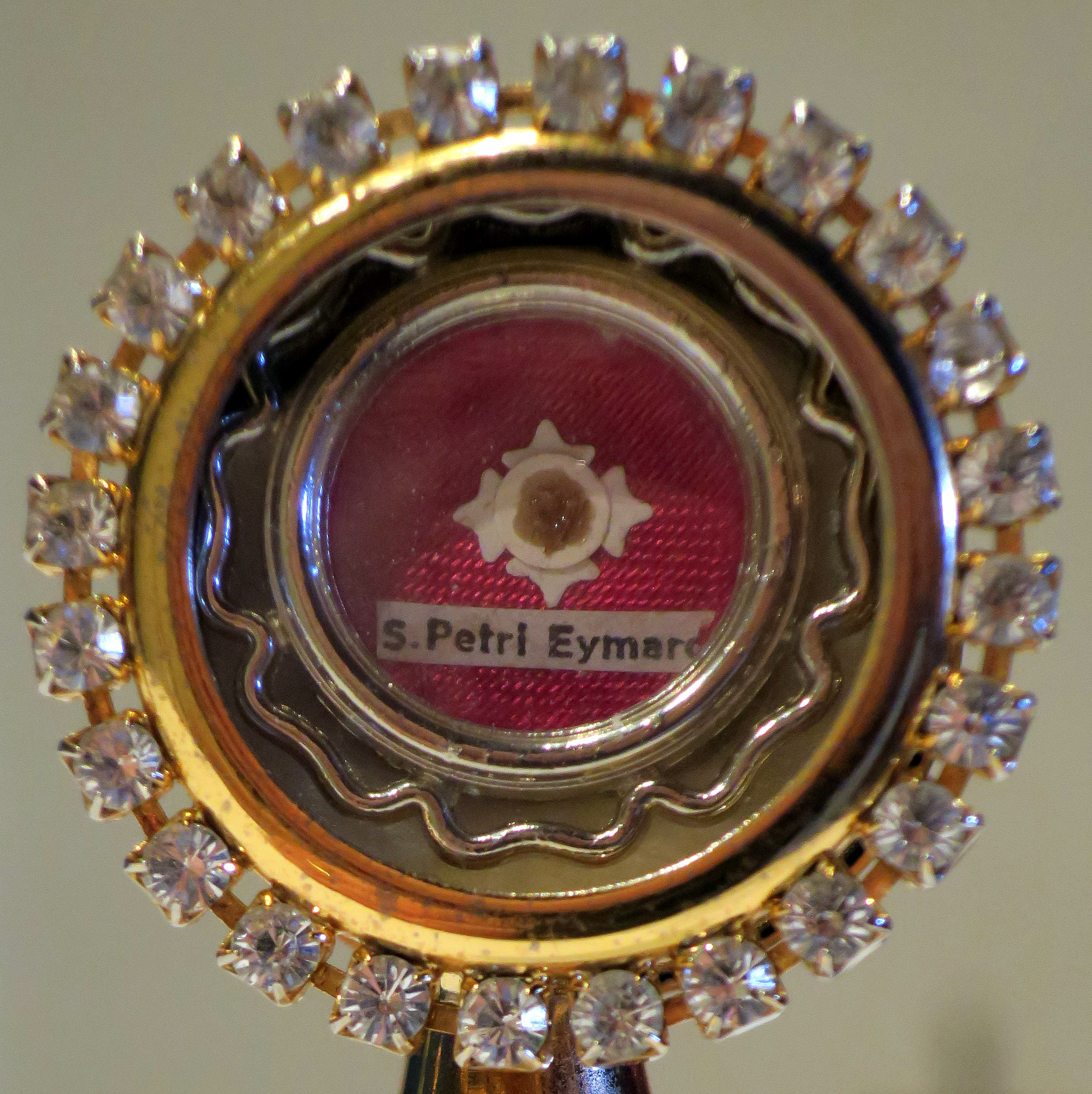
A relic of Eymard displayed for veneration at a church in Alabama.

Eymard was declared venerable in 1908, and beatified by Pope Pius XI on 12 July 1926. The cause for his canonization was opened on 28 July 1926, and he was canonized by Pope John XXIII on 9 December 1962. Also canonized with Eymard were Servite priest Anthony Mary Pucci (1819–1892) and the Capuchin lay brother Francis Mary of Camporosso (1804–1866). His feast day is celebrated in the Roman Catholic Church on 2 August. Pope John Paul II named Eymard "Apostle of the Eucharist".

There is a statue of Eymard in Saint Jean Baptiste Catholic Church in New York City. Below the statue is a reliquary containing his right humerus bone.

== Legacy ==
Eymard is recognised as a major contributor to nineteenth-century French spirituality.

Catholic churches dedicated to Eymard are located in:

- Mooroolbark, Victoria, Australia
- Sydney, New South Wales, Australia
- La Mure, Isère, France
- Koudiadiène, Thiès, Senegal
- New Orleans, Louisiana, United States
- Holiday, Florida, United States
- Thome, Nairobi, Kenya

The following landmarks have been named to honor Eymard:

- Rue Julien-Eymard (Julien Eymard Street), located in Shawinigan, Quebec, Canada;
- Eymard Drive (formerly Sunnyside Drive), located along E. Rodriguez St., Quezon City, Philippines, where the provincial house of the Congregation of the Blessed Sacrament, Province of our Lady of the Assumption is located;
- Peter Julian Eymard Street, located in Sto. Nino Homes Phase 3-C, Brgy. Perez, Meycauayan City, Bulacan, Philippines.

== See also ==
- Saint Peter Julian Eymard, patron saint archive

== Notes ==
1. Sometimes spelled Eymund.

== Sources ==
- Cash S.S.S., Damien. The Road to Emmaus: A History of the Blessed Sacrament Congregation in Australia, David Lovell Publishing, 2007
- Letellier, Arthur. "Venerable Pierre-Julien Eymard." The Catholic Encyclopedia. Vol. 5. New York: Robert Appleton Company, 1909. 29 Jun. 2013
