= Maria Candida of the Eucharist =

Italian Discalced Carmelite and Blessed

Blessed Maria Candida of the Eucharist OCD
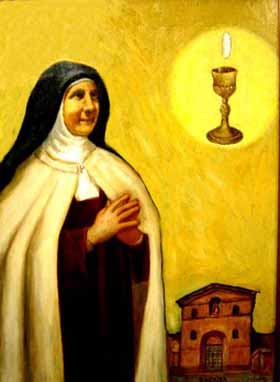

Virgin
- Born: Maria Barba; 16 January 1884; Catanzaro, Kingdom of Italy
- Died: 12 June 1949 (aged 65); Ragusa, Italy
- Venerated in: Roman Catholic Church
- Beatified: 21 March 2004, Saint Peter's Square, Vatican City by Pope John Paul II
- Feast: 21 March; 14 June (Discalced Carmelites)
- Attributes: Chalice and eucharist, convent, Discalced Carmelite's habit

Maria Candida of the Eucharist, OCD (born Maria Barba; 16 January 1884 – 12 June 1949) was an Italian Discalced Carmelite. Barba desired to become a nun in her adolescence but her parents forbade this and she was forced to wait two decades to realize her dream; she entered the order after her parents died, though she alienated her brothers in the process. They refused to ever see her due to their resentment of her decision. Barba became a noted member of her convent in Ragusa and she served as prioress. Her devotion to the Eucharist was a focal point for her spiritual thinking and her own life. Pope John Paul II beatified Barba in Saint Peter's Square on 21 March 2004.

== Life ==
Maria Barba was born on 16 January 1884 in Catanzaro as the tenth of twelve children (five of whom died in their childhoods) to the appellate court judge Pietro Barba and Giovanna Flora; she was baptised on the following 19 January. Her parents and siblings all hailed from Palermo but moved to Catanzaro while her father was in that town during a brief assignment. In 1886 the family returned to Palermo.

In 1891 she began her time at school and achieved excellent grades while there; she completed her studies in 1898. That same year she began to learn the piano. On 3 April 1894 she received her First Communion and from that point on fostered a special devotion to the Eucharist and developed what she referred to as her "vocation for the Eucharist". Barba despaired at not being able to receive it on a frequent basis. In 1899 she felt a strong calling to the consecrated life as she reflected before an image of the Sacred Heart. She would call this experience her "transformation", and the investiture of her cousin as a nun in 1899 augmented this desire. Barba informed her parents of her decision but her parents opposed this, believing it nothing more than initial spiritual fervour rather than an actual desire. But Barba's devotion grew after learning about the charism of the Discalced Carmelites which inspired her more through reading The Story of a Soul of Thérèse of Lisieux. This also encouraged her to persevere despite being rejected and she continued to wait for the time when she could achieve her dream.

Barba's father died on 21 June 1904. In September 1910 she and her family undertook a pilgrimage to Rome and met Pope Pius X in an audience. The girl later received the sacrament of Confirmation at a rather advanced age on 12 November 1912. Her mother died on 5 June 1914. Barba could not receive the Eucharist on a frequent basis as her brothers would not allow her to go out on her own, so she complied so as not to offend them.

Barba waited for two decades before she could enter the Carmel at Ragusa on 25 September 1919. The Archbishop of Palermo, Alessandro Lualdi, encouraged her to enter and fulfil her desire to become a nun. On 16 April 1920, her investiture as a Carmelite, she assumed the religious name Maria Candida of the Eucharist. Barba made her first vows on 17 April 1921 and her perpetual vows on 23 April 1924.

In 1924 she was elected as the prioress of the convent on 10 November;. She was re-elected into this office five times until 1947. Barba worked hard with caution to revive the spirit of their foundress and under her leadership the convent grew to a point where a new foundation could be made in Syracuse. The prioress also helped to secure the return of the Carmelite friars to the Sicilian region.

On 19 June 1933, the Feast of Corpus Christi, the Barba began writing a record of her personal experiences and reflections on Eucharistic meditations, which was completed in 1936. The records also contained theological reflections on those personal experiences. On 16 June 1922 she had starting writing Up: First Steps on her vocation and arrival to the convent while later on 5 November 1926 beginning Mountain Song at the request of her confessor on her Carmelite life.

Barba was first diagnosed with a tumor in her liver back in 1947. She died of cancer on the evening of 12 June 1949 and her remains were interred at Ragusa the following 14 June. Her remains were later relocated on 12 November 1970.

== Beatification ==
The beatification process opened in Ragusa in an informative process that Bishop Francesco Pennisi oversaw from its inauguration on 5 March 1956 until its closure later on 28 June 1962; the formal introduction to the cause came on 15 October 1981 in which she became titled as a Servant of God. The Congregation for the Causes of Saints validated the previous informative process in Rome on 31 May 1991 and received the positio in 1992. Theologians assented to the cause on 28 April 2000 as did the Congregation on 17 October 2000; the confirmation of her life of heroic virtue allowed for Pope John Paul II to declare her as venerable on 18 December 2000.

The process for a miracle needed for beatification was investigated in the place of its origin from 12 June 1986 until 9 December 1986 while the Congregation validated the process on 26 March 1993 in Rome. John Paul II approved this miracle on 12 April 2003 and beatified Barba on 21 March 2004 in Saint Peter's Square. A second miracle was investigated in the place of its origin from 29 June 2007 until 19 June 2008. The postulator for the cause is the Romano Gambalunga OCD.

== Quotations ==
In her book she related devotions to the Virgin Mary to the Eucharist and wrote: "I want to be like Mary ... to be Mary for Jesus, to take the place of His Mother. When I receive Jesus in Communion, Mary is always present. I want to receive Jesus from her hands, she must make me one with Him. I cannot separate Mary from Jesus. Hail, O Body born of Mary. Hail Mary, dawn of the Eucharist!"

Among her other statements:

- "O my Beloved Sacrament, I see You, I believe in You! O Holy Faith. Contemplate with ever-greater faith our Dear Lord in the Sacrament: live with Him who comes to us every day."
- "O My Divine Eucharist, my dear Hope, all our hope is in You. Ever since I was a baby my hope in the Holy Eucharist has been strong."
- "My Jesus, how I love You! There is within my heart an enormous love for You, O Sacramental Love. How great is the love of God made bread for our souls, who becomes a prisoner for me!"

== Publications ==
- Up: First Steps, 1922
- Mountain Song, 1926
- The Eucharist: True Jewel of Eucharistic Spirituality, 1936

== See also ==
- Alexandrina of Balazar
- Concepción Cabrera de Armida
