= Concepción Cabrera de Armida =

Mexican Catholic mystic

Blessed Concepción Cabrera de Armida
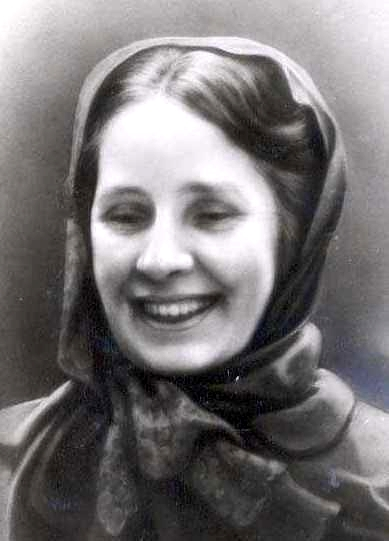
- c. 1882
- Born: María Concepción Cabrera Arias; 8 December 1862; San Luis Potosí, Mexico
- Died: 3 March 1937 (aged 74); Mexico City, Mexico
- Venerated in: Catholic Church
- Beatified: 4 May 2019, Basilica of Our Lady of Guadalupe, Mexico City, Mexico by Cardinal Giovanni Angelo Becciu
- Feast: 3 March

Concepción Cabrera de Armida (8 December 1862 – 3 March 1937) was a Mexican Catholic mystic and writer.

She was beatified in Mexico City on 4 May 2019, as the first Mexican laywoman to receive this recognition.

== Life ==
In 1884, she married Francisco Armida, with whom she had nine children between 1885 and 1899. In 1901, when she was 39 years old, her husband died and she had to care for her children.

As a mystic, she reported that she heard God telling her: "Ask me for a long suffering life and to write a lot... That's your mission on earth".

Her spiritual life started before the death of her husband. In 1894, she took "spiritual nuptials" and in 1896 wrote in her diary: "In truth, after I touched God and had an imperfect notion of His Being, I wanted to prostrate myself, my forehead and my heart, in the dust and never get up again."

During her life her writings were examined by the Catholic Church in Mexico and even during her pilgrimage to Rome in 1913 during which she had an audience with Pope Pius X. Church authorities looked favorably upon her writings.

== Death ==
Cabrera died on 3 March 1937 at the age of 74 and is buried at the Church of San José del Altillo in Mexico City.

== Beatification ==
Pope John Paul II declared her as Venerable on December 20, 1999, and began the process of beatification.

Pope Francis accepted a miracle attributed to her intercession on 8 June 2018, thus paving the way for her to be formally beatified, and Cabrera was beatified on 4 May 2019 in a ceremony which was held in Mexico City, at the Basilica of Our Lady of Guadalupe.
