= Servants of the Blessed Sacrament =

Congregation of Catholic sisters

- Servas do Sanctissimo Sacramento
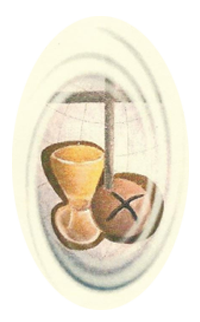
- Abbreviation: SSS., Servants
- Formation: 13 May 1856; 170 years ago
- Founder: Peter Julian Eymard, Mo. Marguerite Guillot
- Type: Catholic religious order
- Headquarters: 580 rue Dufferin Sherbrooke Qc Canada J1H 4N1
- Superior General: Sr. Fe Manalo, S.S.S.
- Website: www.blesacrament.org

The Servants of the Blessed Sacrament (in Latin: Societatis Ancillarum a Sanctissimo Sacramento) is a Roman Catholic contemplative, but not cloistered, congregation of sisters with a focus on Eucharistic adoration.

== History ==
=== Marguerite Guillot ===
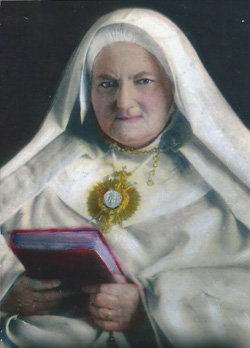
Mother Marguerite Guillot

The Servants' religious congregation is the women's branch of the Congregation of the Blessed Sacrament, founded by Peter Julian Eymard over one hundred forty years ago.

Marguerite Guillot was born December 4, 1815, in Chasselay, Rhône, the youngest child of Jean and Jeanne Boin Guillot. In February 1840, she recovered from a bout of typhoid fever and the family made a pilgrimage to Our Lady of Fourviere in Lyons in thanksgiving. In December 1845 she joined the Third Order of Mary, and in 1853 became the directress. Eymard was the group's spiritual director.

Guillot collaborated with Eymard and became the first superior general for the congregation, which was approved by Pope Pius IX in 1871. The Congregation of the Servants of the Blessed Sacrament marks July 31, 1859, as the date of foundation. Guillot founded houses in Angers and Lyon. She died July 7, 1885.

=== Congregation ===
From France, the Congregation spread throughout the world. In 1903 a house was opened in Canada, in Brazil in 1912, and in Australia in 1950.

=== United States Community ===
The first house in the United States was established in Waterville, Maine, in April 1947, by six sisters from the Canadian foundation. In June 1956 a second American foundation was established in Pueblo, Colorado. The sisters maintain continuous adoration of the Blessed Sacrament in their communities. In 2009, due to lack of vocations, the American sisters asked the help of the sisters in the Philippines so the Congregation could continue its Eucharistic presence and mission in Pueblo. Four sisters came.

In January 1996, a tragedy occurred at the Sisters' convent, located in Waterville, Maine. A mentally ill man broke into the convent in the middle of a winter storm, and attacked four of the nine Sisters who lived there. Two, including the Mother Superior were killed, while another was so severely injured that she had to be placed in a nursing home. The nuns who survived the attack have since died. The individual was committed to what was then Augusta Mental Health Institute, now Riverview Psychiatric Hospital, but in June 2013 was granted unsupervised time in the community, despite objections from prosecutors.

=== Australian Community ===
The Australian foundation was established in 1950, when six Canadian sisters and one Australian who had taken her noviciate in Quebec arrived in Melbourne. This community made its income by producing the altar breads for the parishes of Melbourne and parts of regional Victoria. These sisters practiced continuous adoration of the Blessed Sacrament in their chapel at Armadale, a suburb of Melbourne, and lived by a strict regimen of silence, prayer and work. They were allowed only half an hour of reading per day, and education was not emphasised. All of this changed soon after Vatican II, when Catholic religious were asked to review and update their Rule of Life and adapt it to the contemporary world. A group of sisters used hammers and saws to remove the grille that separated them from their visitors in the convent's parlour, dismantling the enclosure that had separated them from the broader community for decades. The nuns pursued education in theology and other disciplines, and practiced a renewed liturgy at their chapel. In 1980, three of the sisters moved to Sydney to establish a convent in Newtown, where they worked closely with Fr Ted Kennedy and the local Indigenous community of Redfern. There are now just two sisters remaining in the Australian community.

Maureen Flood, became the order's regional superior in Australia and the deputy superior general of the Blessed Sacrament Order before traveling to Rome in 1981. Upon returning from Rome, Flood joined the nuns in the Newtown community. Flood began writing articles on Feminist Theology at this time.

== Apostolate ==
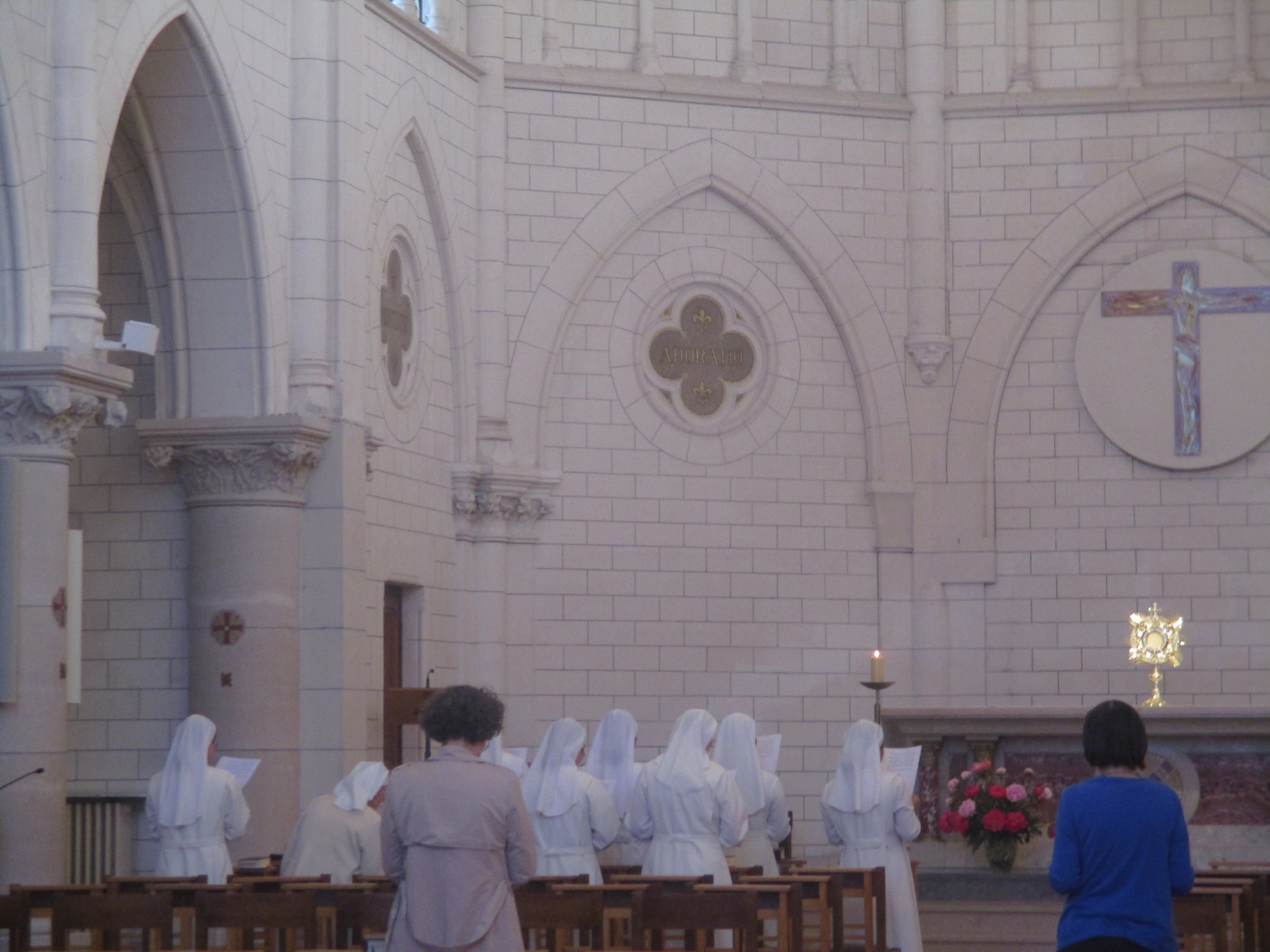
Sisters in their chapel of Paris.

Their houses are located in France, Canada, Brazil, Holland, the United States, Australia, Italy, the Philippines, Vietnam and Congo. The congregation's generalate is in Sherbrooke, Quebec.

The congregation is centered on the person of Christ in the Eucharistic Mystery and dedicated to his love and glory. The celebration of the Eucharist, the Liturgy of the Hours and Eucharistic adoration give form to their mission of prayer. Eucharistic Adoration has the priority of their time and attention. However, they also engage in other ministries, such as serving as extraordinary Eucharistic ministers to the sick and elderly. The patroness of the congregation is Mary, under the title of Our Lady of the Blessed Sacrament.
