= Palais des Congrès =

Palais des Congrès is the French term for a convention center. It may refer to one of the following buildings:

== Belgium ==
- Palais des Congrès de Bruxelles
- Palais des congrès de Liège

== France ==
- Centre des congrès de Saint-Étienne
- Centre international des congrès de Metz
- Cité Internationale des Congrès de Nantes
- Palais des congrès de Beaune
- Palais des congrès de Bordeaux
- Palais des congrès de La Rochelle
- Palais des congrès de Lyon
- Palais des congrès de Montpellier, see Corum (Montpellier)
- Palais des congrès de Nancy
- Palais des congrès de Nice
- Palais des congrès de Paris
- Palais des congrès de Toulon
- Palais des congrès du Technopole du Futuroscope
- Palais des congrès et de la Culture du Mans

== Canada ==
- Palais des congrès de Québec
- Palais des congrès de Montréal
- Palais des congrès de Gatineau

== Togo ==
- Palais des congrès, Lomé
