= Convention center =

Building designed to hold a convention

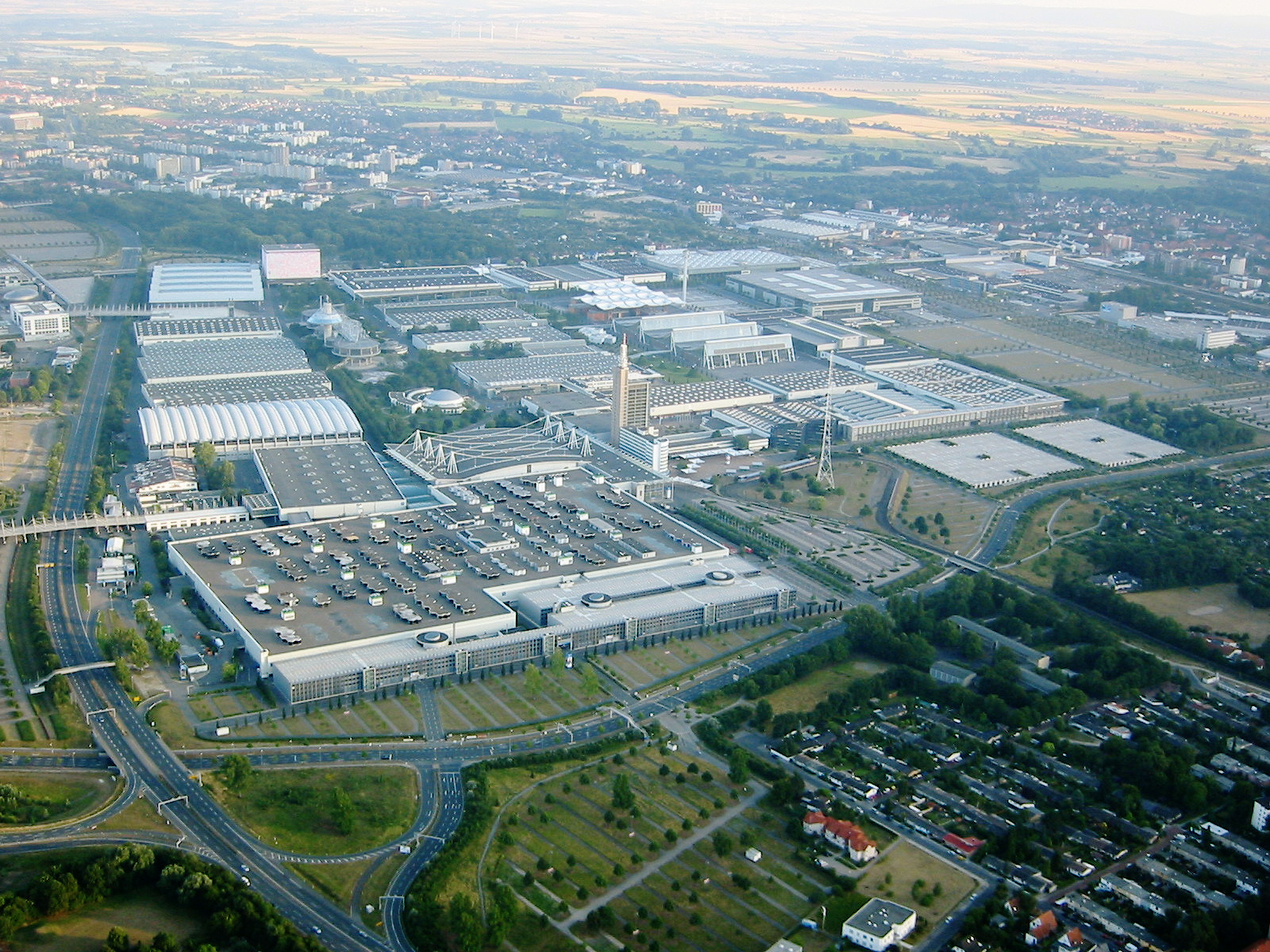
The Hanover Fairground in Hanover, Germany

A convention center (American English; or conference centre in British English) is a large building that is designed to hold a convention, where individuals and groups gather to promote and share common interests. Convention centers typically offer sufficient floor area to accommodate several thousand attendees. Very large venues, suitable for major trade shows, are sometimes known as exhibition halls. Convention centers typically have at least one auditorium and may also contain concert halls, lecture halls, meeting rooms, and conference rooms. Some large resort area hotels include a convention center.

In Francophone countries, the term is palais des congrès (such as the Palais des Congrès de Paris) or centre des congrès (such as the Centre des congrès de Quebec).

== Types ==
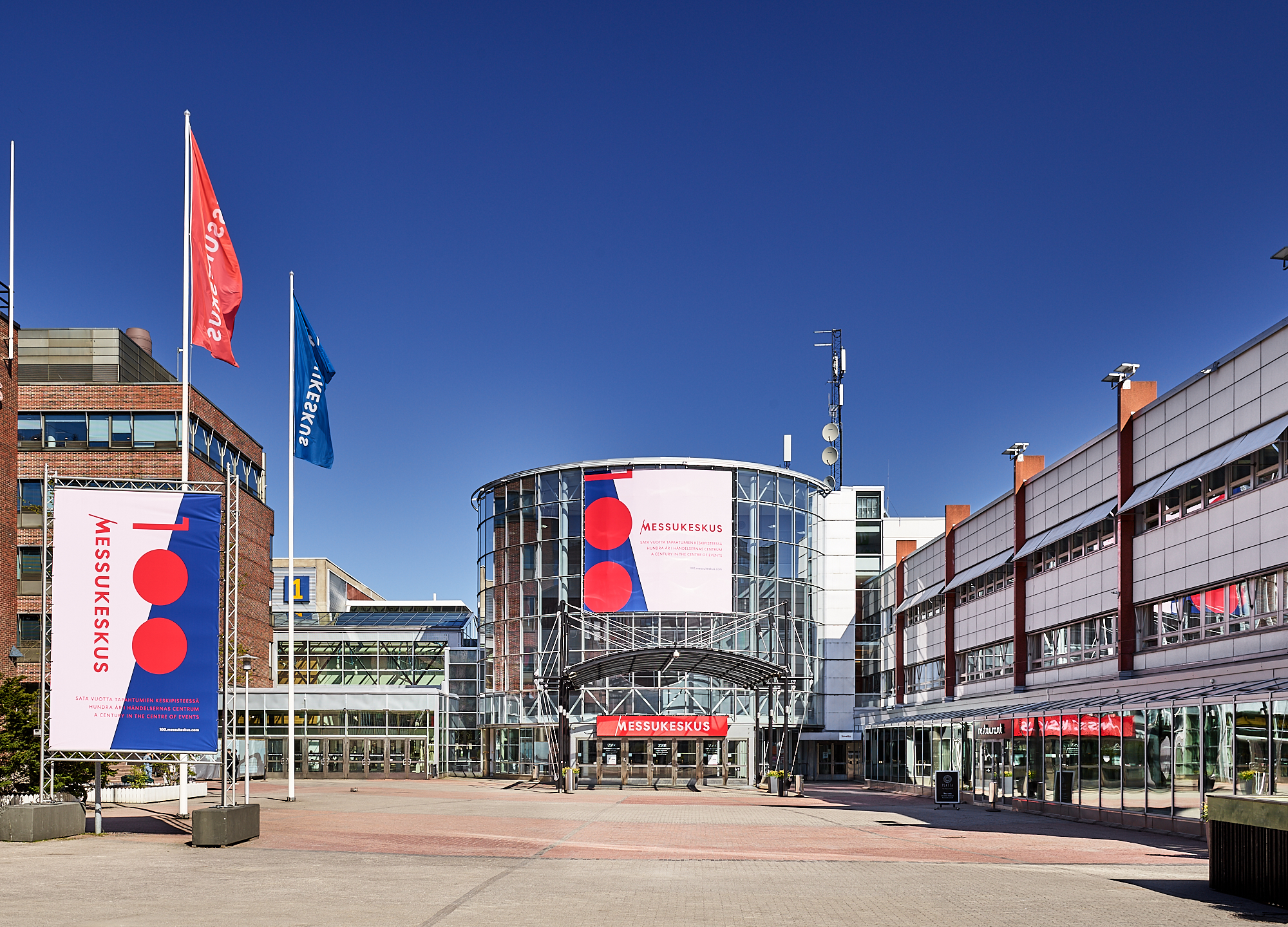
A southern entrance of the Helsinki Fair Centre in Pasila, Helsinki, Finland

- Meeting facilities with lodging: hotels that include their own convention space in addition to accommodation and other related facilities, known as convention hotels.
- Meeting facilities without lodging: are convention centers that do not include accommodation; usually located adjacent to or near a hotel(s).
- Other: any convention and meeting facilities designed to hold large numbers of people. Can exist alone (e.g., stadiums, arenas, parks, etc.) or within other structures (e.g., university lecture halls, museums, theaters). Usually do not include accommodation.

== History ==
The original convention centers or halls were in castles and palaces. Originally a hall in a castle would be designed to allow a large group of lords, knights and government officials to attend important meetings with the king. A more ancient tradition would have the king or lord decide disputes among his people. These administrative actions would be done in the great hall and would exhibit the wisdom of the king as judge to the general populace.

One of the most famous convention center debacles happened in France on June 20, 1789. King Louis XVI locked a group known as the Third Estate out of the meeting hall in Versailles. This led to the revolutionary group holding their meeting in an indoor tennis court. This was the first modern democratic conference center and led to the Tennis Court Oath and the French Revolution.

== Some historic centers ==
=== 19th-century exhibition halls ===
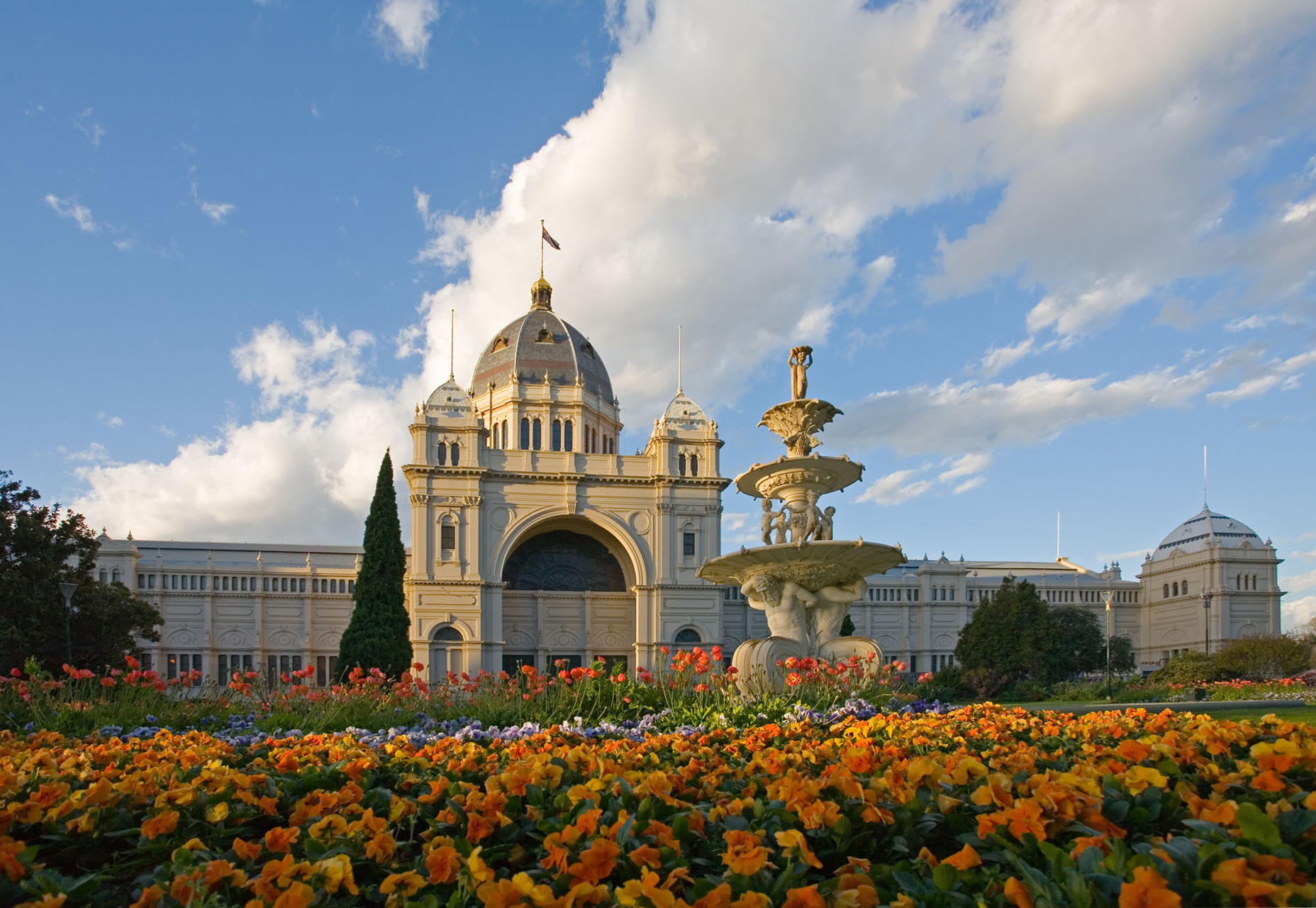
Melbourne's Royal Exhibition Building, host of the 1880 World's Fair

- 1850 Bingley Hall (destroyed by fire in 1984), Birmingham, England
- 1851 The Crystal Palace (destroyed by fire in 1936), London, England
- 1855 Palais de l'Industrie (dismantled in 1897), Paris, France
- 1873 Alexandra Palace, London, England
- 1876 Memorial Hall, Philadelphia, Pennsylvania, United States
- 1878 Exhibition Place, Toronto, Ontario, Canada
- 1878 La Rural, Buenos Aires, Argentina
- 1878 Music Hall, Cincinnati, Ohio, United States
- 1879 Garden Palace (destroyed by fire in 1882), Sydney, Australia
- 1880 Royal Exhibition Building, Melbourne, Australia
- 1898 Aberdeen Pavilion, Ottawa, Ontario, Canada
- 1898–1903 Beurs van Berlage, Amsterdam, Netherlands

=== 20th-century exhibition halls ===
- 1900 Grand Palais, Paris, France
- 1909 Festhalle, Frankfurt, Germany
- 1923 Paris Expo Porte de Versailles, Paris, France
- 1935 Brussels Expo, Brussels, Belgium
- 1958 Square – Brussels Convention Centre, Brussels, Belgium
- 1958 Centre of New Industries and Technologies, Paris, France
- 1959 Las Vegas Convention Center, Las Vegas, Nevada, United States
- 1960 McCormick Place, Chicago, Illinois, United States
- 1967 Anaheim Convention Center, Anaheim, California, United States
- 1971 Los Angeles Convention Center, Los Angeles, California, United States
- 1974 Kenyatta International Convention Centre, Nairobi, Kenya
- 1975 Helsinki Fair Centre, Helsinki, Finland
- 1976 Georgia World Congress Center, Atlanta, Georgia, United States
- 1976 Philippine International Convention Center, Pasay, Philippines
- 1977 Riocentro, Rio de Janeiro, Brazil
- 1979 Internationales Congress Centrum, Berlin, Germany
- 1981 BMO Centre, Calgary, Alberta, Canada
- 1981 Moscone Center, San Francisco, California, United States
- 1983 Palais des congrès de Montréal, Montreal, Quebec, Canada
- 1984 Metro Toronto Convention Centre, Toronto, Ontario, Canada
- 1983 Hong Kong Convention and Exhibition Centre, Wan Chai, Hong Kong
- 1986 Vancouver Convention Centre, Vancouver, British Columbia, Canada
- 1988 Seattle Convention Center, Seattle, Washington, United States
- 1989 Taipei International Convention Center, Taipei, Taiwan
- 1990 Colorado Convention Center, Denver, Colorado, United States
- 1990 Oregon Convention Center, Portland, Oregon, United States
- 1991 Pacifico Yokohama, Yokohama, Japan
- 1993 Pennsylvania Convention Center, Philadelphia, Pennsylvania, United States
- 1995 Brisbane Convention & Exhibition Centre, Brisbane, Australia
- 1995 Suntec Singapore Convention and Exhibition Centre, Singapore
- 1996 Salt Palace, Salt Lake City, Utah, United States
- 1996 World Trade Center Metro Manila, Pasay, Philippines
- 1997 Tokyo International Forum, Tokyo, Japan
- 1998 Hawaii Convention Center, Hinolulu, Hawaii
- 1999 Singapore Expo, Singapore

=== 21st-century exhibition halls ===
- 2000 Excel London, London, England
- 2001 Bethlehem Convention Palace, Bethlehem
- 2001 Busan Exhibition and Convention Center, Busan, South Korea
- 2003 Walter E. Washington Convention Center, Washington, D.C., United States
- 2004 Gold Coast Convention and Exhibition Centre, Gold Coast, Australia
- 2007 SMX Convention Center Manila, Pasay, Philippines
- 2008 China National Convention Center, Beijing, China
- 2008 BT Convention Centre, Liverpool, England
- 2008 Raleigh Convention Center, Raleigh, North Carolina, United States
- 2008 Taipei Nangang Exhibition Center, Taipei, Taiwan
- 2009 Vancouver Convention Centre, Vancouver, British Columbia, Canada
- 2010 Convention Centre Dublin, Dublin, Ireland
- 2012 Convention Center Poet Ronaldo Cunha Lima, João Pessoa, Brazil
- 2014 Kaohsiung Exhibition Center, Kaohsiung, Taiwan
- 2015 Iloilo Convention Center, Iloilo, Philippines
- 2016 International Convention Centre Sydney, Sydney, Australia
- 2017 AU Convention Center, Visakhapatnam, India
- 2017 SPICE Convention Centre, Malaysia
- 2021 Rudraksha Convention Center, Varanasi, India
- 2021 Bangabandhu Bangladesh–China Friendship Exhibition Center, Dhaka, Bangladesh
- 2023 Bharat Mandapam, Delhi, India
- 2023 Yashobhoomi, Delhi, India
- 2024 Taoyuan Convention and Exhibition Center, Taoyuan City, Taiwan

== Image gallery ==
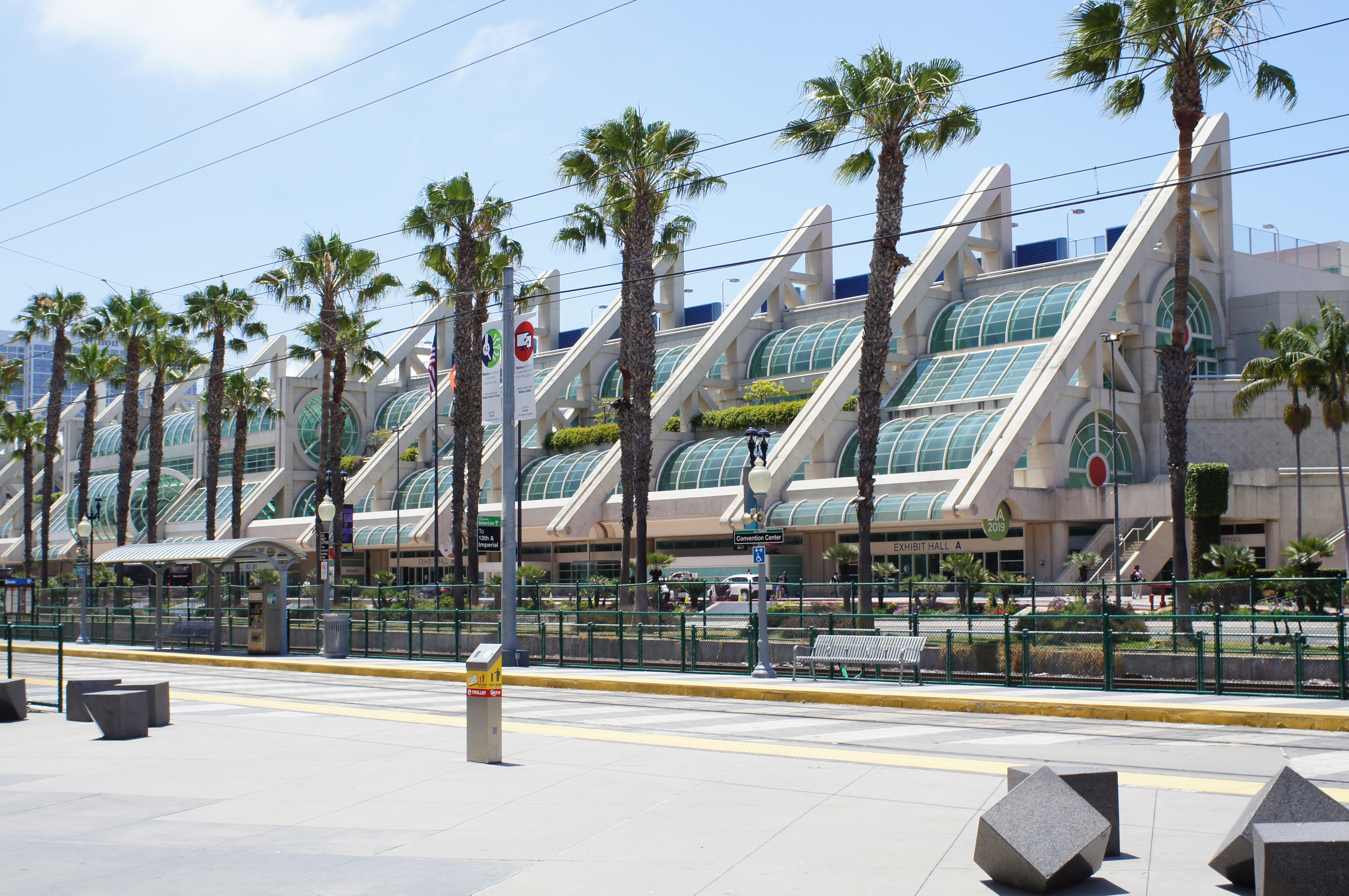
San Diego Convention Center, one of the largest in North America and home to the annual San Diego Comic-Con

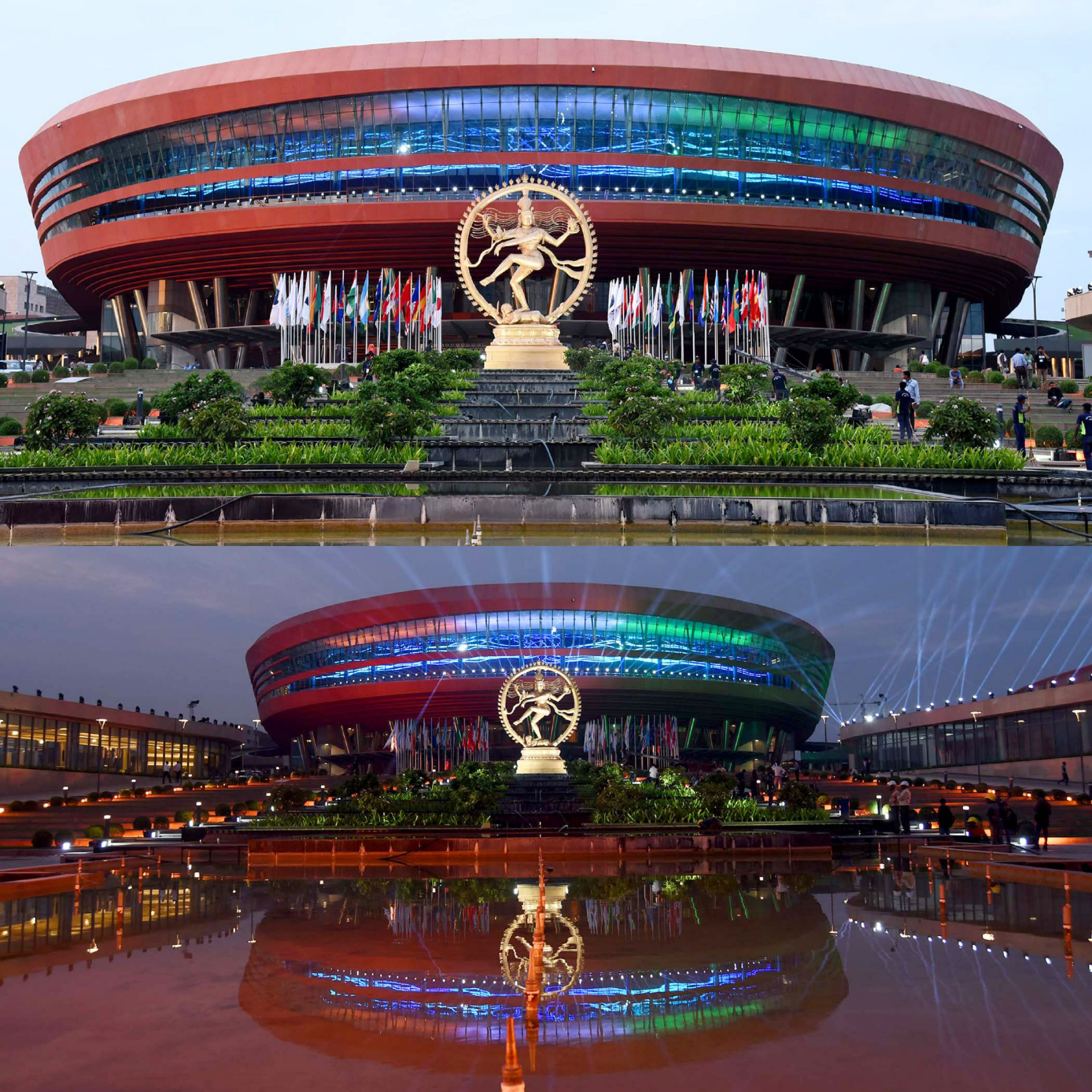
Bharat Mandapam International Exhibition-cum-Convention Centre (IECC) in New Delhi, India

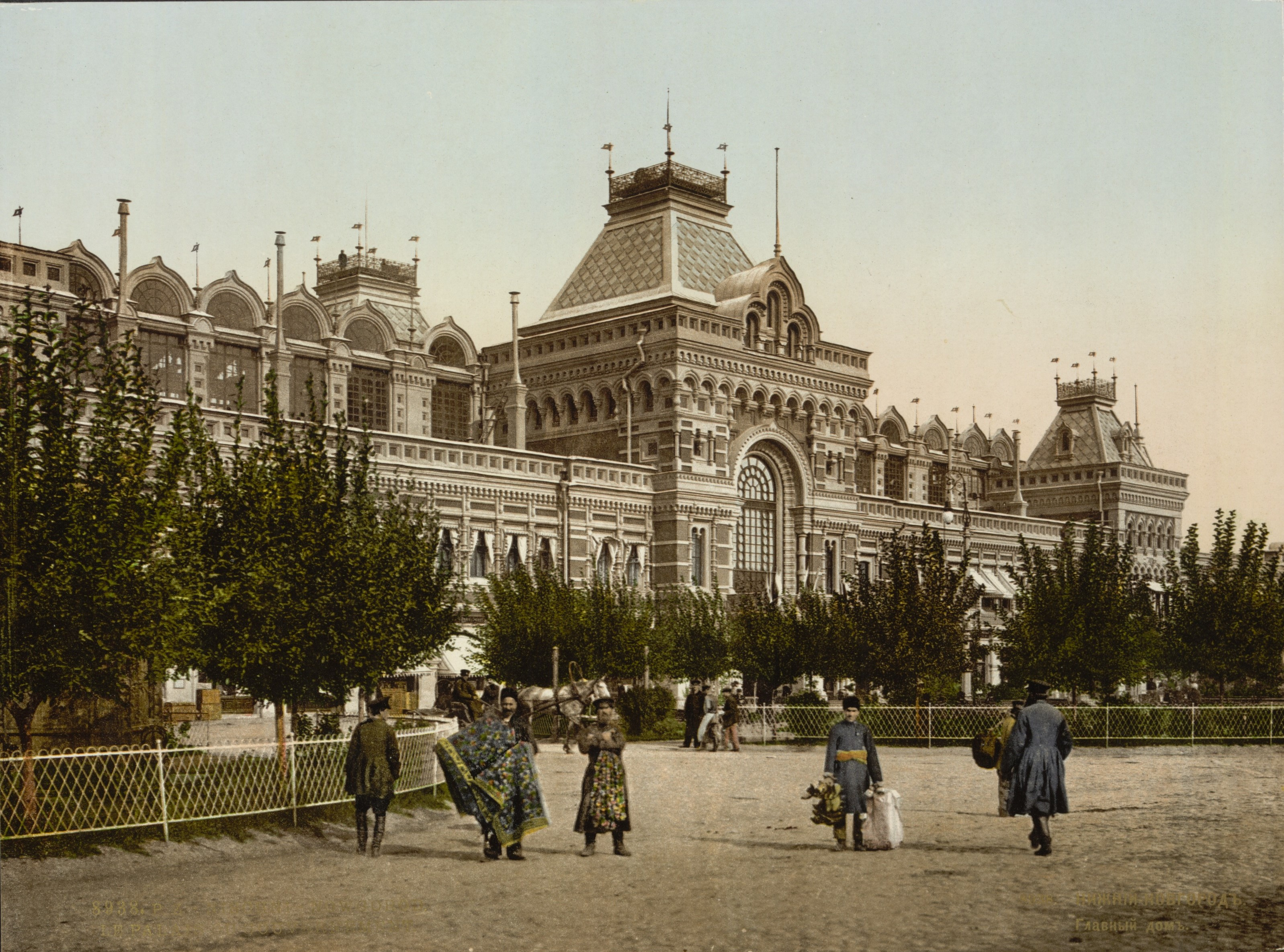
Exhibition Hall of the Makaryev Fair

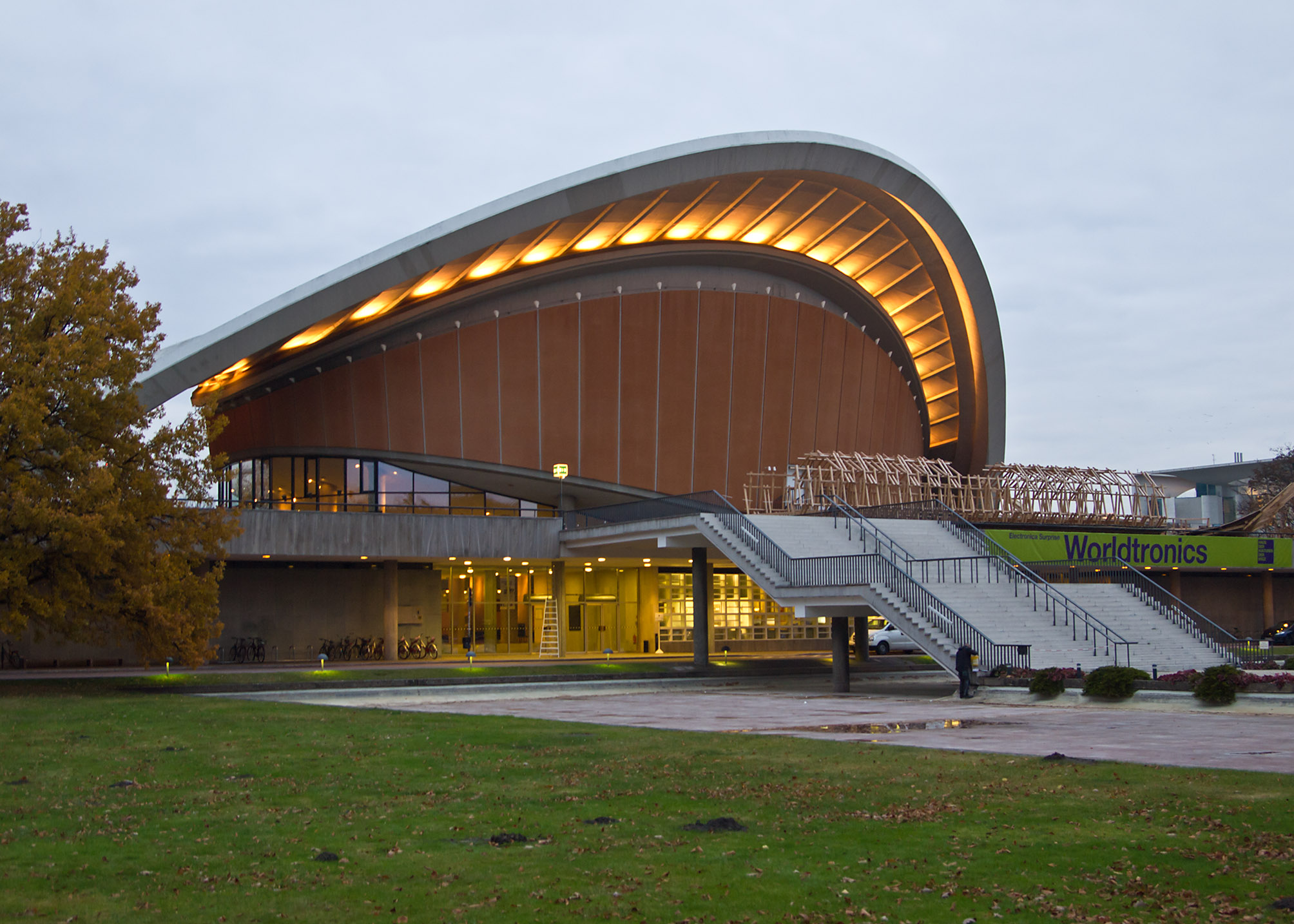
Kongresshalle Berlin – House of the Cultures of the World

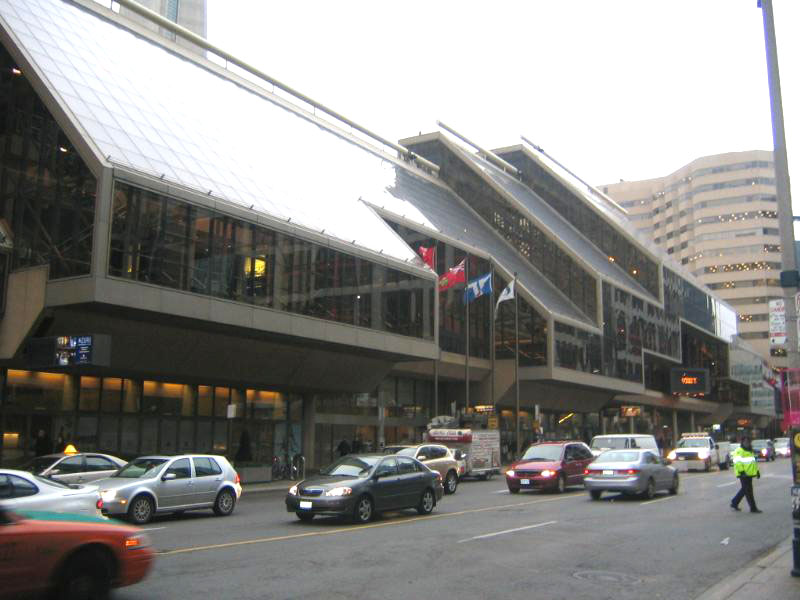
Metro Toronto Convention Centre

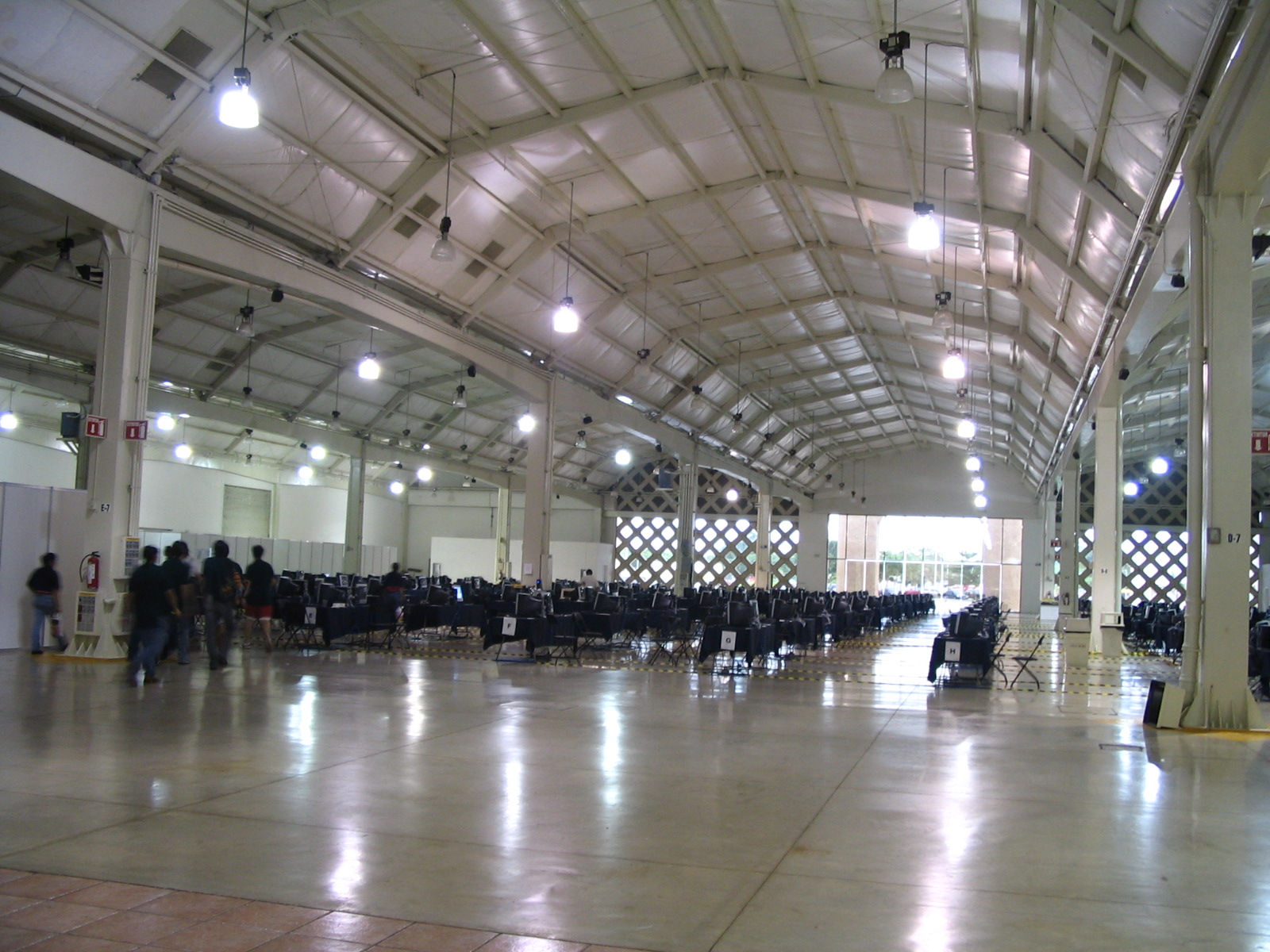
Siglo XXI Convention Centre in Mérida, Mexico

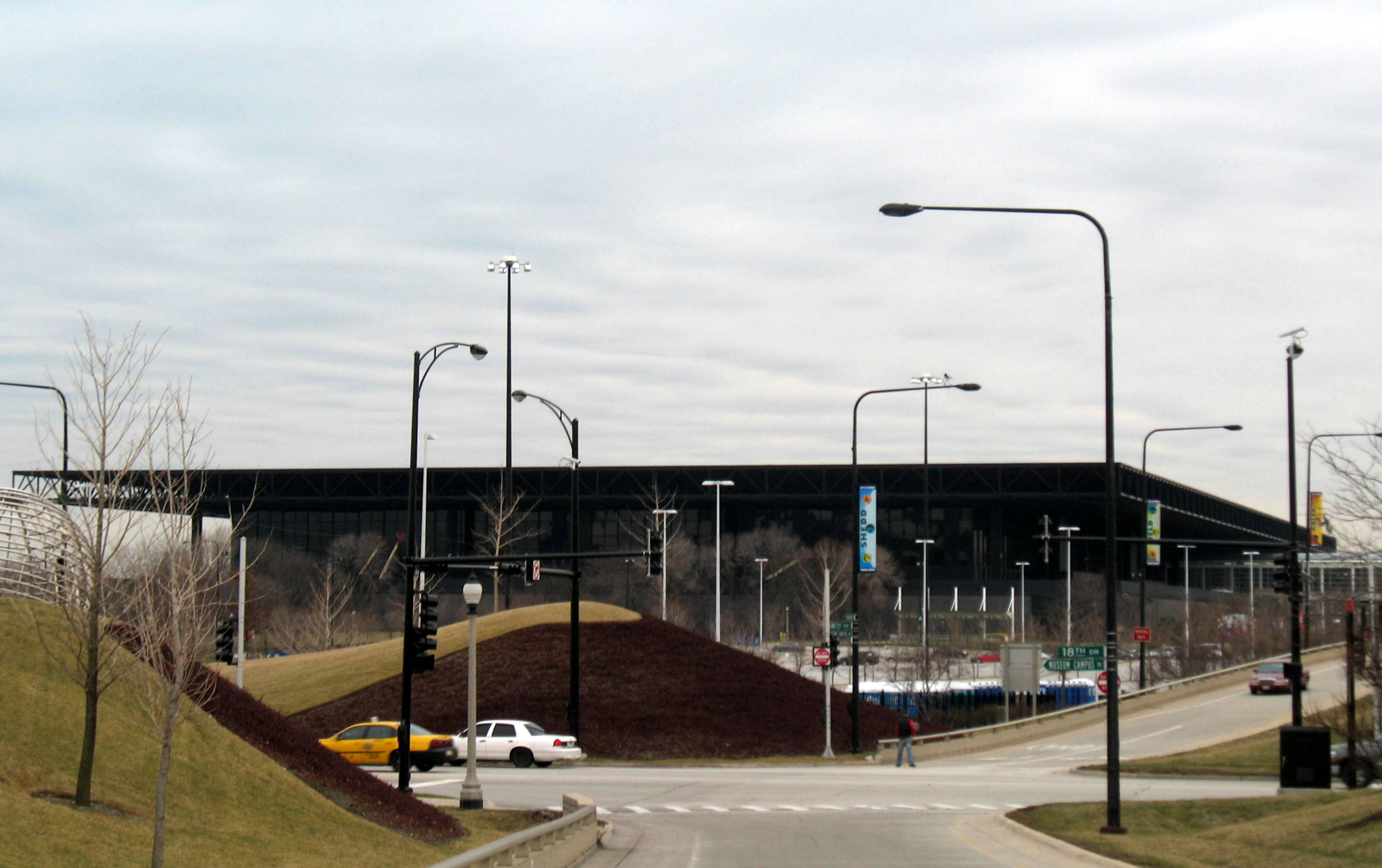
McCormick Place in Chicago, the largest Convention center in North America

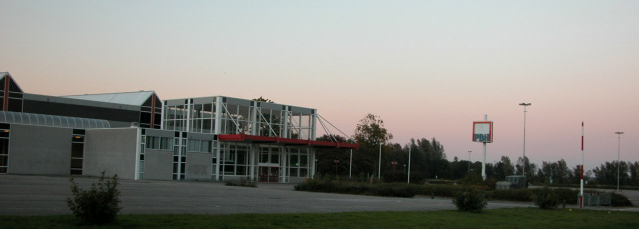
The back entrance of the PBH convention center in Zuidlaren, Netherlands

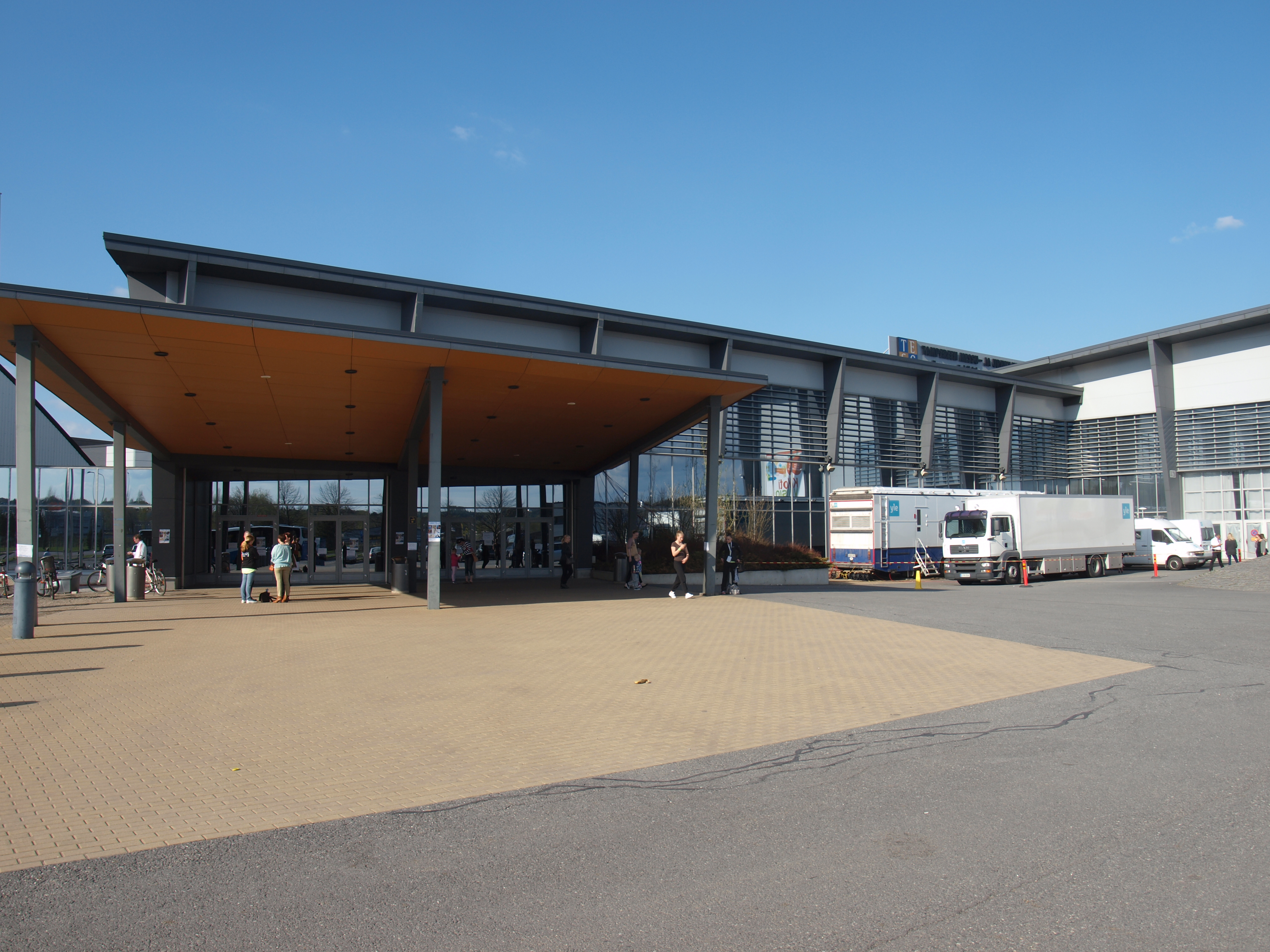
The entrance to the Pirkkahalli sports arena at the Tampere Exhibition and Sports Centre in Tampere, Finland

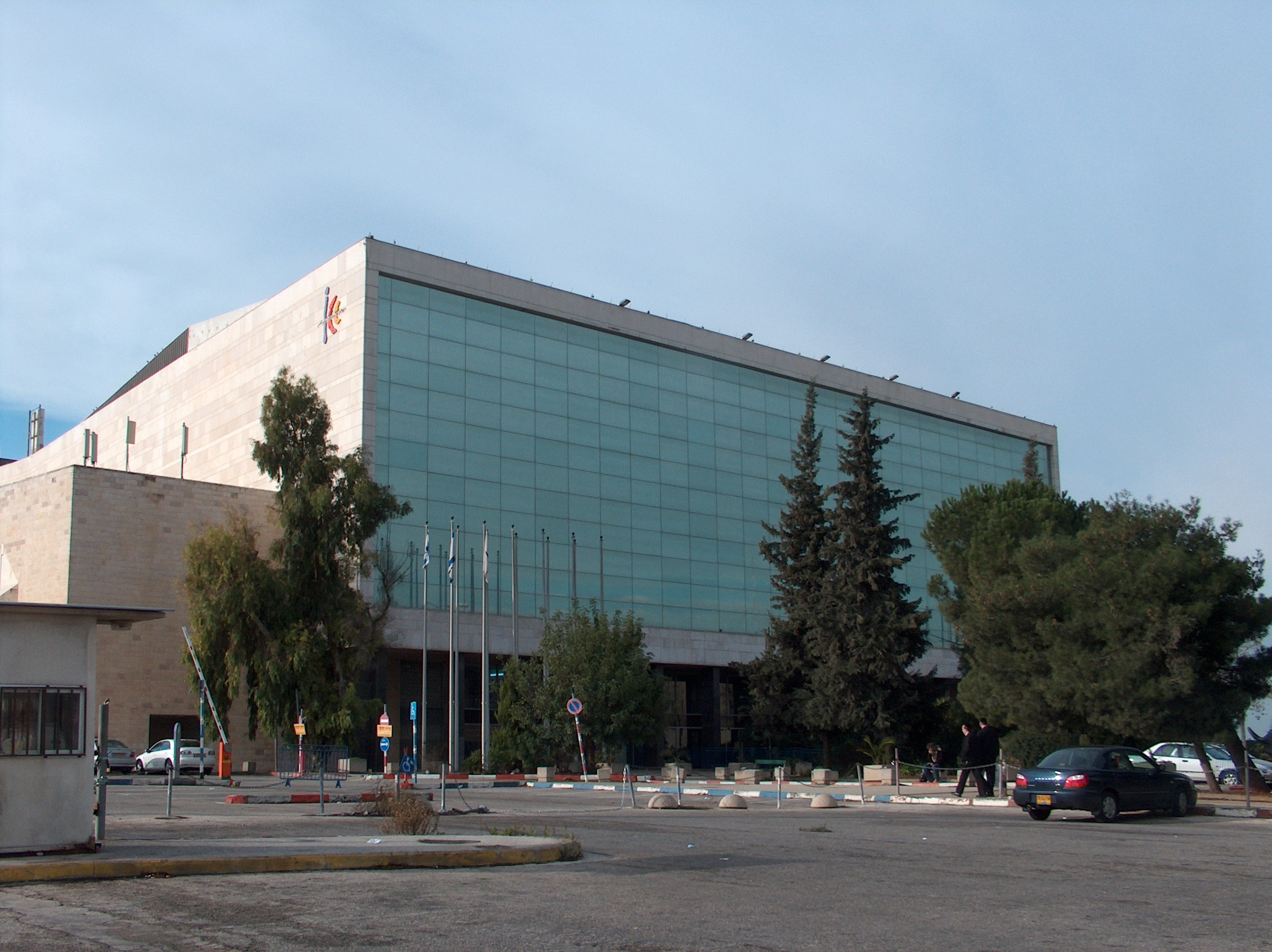
Jerusalem International Convention Center

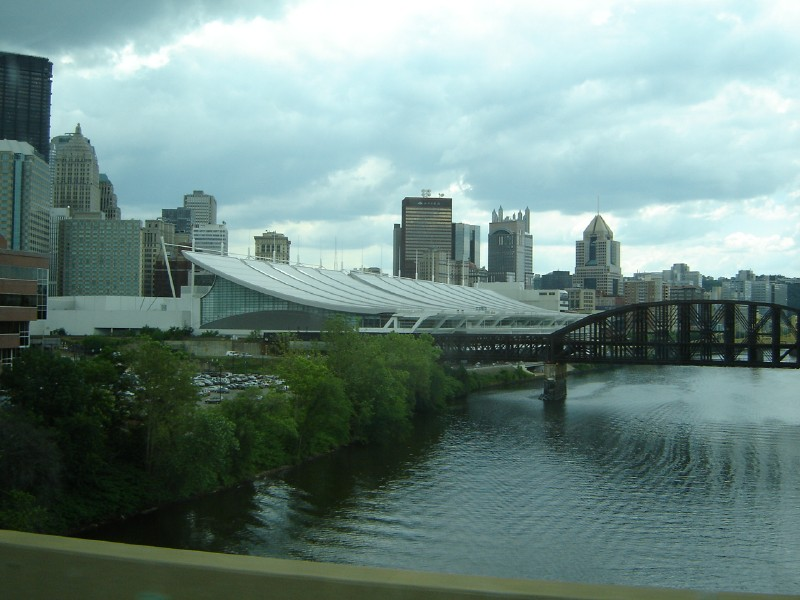
Pittsburgh's David L. Lawrence Convention Center, the first LEED-certified convention center in North America

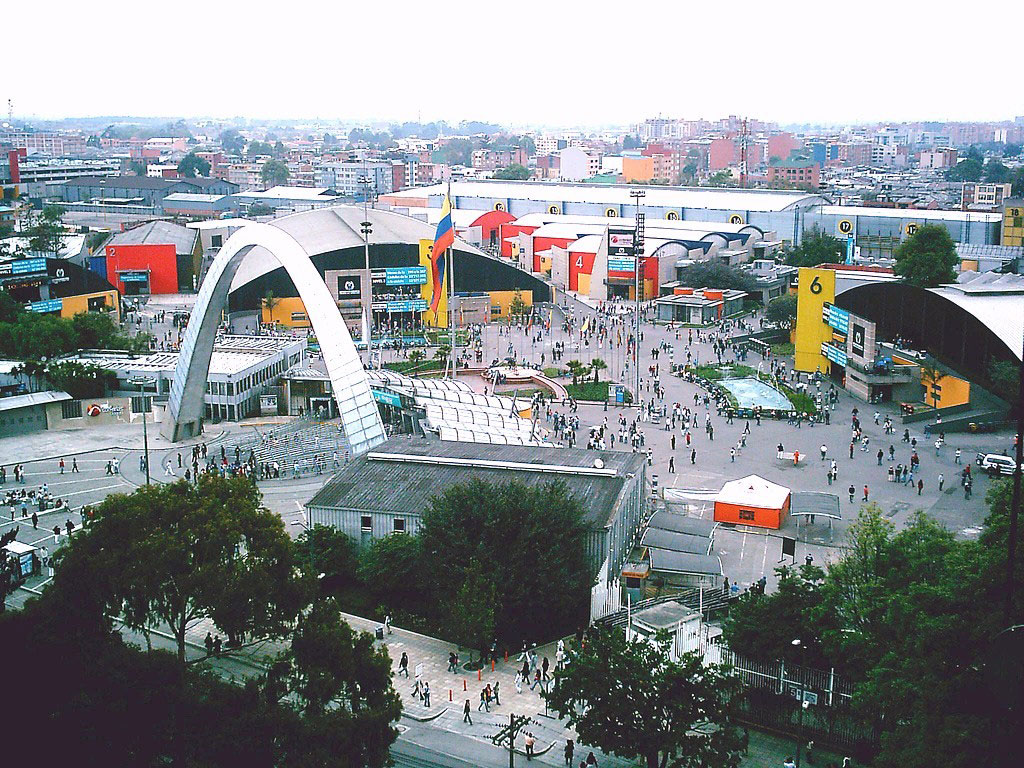
Corferias Exposition Center in Bogotá, Colombia

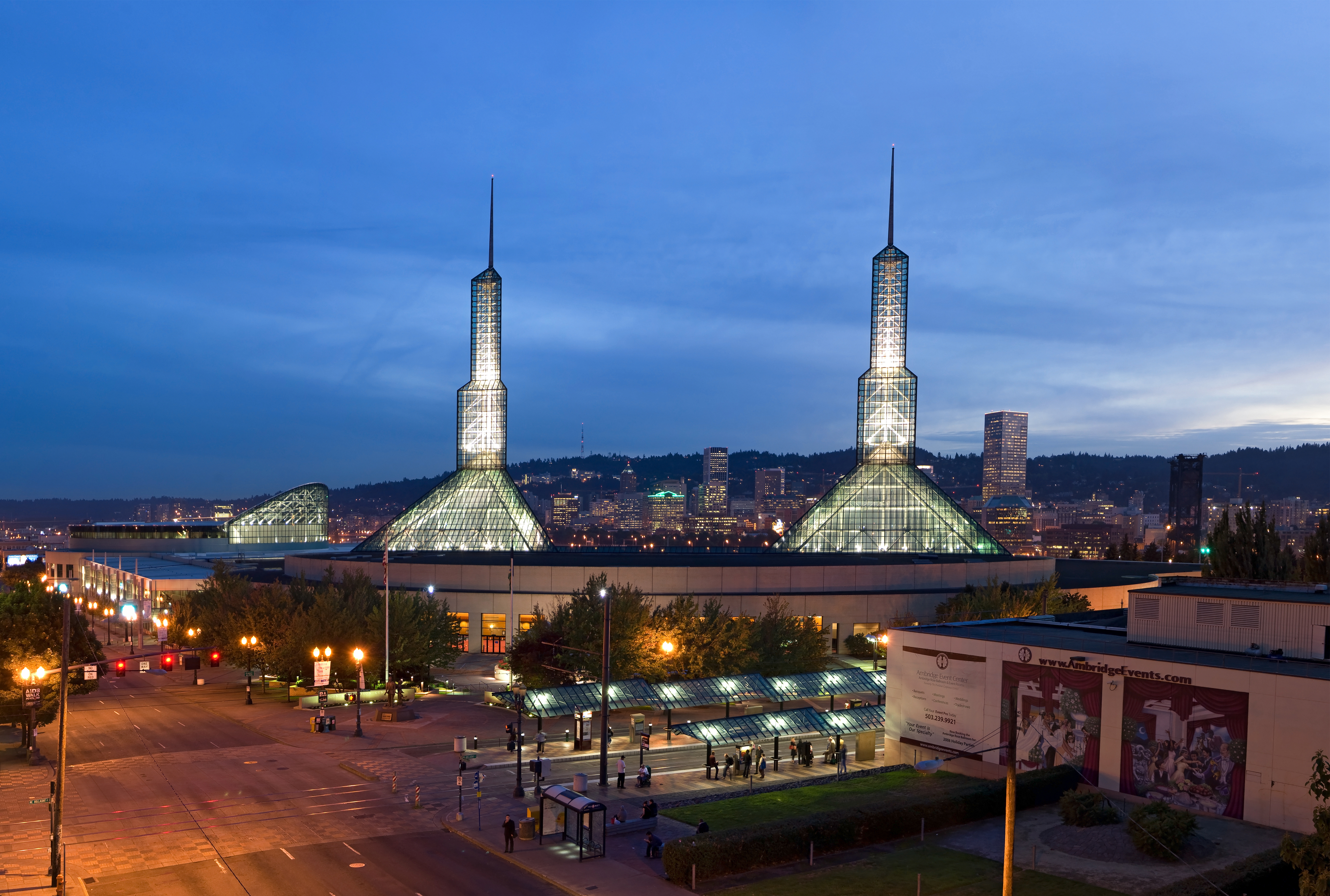
Oregon Convention Center in Portland, Oregon

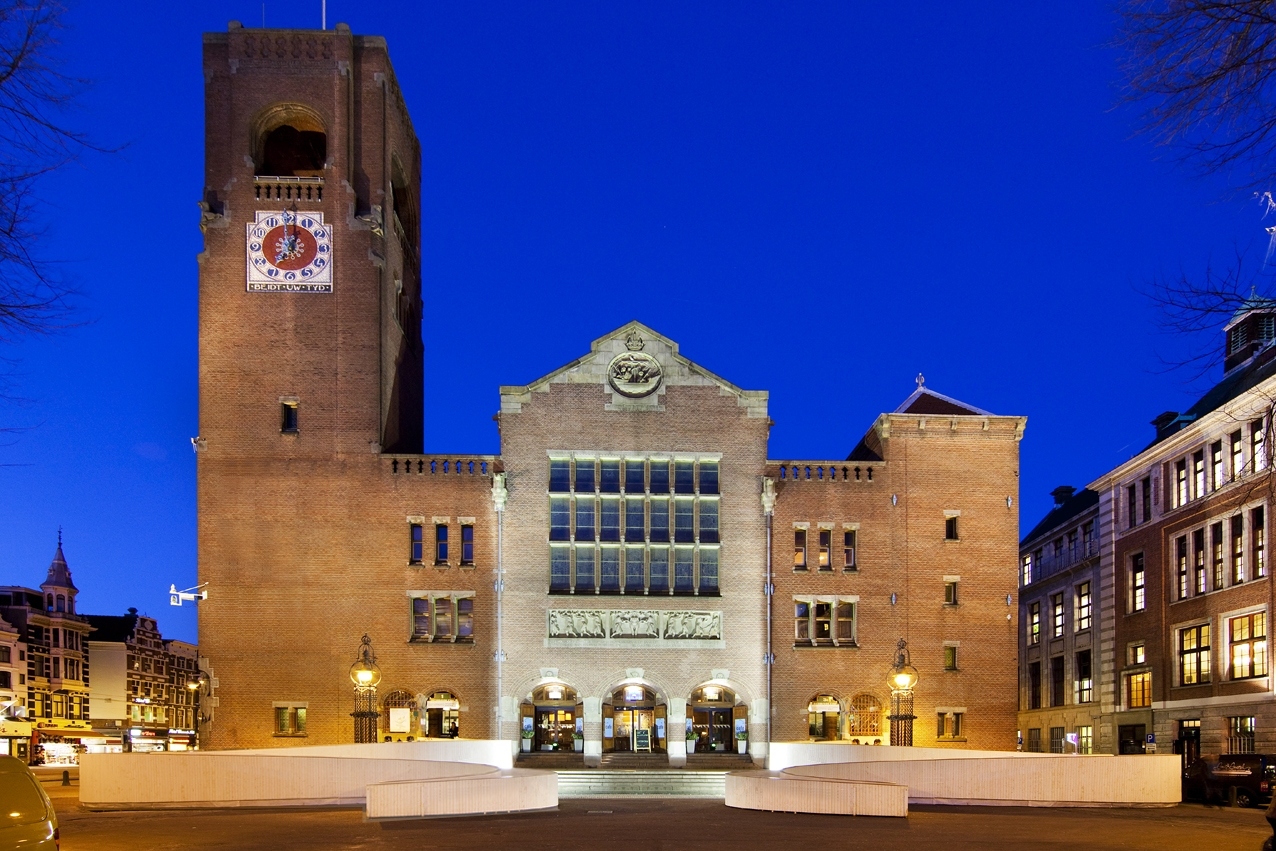
Beurs van Berlage convention center Amsterdam, the Netherlands

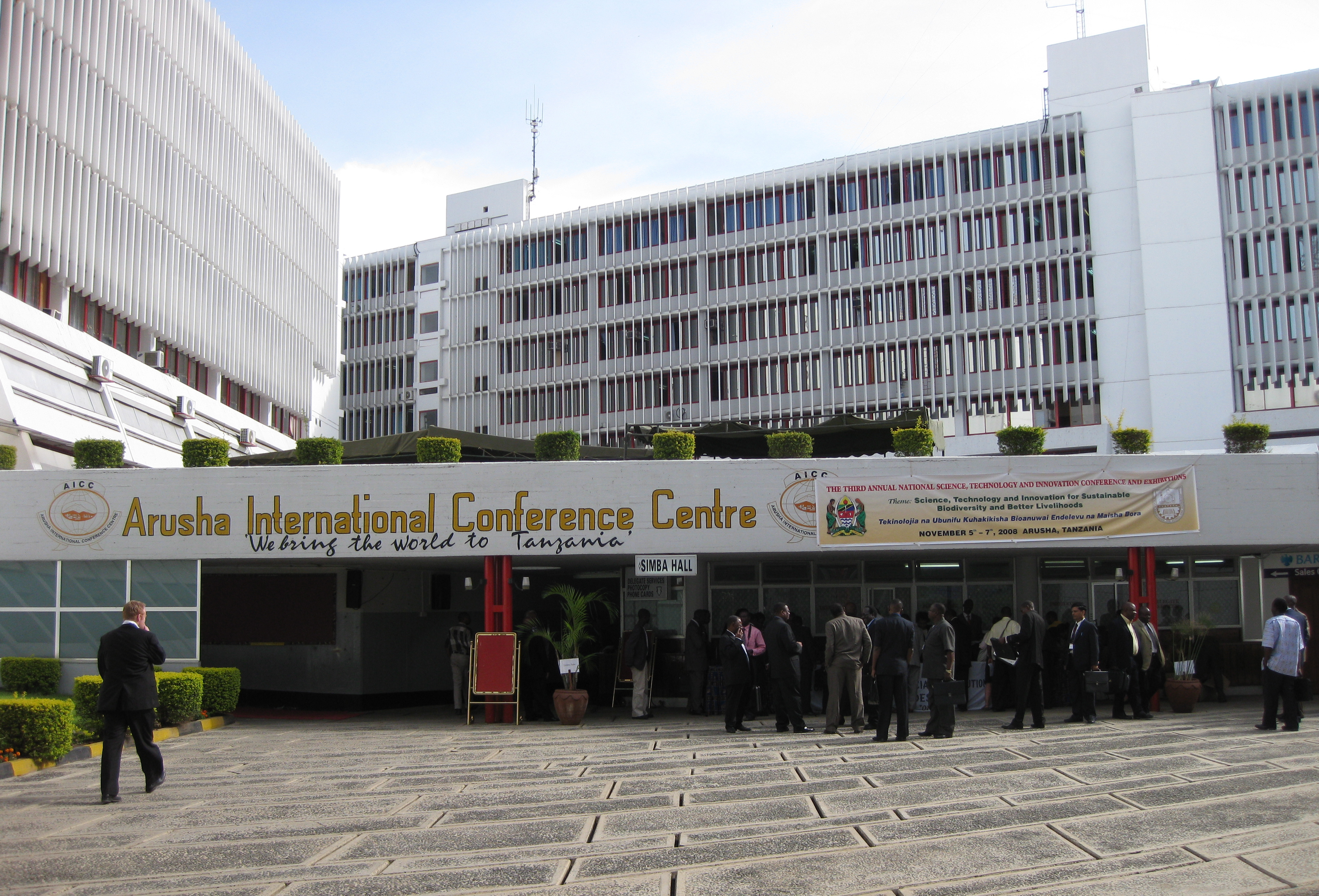
Arusha International Conference Centre Arusha, Tanzania

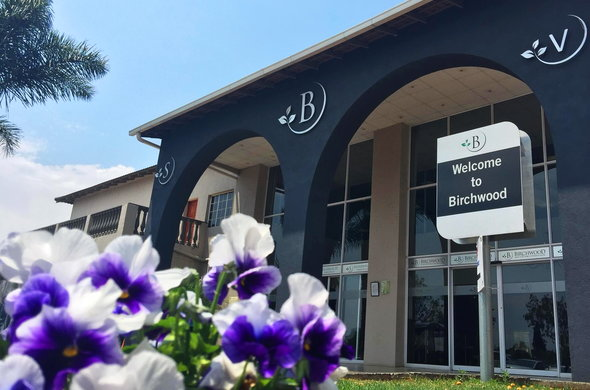
Birchwood Conference Centre, Johannesburg

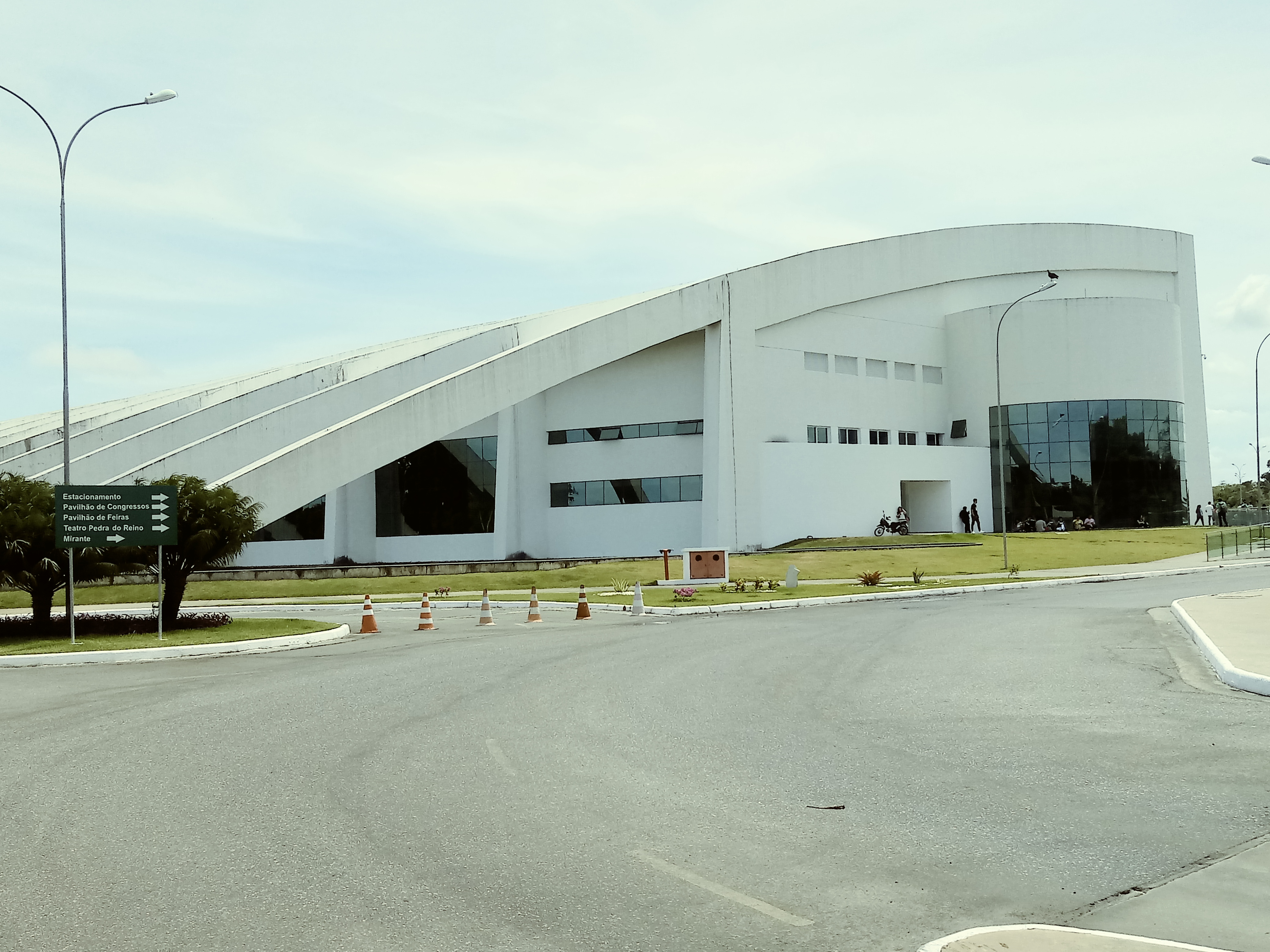
Convention Center Poet Ronaldo Cunha Lima in João Pessoa

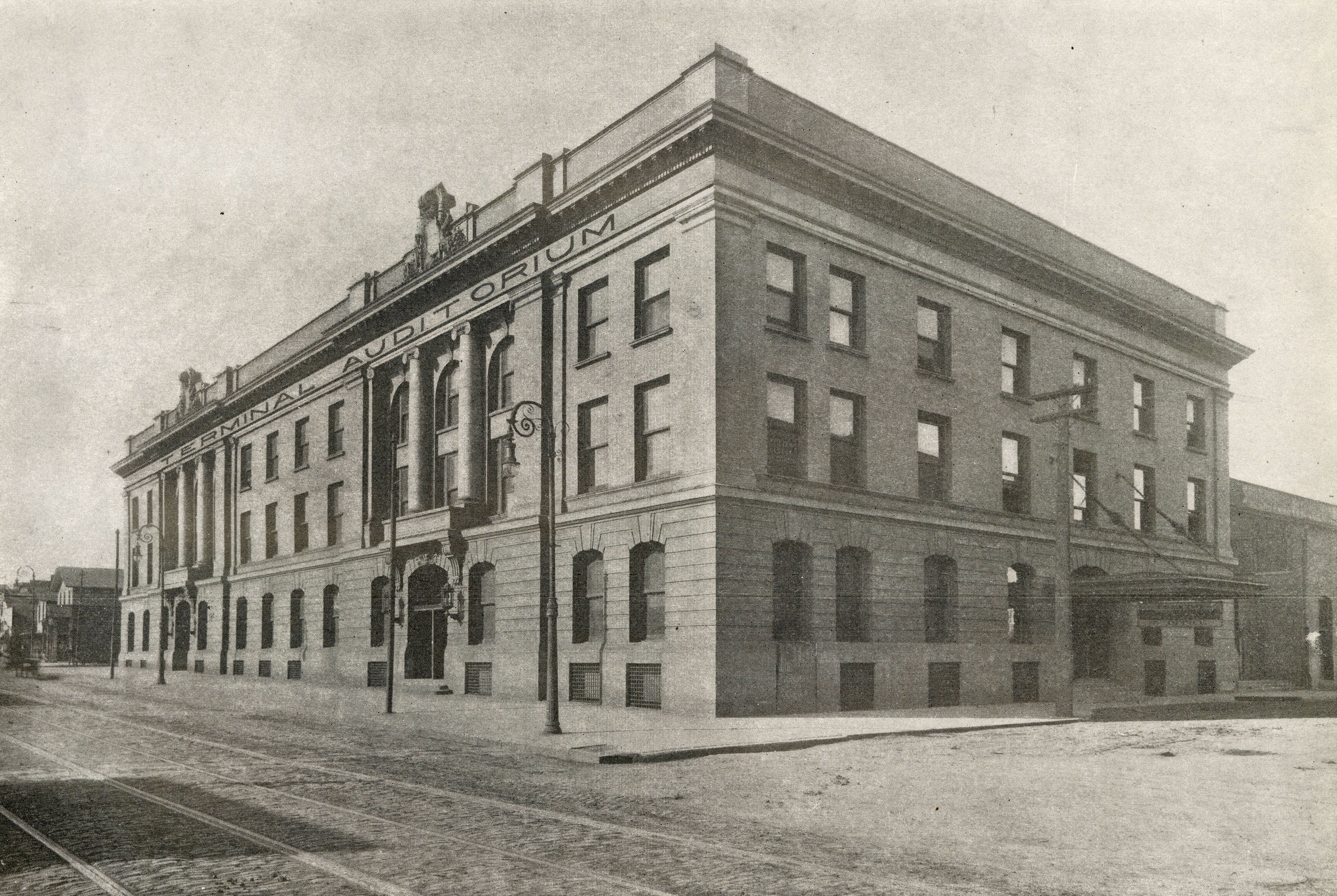
The Terminal Auditorium, an early 20th century convention center in Toledo, Ohio

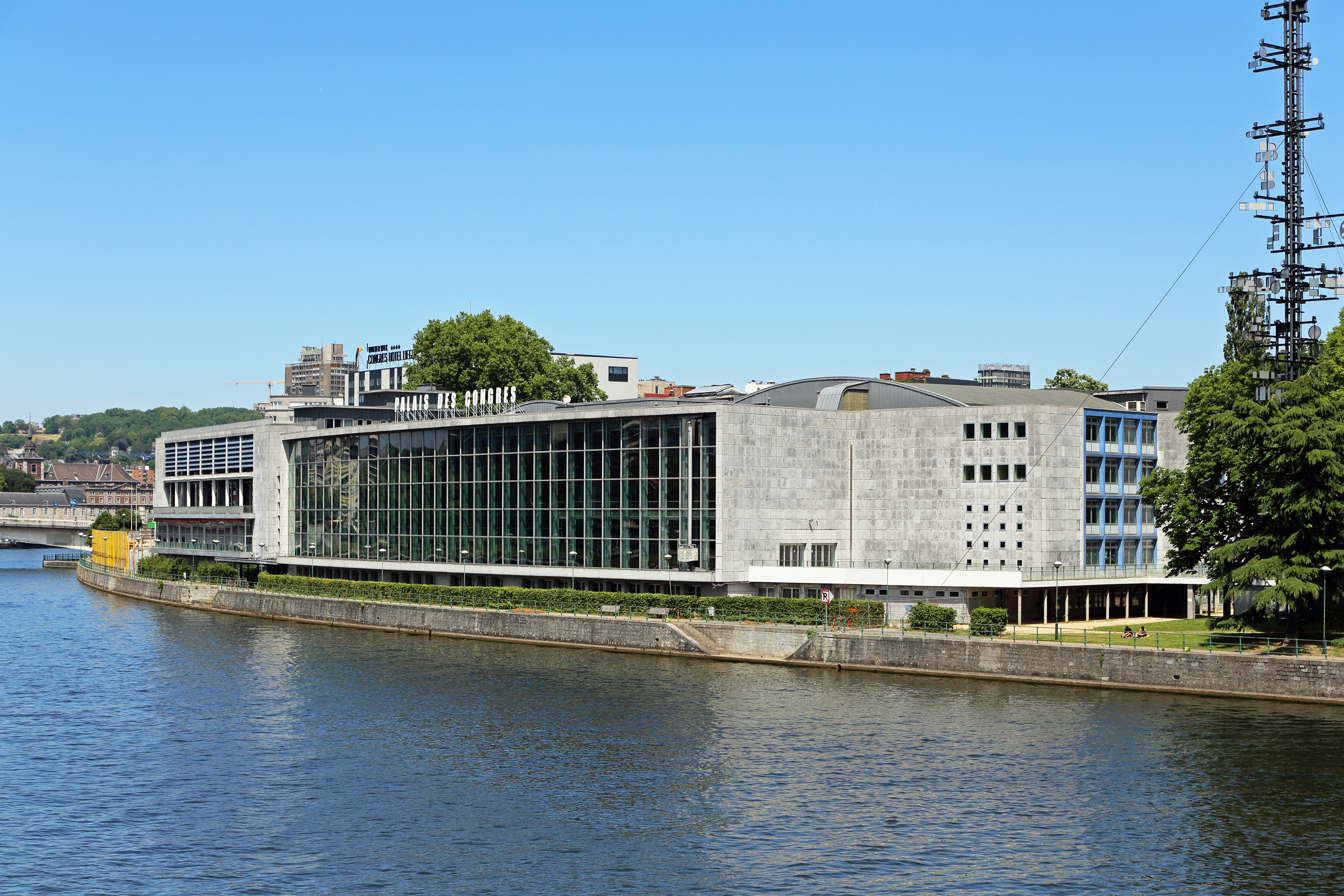
Congress center (Palais des Congrès) in Liège, Belgium

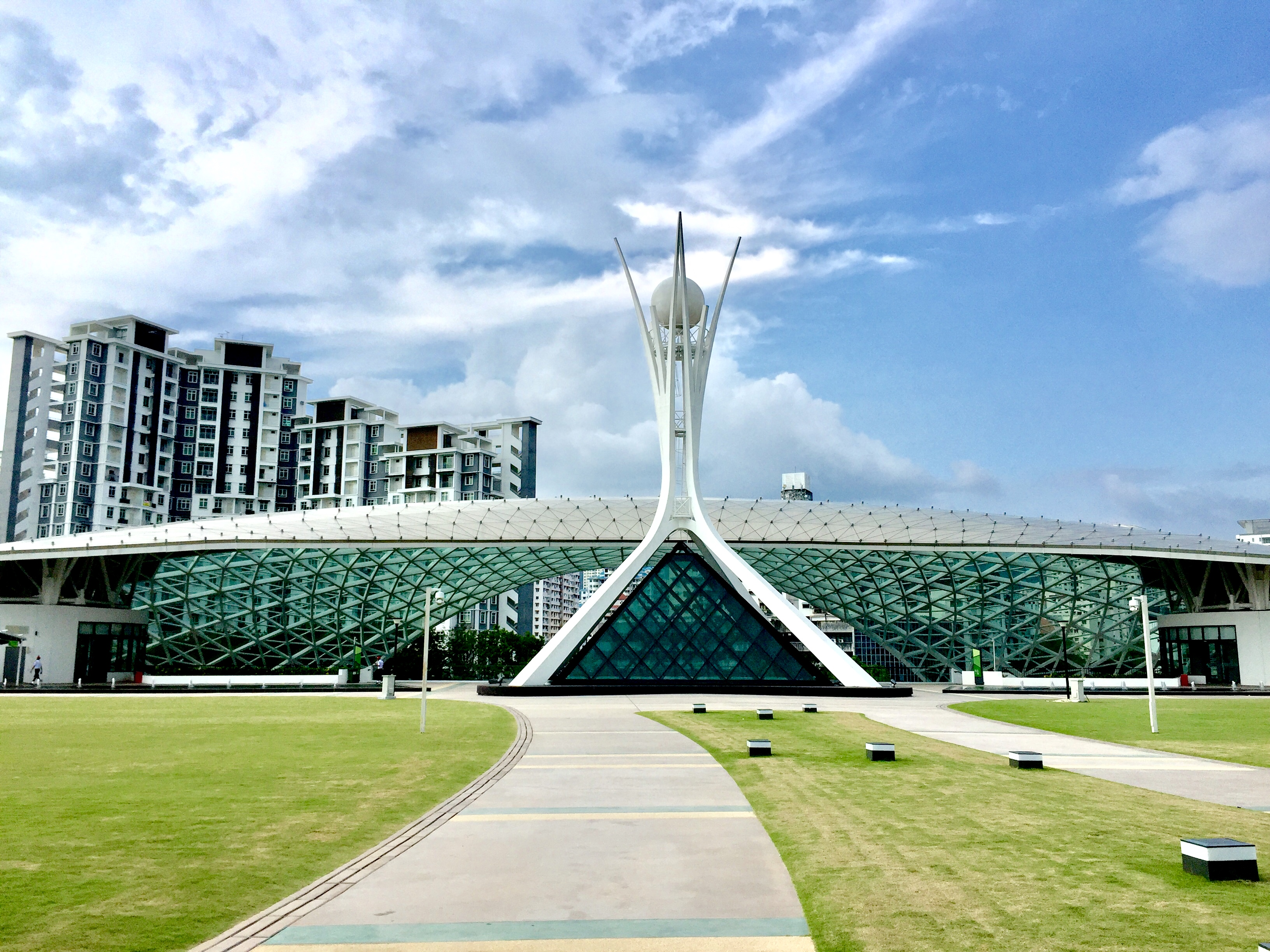
SPICE Convention Centre in George Town, Penang, Malaysia

== See also ==
- Palais des Congrès (disambiguation)
- Stadium
- List of convention and exhibition centers
- List of convention centers named after people
