= Ganime =

Ganime may refer to:

- Ganime (ガニメ), a fictional kaiju from the Japanese science fiction film Space Amoeba
- G-Anime, an anime convention held every year in Gatineau, Quebec, Canada
- Ga-nime (画ニメ), a project initiated in 2006 by the Japanese publisher Gentosha and the animation studio Toei Animation that features still-animated films
