= AU Convention Center =

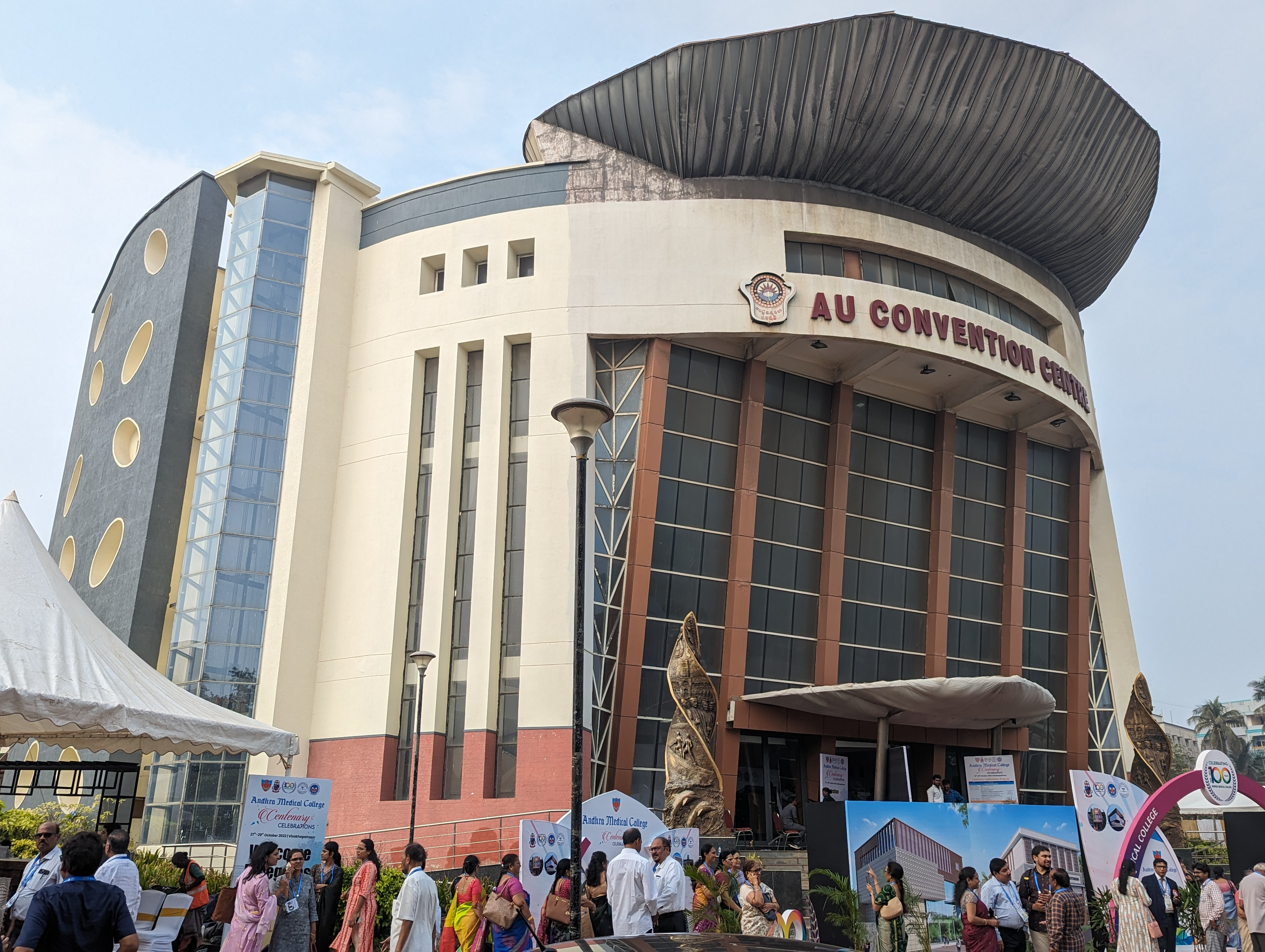
- Front view of the building
- Interactive map of AU Convention Center
- Address: HPCL Colony, Pandurangapuram, Visakhapatnam, Andhra Pradesh 530003
- Coordinates: 17.717938°N 83.328520°E

Construction
- Built: 2011–2017
- Opened: 9 December 2017

AU Convention Center is a convention at Beach road, Pandurangapuram, Visakhapatnam it was inaugurated in the year of 2017 by Vice-President of India Venkaiah Naidu.

== About ==
The building was designed by the Architecture Alumni Association, Department of Architecture, Andhra University. The front facade resembles water bubbles and the roof is inspired by tortoise shell. It cost ₹13.5-crore to construct and seating capacity is of 2000 seats.
