= G-Anime =

Anime convention in Gatineau, Quebec, Canada

- G-Anime's logo
- Status: Active
- Venue: Palais des congrès de Gatineau; Four Points Sheraton Gatineau
- Locations: Gatineau, Quebec
- Country: Canada
- Inaugurated: 2009
- Attendance: 2,200 in 2014
- Organizer: La Société d'Animation Japonaise de Gatineau (SAJG)
- Website: http://www.ganime.ca/

G-Anime is an annual weekend anime convention held in late January in Gatineau, Quebec, Canada at the Palais des congrès de Gatineau and the Four Points Sheraton Gatineau. The convention is run and organized by La Société d'Animation Japonaise de Gatineau (SAJG)^{α}.

== Programming ==
G-Anime's events, attractions and activities, just like most other anime conventions, include a Dealers Room and an Artists Alley, anime screenings, panels and workshops, AMV contests, game shows, cosplay events (Masquerade, Cosplay Chess, Fashion Show, etc.), and video games stations (Gaming Room).

== History ==
The idea for a new anime convention started when an organization called SOAP^{b} announced in summer 2008 that the 4th edition of their convention AC-Cubed^{c} was cancelled. In an effort to replace the local convention (AC-Cubed was in Ottawa, which along with Gatineau, are part of the National Capital Region of Canada), G-Anime was created. The convention's first edition was held on February 7–8, 2009.

Starting in 2012, G-Anime was held on 3 days and featured 24-hour programming (overnight at the Four Points Sheraton hotel). Starting in 2015, the convention started holding a multi-day convention in the summer in addition to the winter convention.

=== Event history ===
Dates	Location	Attendance	Guests
February 7–8, 2009	Palais des congrès de Gatineau; Gatineau, Quebec	828	Maral "Sarcasm-hime" Agnerian, Anne-Marie Morin Bérard, Marc Bellier, Brigade SnW, Benoît Cécyre, Lucie Fontaine, Hubert Gagnon, Julien Mathern, Dawn "Kaijugal" McKechnie, Charles Mohapel, and Stéphanie Rivard.
February 6–7, 2010	Palais des congrès de Gatineau; Gatineau, Quebec	1,029	Adaptations GJ, Maral "Sarcasm-hime" Agnerian, Anne-Marie Morin Bérard, Catherine Bonneau, Brigade SnW, Hubert Corriveau, François-Nicolas Dolan, Ed the Sock, Lucie Fontaine, Liana K, David Laurin, Julien Mathern, Dawn "Kaijugal" McKechnie, Charles Mohapel, Sébastien Reding, Stéphane Rivard, Nicholas Savard-L'Herbier, David Stephenson, Ontario Anime Society.
February 5–6, 2011	Palais des congrès de Gatineau; Gatineau, Quebec	1,267	Alison Acton, Maral "Sarcasm-hime" Agnerian, Marie Bilodeau, Brigade SnW, Benoît Cécyre, Hubert Corriveau, Ricky Dick, Patrick Gilliland, Liana K, Kyowa Québec, Julien Mathern, Dawn "Kaijugal" McKechnie, DJ Midli Charles Mohapel, Jay Odjick, Laurence "Pomme" Perreault, Adam Smith.
January 27–29, 2012	Palais des congrès de Gatineau; Four Points Sheraton Gatineau; Gatineau, Quebec	1,486 (estimated)	Marie Bilodeau, Brigade SnW, Benoît Cécyre, Victoria "Vickybunnyangel" Chin, Lee Ann Farruga, Samuel "FullmetalSam" Lachance, Alexandre Lalancette, Michaël Larouche, Julien Mathern, Krystal "Kudrel" Messier, DJ Midli, Charles Mohapel, Jay Odjick, Laurence "Pomme" Perreault, Pinku! Project, Frank Pitiot, Géraldine "GebGeb" Robert] Adam Smith, David Stephenson, Christine "Criic" Turcotte, Elise Vézina-Easey, René Walling.
January 25–27, 2013	Palais des congrès de Gatineau; Four Points Sheraton Gatineau; Gatineau, Quebec	1,862 (estimated)	The 404s, L'Académie des chasseurs de primes, Jackie Berger (French Guest of Honor), J-F Bibeau, Marie Bilodeau, Benoît Cécyre, Hubert Corriveau, Megan "MeltingMirror" Elle, Sam "Painxsorrow" Farman (canceled), Suzie "Suki" Girard, Mel Gosselin, Terri Hawkes (English Guest of Honor), Irulanne, Geneviève "CelticSakura" La Haye, Melissa "Jusdepomme" Langlois, Michaël Larouche, Julien Mathern, DJ Midli, Charles Mohapel, Mark Nguyen, UchuSentai:Noiz (Japanese Guests of Honor), Jay Odjick, Lindsay Anne "Dart: Dense Boy" Pattillo] Laurence "Pomme" Perreault, Pinku! Project, David Stephenson, Jolie Stripes, Christine "Criic" Turcotte, Elise Vézina-Easey, Olivier Visentin.
January 24–26, 2014	Palais des congrès de Gatineau; Four Points Sheraton Gatineau; Gatineau, Quebec	2,200 (estimated)	Joueur du Grenier (French Guest of Honor), Thierry Bourdon (French Guest of Honor), L'Orchestre de jeux vidéos (OJV), Testeur Alpha, Press Start 2 Play, HOSHI*FURU, The 404s, Jolie Stripes (cancelled), Frederick "Frederick Käppel" Dalpé, Raphael "Bloody Funeral" Desruisseaux, DeAnna "It's Raining Neon" Davis] Kitsurie Yuki, Hubert Corriveau, Michaël Larouche, Stephanie "Cadney" Medeiros, Christine "Criic" Turcotte, Laurence "Pomme" Perreault, Julien Mathern, J-F Bibeau, Charles Mohapel, DJ Midli, Elise Vézina-Easey, Yves Bourgelas, Jay Odjick, Marie Bilodeau.
January 23–25, 2015	Palais des congrès de Gatineau; Four Points Sheraton Gatineau; Gatineau, Quebec		Benzaie, Charles Mohapel, Christine Turcotte, Doug Walker, DJ Midli, Elise Vézina-Easey, Jay Odjick, Jean-François Bibeau, Julien Mathern, Laurence Perreault, Marie Bilodeau, Melissa Langlois, Michaël Larouche, Stephanie Medeiros, Testeur Alpha, The 404s, Yves Bourgelas.
July 18–19, 2015	Palais des congrès de Gatineau; Four Points Sheraton Gatineau; Gatineau, Quebec		Fréderic Molas, Jay Odjick, Laurence Perreault, Luduc, Marie Bilodeau, Michaël Larouche, Testeur Alpha, Yves Bourgelas
January 22–24, 2016	Palais des congrès de Gatineau; Four Points Sheraton Gatineau; Gatineau, Quebec		Christine Turcotte, DeAnna Davis, Doctor Holocaust, Etienne Desilets-Trempe, Geneviève La Haye, Jay Odjick, Julien Mathern, Marie-Emilie Lanteigne (Kitamon Plush), Laurence Perreault, Luduc, Marie Bilodeau, MeltingMirror, Michaël Larouche, Patricia Legrand, Testeur Alpha, The 404s, Yves Bourgelas.
July 16–17, 2016	Palais des congrès de Gatineau; Four Points Sheraton Gatineau; Gatineau, Quebec		Laurence Perreault, Testeur Alpha
January 28-29, 2023	Palais des congrès de Gatineau	1500 (estimated)	

=== Chibi G-Anime ===
From 2012 through 2014, the SAJG held a 1-day convention called Chibi G-Anime on a Saturday in July at a hotel in midtown Gatineau. Featuring a reduced programming list and a smaller number of exhibitors, Chibi G-Anime caters to summer convention-goers of the Ottawa-Gatineau Area and beyond during the inter-convention period between Anime North in Toronto and Otakuthon in Montreal, a generally lull period where there are no major fan conventions in either of the 3 cities.

Dates	Location	Guests
July 7, 2012	Clarion Hotel; Gatineau, Quebec	Luduc
July 13, 2013	Quality Inn & Suites; Gatineau, Quebec	Elise Vézina-Easey, J-F Bibeau, Krystal "Kudrel" Messier, ~~Luduc~~ (cancelled).
July 26, 2014	Quality Inn & Suites; Gatineau, Quebec	Jay Odjick, Julien Mathern, Laurence Perreault, Miss Messy Mia

== Mascot ==
Gamine, G-Anime's mascot

Gamine (French for tomboy or a girl with a mischievous, boyish charm.), a play on the convention's name, was chosen as the mascot's name during the first convention by the winner of a cosplay contest where participants had to dress like her. She is recognizable by her reddish hair, her turquoise eyes and her purple clothing.

== Notes ==
^α The Gatineau Japanese Animation Society.
^b Society for Ottawa's Anime Promotion.
^c AC^{3}, or ACCC, the Anime Convention in the Capital of Canada.
