= Centro de Convenções Poeta Ronaldo Cunha Lima =

Convention center in Brazil

Convention Center Poet Ronaldo Cunha Lima
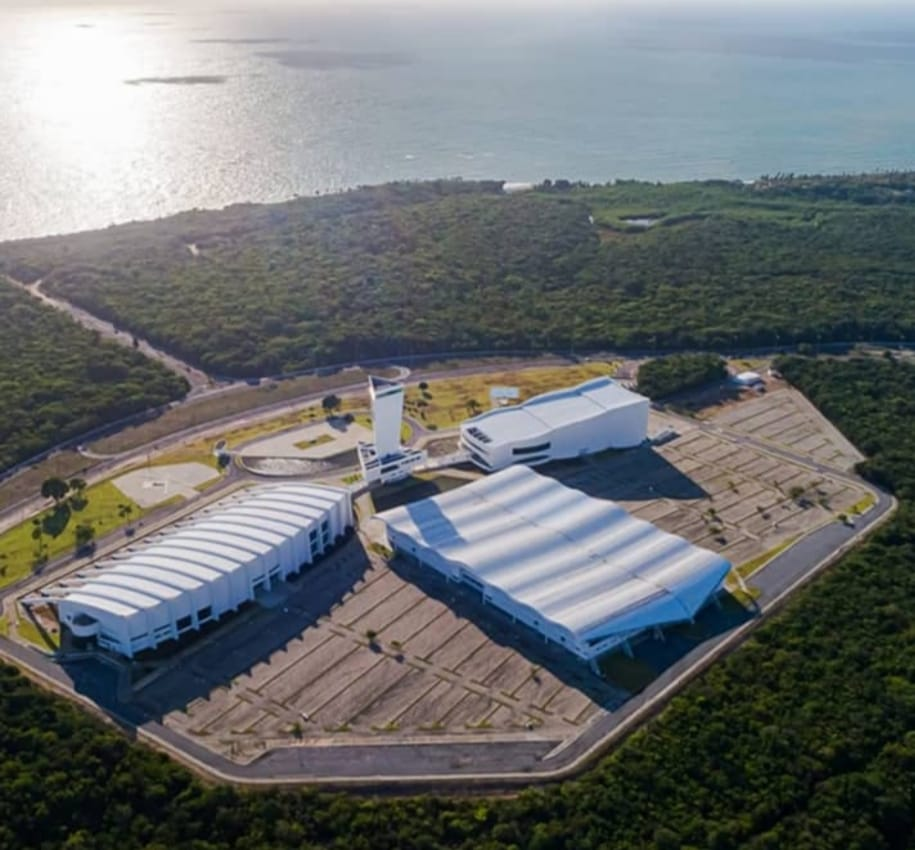
- Interactive map of Convention Center Poet Ronaldo Cunha Lima
- Former names: Convention Center of João Pessoa
- Location: PB 008, KM 5 – Pólo Ecoturístico do Cabo Branco, João Pessoa, Paraíba, Brazil
- Owner: Government of the State of Paraíba
- Capacity: 31.924

Construction
- Opened: August 26, 2012

Centro de Convenções Poeta Ronaldo Cunha Lima (English: Convention Center Poet Ronaldo Cunha Lima) located in the capital João Pessoa; was designed to be one of the most modern in Brazil, with all the necessary equipment to carry out major projects. Its structure is composed of 4 main buildings: the Mirante Tower, the Fair and Exhibition Pavilion, the Congress and Convention Hall and the Stone Theater of the Kingdom. is one of the most modern and sophisticated venues in Latin America with 48,676 m^{2}.

The name of the Convention Center is in honor of Ronaldo Cunha Lima, who was a poet, writer and politician from Paraíba, in the state and national scene.

== Structure ==
The structure of the Convention Center of João Pessoa, is composed of 4 main buildings:

- Torre do Mirante (English: lookout tower)

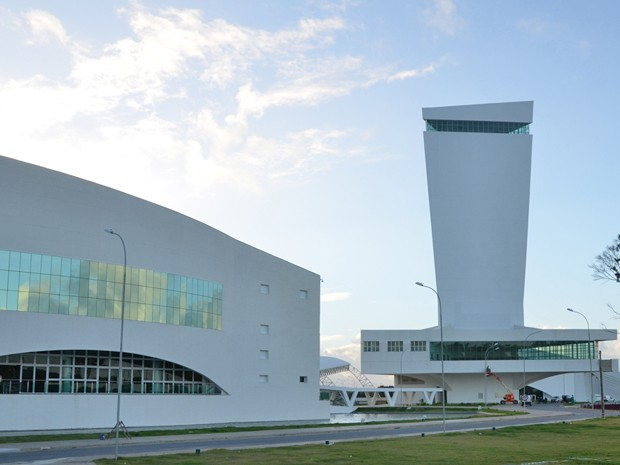
Lookout tower to the right, and the Stone Theater of the Kingdom to the left

- Teatro Pedra do Reino (English: Stone Theater of the Kingdom) :

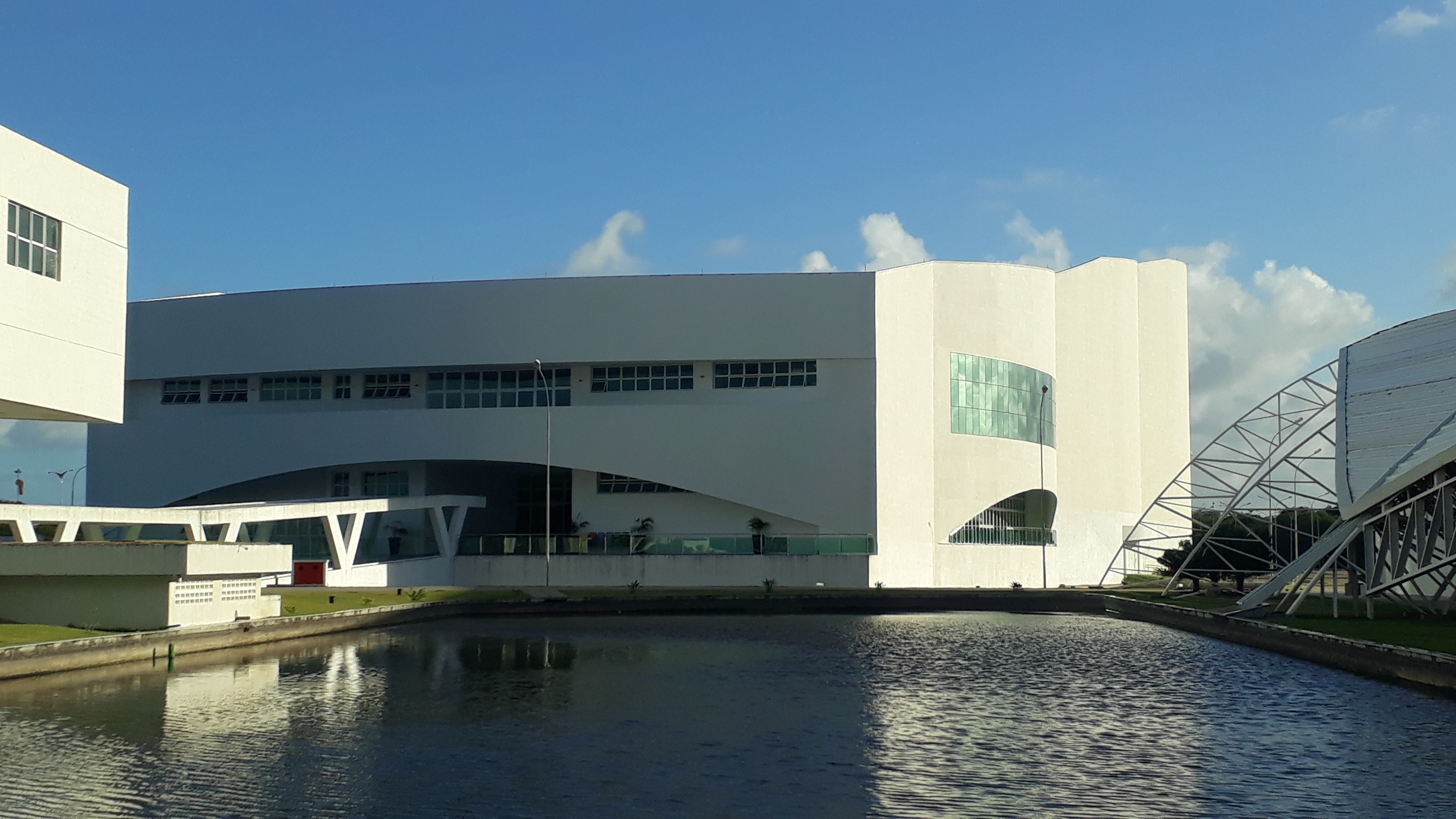
Facade of the Pedra do Reino Theater

The structure of the Pedra do Reino Theater, which is the largest theater in the Brazilian Northeast and the second largest theater in Brazil surrounds state-of-the-art sound and stage lighting. Of the 2,924 seats there are 2,820 common seats; 18 armchairs for obese people; 36 seats for people with reduced mobility and 50 seats for wheelchair users. The theater has six levels. It has shapes in curves and is composed of four volumes: entrance hall, foyer, audience and stage.

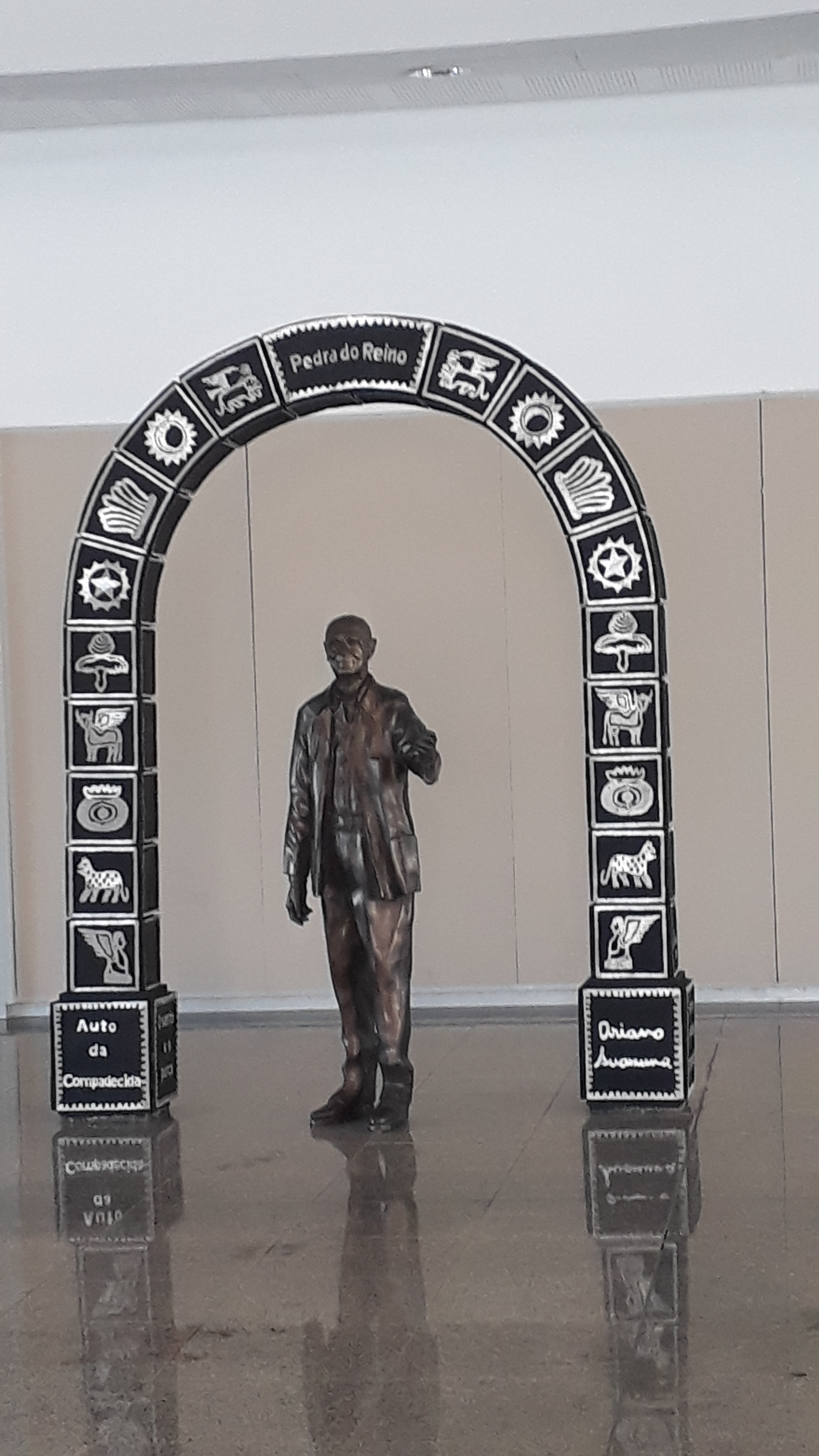
Statue of Ariano Suassuna at the Stone Kingdom Theater

The Pedra do Reino Theater has a total area of 11,763 m^{2}, of which 440 m^{2} are destined for the orchestra pit, with a liner design to facilitate the propagation of sound to the stage and audience. The capacity is for almost 3 thousand people. The name of the Theater, "The Stone of the Kingdom", was to honor the playwright of the city João Pessoa Ariano Suassuna, author of homonymous work.

- Pavilhão de Feiras e Exposições (English: Trade Fair and Exhibition Pavilion) :

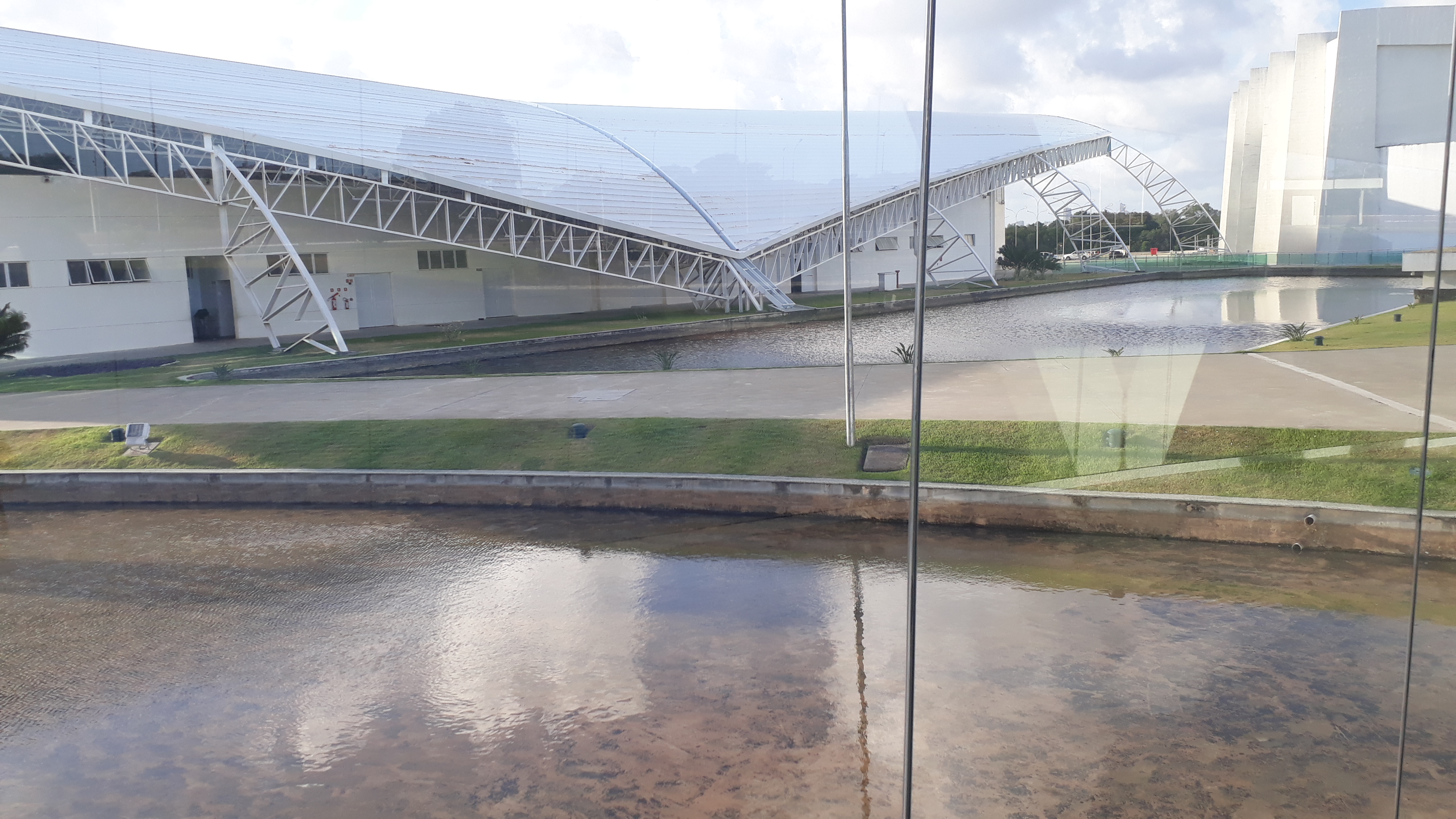
Facade of the Fair and Exhibition Pavilion

It has the capacity to hold up to 4 simultaneous events, with capacity to house 20,000 people. The building was oriented longitudinally, from north to south, to allow a greater shading of the facades and natural ventilation. In addition, there is a technical area, designed with the most modern technology, with a mechanical exhaust system, in which all installations can be made and distributed to provide the booths with points of water, sewage, electricity and structured cabling.

- Pavilhão de Congressos e Convenções (English: Congress and Convention Hall):

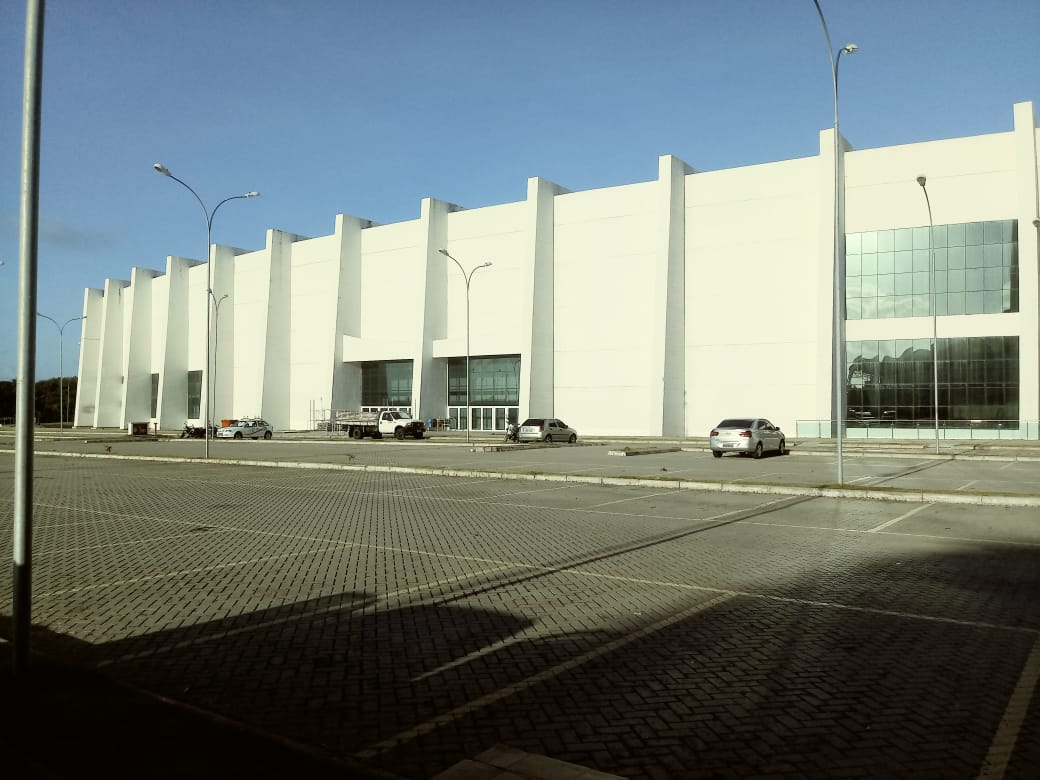
Facade of the Congress and Convention Hall

This structure has the capacity to house up to 9 thousand people, was inserted inside an artificial lake with depth of 60 cm and is interconnected to the block of the Mirante Tower through covered walkway. Its plant is formed by 4 arcs of circumference, forming a sophisticated and busy construction.

== Sustainability ==
The structure of the João Pessoa Convention Center is in line with the PCA (Environmental Control Plan). Surrounding the whole area of the development, there is an ecological corridor with 100 meters wide, with all the existing vegetation preserved. In addition, João Pessoa is in the most eastern point of the Americas and, for this reason, it was projected in front of the belvedere, a square with a sundial

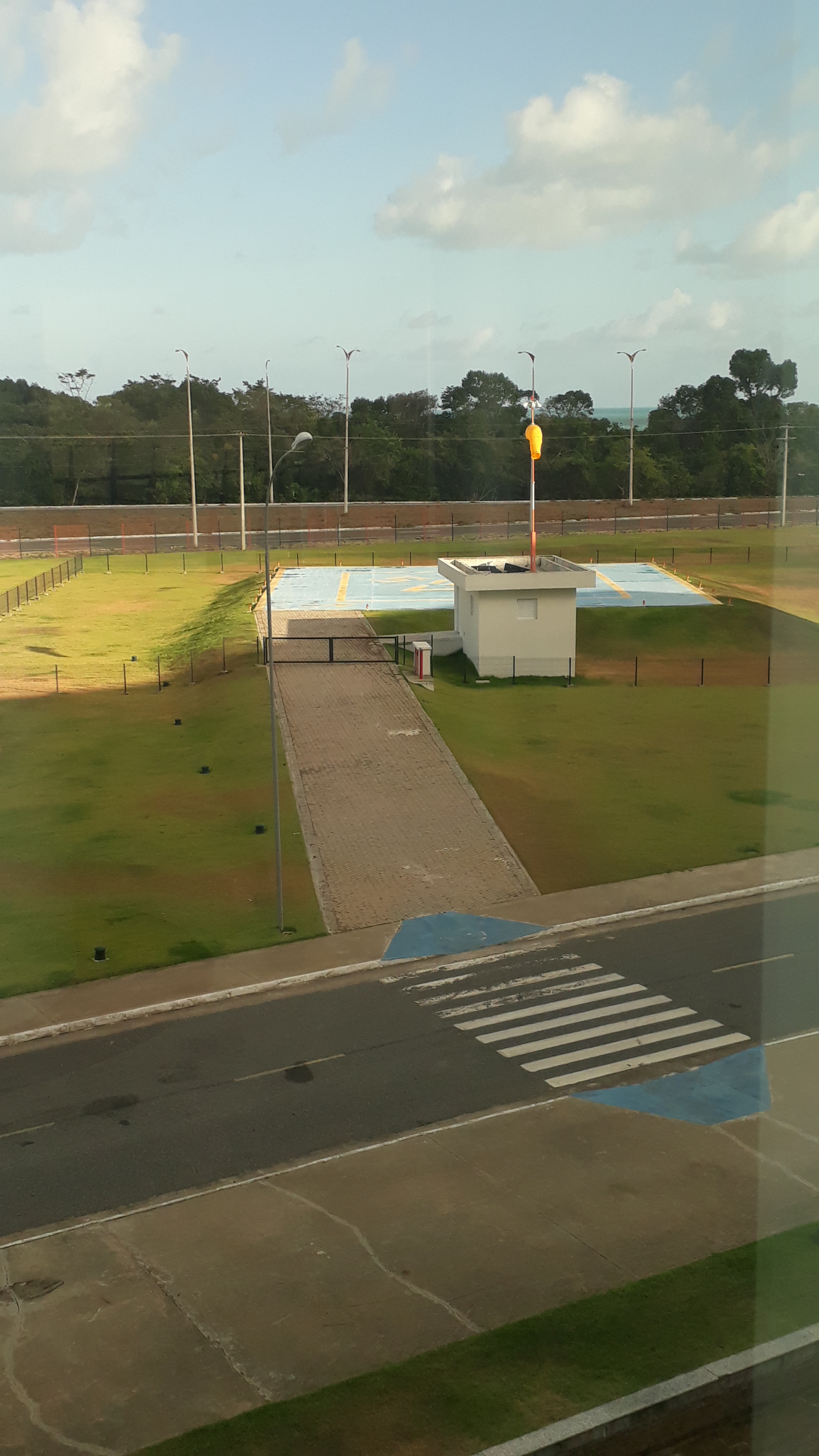
Airstrip of the João Pessoa Convention Center

== Accessibility ==
The whole structure of the Convention Center Poeta Ronaldo Cunha Lima in João Pessoa, is adapted to the people with special needs. The locomotion was planned to attend the public that needs accessibility, possessing: access ramps and elevators, providing support to the pavements of all the buildings of the Convention Center of João Pessoa. if necessary, wheelchairs will be available to on-site visitors.

== Prizes ==
The João Pessoa Convention Center provided Paraíba and its complex of events, to receive, in the year 2017, in São Paulo the national award Bronze Jacaré , as one of the best destinations for the holding of Congresses and Events, at the 17th edition of the Caio 2017 Award.

The main objective of the award is to encourage, recognize and value the work of professionals, event organizers, service providers, hotels, resorts, convention centers, congress venues and destinations for sustainable tourism performance in the Country.
