= Palais des congrès de Gatineau =

Coordinates: 45.42708°N 75.71291°W

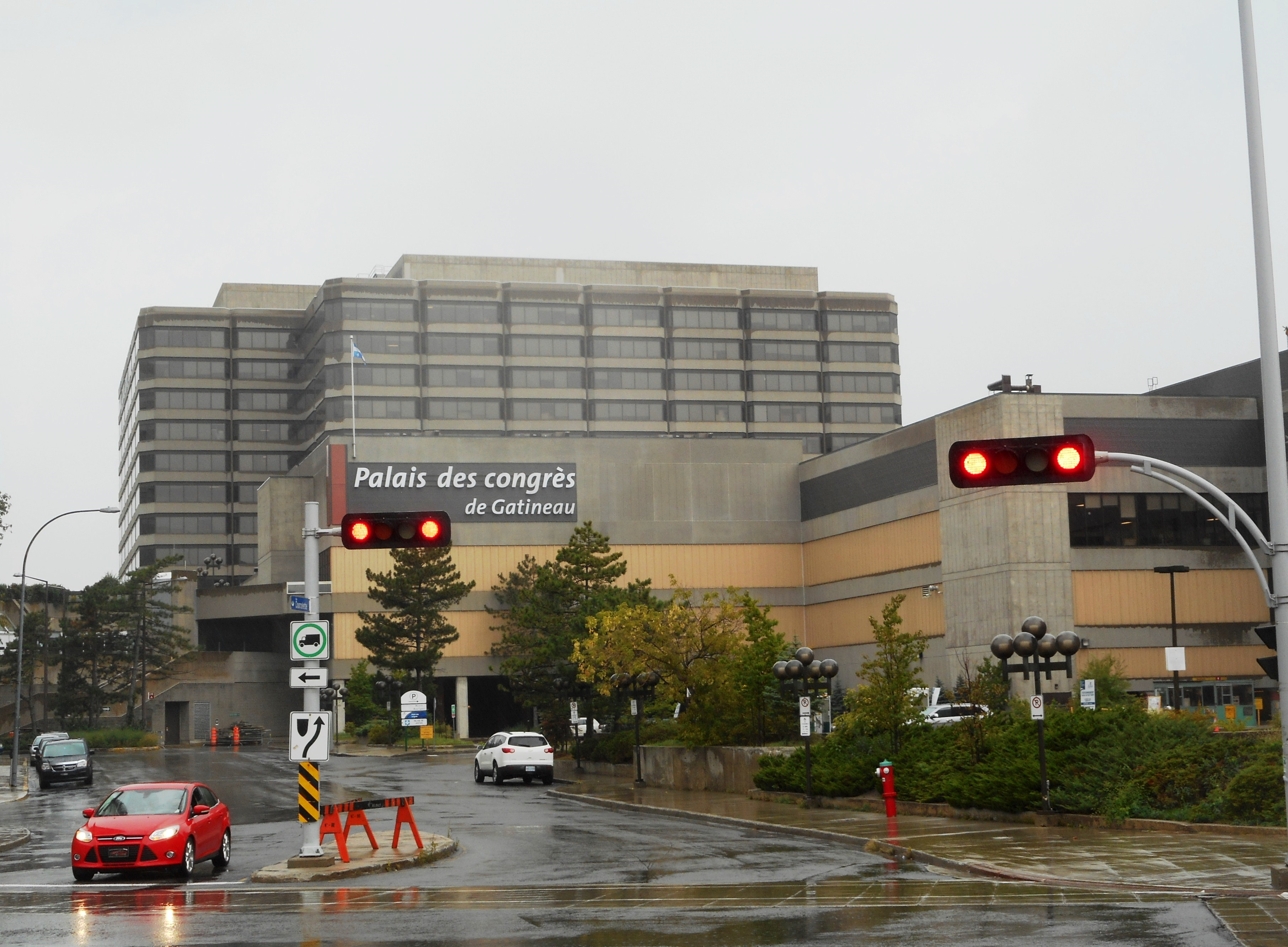
Palais des congrès de Gatineau

The Palais des congrès de Gatineau is a conference centre in Gatineau, Quebec, Canada. It was opened in 1981 beside the Gatineau City Hall near Place du Portage, home to a large number of Government of Canada offices. It was privately owned but leased on a long-term basis to, and managed by, the City of Gatineau. It lost money every year since opening until 2007 when the city broke the lease and management of the centre was taken over by the Government of Quebec.

It was announced in June 2009 that the centre would receive up to CAD$15,000,000 for renovations, a joint investment by the federal and provincial governments as was part of the federal government's infrastructure investment program to stimulate the economy after the market down-turn of 2008. The renovations were successfully completed by January 2011 at a cost of approximately CAD$15,300,000. The building now features 16 columnless meeting rooms, up-to-date technical services and on-site catering.

It was the site of the 1995 Progressive Conservative leadership convention.
