= Francisca Motta =

Brazilian historian and politician

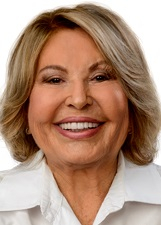
- Francisca Motta in 2022

State Deputy of Paraíba
- Incumbent
- Assumed office 1 February 2023
- Constituency: 20.ª

State Deputy of Paraíba
- In office 1 February 1995 – 31 December 2012
- Constituency: At-large

Mayor of Patos
- In office 1 January 2013 – 9 September 2016
- Preceded by: Nabor Wanderley da Nóbrega Filho
- Succeeded by: Lenildo Morais (interim)

Deputy Mayor of Patos
- In office 1 January 1993 – 31 January 1995
- Preceded by: Geraldo da Costa Palmeira
- Succeeded by: Maria Elizabeth Vieira Satyro

Personal details
- Born: 18 May 1940 (age 86) Catolé do Rocha, Paraíba, Brazil
- Party: Republicans (2018–present)
- Other political affiliations: Brazilian Democratic Movement (1992–2018)
- Spouse: Edivaldo Motta (1958–1992)
- Parent(s): Francisco Clementino de Araújo and Vitalina Maria da Conceição
- Profession: Historian; Pedagogue
- Website: franciscamotta.com.br

Francisca Gomes Araújo Motta (May 18, 1940) is a Brazilian historian, pedagogue and politician, affiliated with the Republicans. During her political career, she has served as deputy mayor and mayor of Patos, as well as state deputy of Paraíba for five terms.

== Biography ==
=== First years and education ===
The daughter of Francisco Clementino de Araújo and Vitalina Maria da Conceição, Francisca was born in the town of Catolé da Rocha, in the hinterland of Paraíba, in 1940.

At the age of 10, she moved to Patos, also in Paraíba. At 17, she married Edivaldo Motta and became a housewife. From his marriage, he had only one daughter, Ilana Motta, born in 1970. Later, he returned to his studies through supplementary schools and then entered the Federal University of Paraíba (UFPB), where he completed his academic activities, graduating in History and Pedagogy. She became a widow in 1992, after Edivaldo's death.

=== Politics ===
After the death of her husband Edivaldo, then Federal Deputy for Paraíba, at the age of fifty-two, she made her political debut in 1992. Affiliated to the Brazilian Democratic Movement Party (PMDB), she was a candidate for deputy mayor of Patos, on a ticket headed by the physician Ivânio Ramalho. They were elected after receiving 14,959 votes.

She resigned as deputy mayor to run for state deputy of Paraíba in the 1994 elections. She was elected after receiving 16,800 votes.

In 1996, she stepped down as a state representative to run for mayor of Patos, but was unsuccessful, coming second with 13,085 votes (35.61% of the valid votes), and was defeated by Dinaldo Wanderley (PFL), who was elected with 19,577 votes (53.27% of the valid votes). After her only electoral defeat, was once again elected in 1998 to be a state deputy.

In 2002 state election, she was elected for her third term. She was elected after receiving 24,163 votes. In 2006, she was elected to her fourth term as a state representative in the Legislative Assembly of Paraíba (ALPB). In 2010, she was elected for a fifth term after receiving 43,475 votes, making her the third most voted candidate and the most voted woman in the election.

In 2012, she was chosen by the PMDB of Patos to run for mayor, repeating the 1992 slate with Ivânio Ramalho, but this time with Francisca at the head of the slate. During the election, former president Luiz Inácio Lula da Silva recorded an election video in support of Francisca, whom the politician admires. Once again, the pair were victorious after receiving 53% of the votes and defeating Dinaldinho (DEM). With her victory, she became the second woman to govern the city, since between 1989 and 1993, twenty years earlier, Geralda Medeiros was the city's mayor. She was removed from office after allegations of corruption. Francisca was even arrested and her deputy, Lenildo Morais (PT), took over the city. Five days later, she was released by the authorities.

After more than 20 years in the MDB, he left the party to join the Republicans in 2018. She was elected for a fifth term in 2022 after receiving more than 40,000 votes. Together with João Gonçalves (PSB), she is the sixth-term member of parliament. In 2026, at the age of 86, she chose not to run for a seventh term in the Legislative Assembly of Paraíba. She decided to support her granddaughter, Olívia Motta, who received the highest number of votes ever for a female candidate running for a seat in the Legislative Assembly of Paraíba.

==== Electoral performance ====
| Year | Position | Party | Votes | Result | Ref. |
|---|---|---|---|---|---|
| 1992 | Deputy mayor of Patos | PMDB | 14,599 | Elected | |
| 1994 | State deputy | PMDB | 16,800 | Elected | |
| 1996 | Mayor of Patos | PMDB | 13,085 | Not elected | |
| 1998 | State deputy | PMDB | 29,022 | Elected | |
| 2002 | State deputy | PMDB | 24,603 | Elected | |
| 2006 | State deputy | PMDB | 36,323 | Elected | |
| 2010 | State deputy | PMDB | 43,475 | Elected | |
| 2012 | Mayor of Patos | PMDB | 28,407 | Elected | |
| 2022 | State deputy | Republicans | 40,230 | Elected | |

== Personal life ==
The Motta family has a political history in the city, starting with her late husband Edivaldo Motta who was a councillor, state and federal representative, her brother-in-law Edmilson Mota (now deceased) who was mayor of Patos between 1977 and 1983, her former son-in-law Nabor Wanderley who was also mayor between 2005 and 2013 and is currently a state representative, as well as her grandson Hugo Motta, who is the current president of the Chamber of Deputies. Lula offered Francisca a coffee after Hugo's election. Francisca is Catholic.

== Controversies ==
Administrative improbity

Francisca was convicted of administrative improbity, with the loss of her political rights for four years, as well as a fine of 100,000 reais. The decision was made by the judge of the County of Conceição, Antônio Eugênio. According to the lawsuit, filed by the Patos Public Assets Prosecutor's Office, she signed contract 25/2013, which refers to the provision of accounting advisory and consultancy services to the municipality of Patos, for a monthly amount of 10,000.00 reais, for twelve months, plus an additional 10,000 reais for the preparation of the annual accounts, totaling 130,000.00 reais, throughout 2013, with a waiver of bidding.

=== Prohibited conduct ===
She was also ordered to pay a fine of 25,000.00 reais, for the practice of prohibited conduct, consisting of the institutional promotion of her government on social networks, in violation of Law 9.504/97. The electoral representation was presented by the Christian Labor Party (PTC) claiming that in July 2016, she used social networks to publicize government actions. The decision was made by electoral judge Joscileide Ferreira de Lima.

| Preceded by Nabor Wanderley da Nóbrega Filho | Mayor of Patos; 2013–2016 | Succeeded by Dinaldinho |
