= João Azevêdo (Brazilian politician) =

Brazilian politician

- Azevêdo in 2023

Senator-elect for Paraíba
- Assuming office 1 February 2027

Governor of Paraíba
- In office 1 January 2019 – 2 April 2026
- Vice Governor: Lígia Feliciano (2019–2022); Lucas Ribeiro (2023–2026)
- Preceded by: Ricardo Coutinho
- Succeeded by: Lucas Ribeiro

Personal details
- Born: João Azevêdo Lins Filho; 14 August 1953 (age 73) João Pessoa, Paraíba, Brazil
- Party: PSB (2011–2019; 2022–present)
- Other political affiliations: Cidadania (2020–2022)
- Education: Federal University of Paraíba
- Profession: Civil engineer

João Azevêdo Lins Filho (born 14 August 1953) is a Brazilian civil engineer and politician who is currently the governor of the state of Paraíba. He was elected in 2018, and reelected in 2022. He is a member of the Brazilian Socialist Party (PSB).

== Biography ==
Azevêdo was born in João Pessoa in 1953, the son of João Azevêdo Lins and Odília Pereira Lins. A retired teacher from the Federal Institute of Education, Science and Technology of Paraíba (IFPB), Azevêdo graduated with a degree in civil engineering from the Federal University of Paraíba (UFPB) in 1978 and did post-graduate work in Technical School Methodology. He is married to Maria Sales Lins and has children and grandchildren.

Between 1980 and 1983, he acted as directed of the Housing Planning division of the Institute of Attendants' Health (IPEP); from 1983 to 1984, he became part of the leadership of the Economic Planning Consultancy of URBAN; from 1984 to 1985, he managed the infrastructure division of the Mid-size City Program, becoming the general coordinator of the program a little while afterwards. From 1986 to 1989 as well, he became the Secretary of Urban Services of the city of João Pessoa; In 2004, he was the Secretary of Planning of the city of Bayeux and, in 2005, he was the chief of the cabinet for the Secretary of Urban Development (SEDURB), assessor of the Secretary of Planning (SEPLAN) and adjunct secretary of the Housing Secretariat of João Pessoa. Along with these positions, between 2007 and 2010, Azevêdo was also the secretary of Infrastructure in the same municipality.

In 2011, Azevêdo was nominated by the then governor of Paraíba, Ricardo Coutinho, to be the State Secretary of the Environment, Water Resources and Science and Technology. Later in 2015, when there was a merging of this administrative post with the Secretary of Infrastructure, he went on to assume the position of Secretary of Infrastructure, Water Resources, the Environment, and Science and Technology (SEIRHMACT), remaining in the position until 5 April 2018.

== Governor of Paraíba ==
In April 2018, Azevêdo left SEIRHMACT to run for governor of Paraíba, having his candidacy confirmed by the PSB state convention in August. In the general elections that year in October, he was elected governor in the first round with the support of Coutinho, receiving 1,119,758 votes, or 58.18% of valid votes. He beat out older political leaders in Paraíba, namely José Maranhão, who was the candidate of the incumbent government, and Cássio Cunha Lima, who gave his support to Lucélio Cartaxo of the Green Party (PV).

In December 2019, Azevêdo announced he had left the PSB through a letter released to the press. The governor alleged that the dissolution of the state party and federal party intervention later on created a bothersome situation that required his leaving, complaining of the lack of democratic measures in the party. The intervention occurred after a series of denouncements and criticisms by members of the party connected to Coutinho, that brought a falling out with an ally of Azevêdo in the state party command, which came to be controlled by Coutinho. In response, the PSB apologized for making Azevêdo their gubernatorial candidate and asserted that his departure was a traitorous act that did not surprise them, because, as they alleged, he transformed his reelection goals into an obsession.

Azevêdo would later announce his new affiliation to Cidadania. The announcement occurred on the same day that 20 mayors throughout the state left the PSB, following the governor to Cidadania.

== Controversies ==
=== Abuse of ad campaigns ===
Since a complaint made by the "A Força da Esperança" coalition, led by Cartaxo in 2018, the Regional Elections' Court of Paraíba condemned Azevêdo, vice-governor Lígia Feliciano, and Coutinho for excessive and abuse use of institutional campaign features during the 2018 elections, from which they would have benefitted electorally. Each of them were sentenced to pay a fine of 5,320.50 reais. The defense appealed the sentence.

=== Operação Calvário ===
Azevêdo is being investigated by the Superior Court of Justice, suspected of crimes being concurrently investigated by Operação Calvário, which had been led by Coutinho. With his case, Coutinho himself had been arrested, but was released from prison due to an injunction. Following a denunciation by an ex-state secretary, it was alleged that there had been bribes paid to the Brazilian Red Cross to cover expenses since April 2018, during which time he ran for state government. The passing on of these bribes would have been extended until July, totaling around 480,000 reais. Azevêdo asserts he never received funds from those who wanted to have them for personal use and that his campaign was funded from party resources.

== Electoral history ==
Year	Election	Position	Party	Coalition	Vice	Votes	%	Result
2018	Paraíba state Elections	Governor	PSB	A Força do Trabalho (PSB, PDT, PT, DEM, PR, PTB, PRP, PODE, PRB, PCdoB, AVANTE, PPS, REDE, PMN, PROS)	Lígia Feliciano (PDT)	1,119,758	58.18%	Elected
2022	Paraíba state Elections	Governor	PSB	Juntos Pela Paraíba (PSB, PP, AGIR, AVANTE, PMN, PSD, SOLIDARIEDADE, PODE, REPUBLICANOS, PATRIOTA)	Lucas Ribeiro (PP)	1,221,904	52.51%	Elected

Political offices
Preceded by Ricardo Coutinho	Governor of Paraíba; 2019–2026	Succeeded by Lucas Ribeiro
