= 2014 Paraíba gubernatorial election =

- October 5, 2014
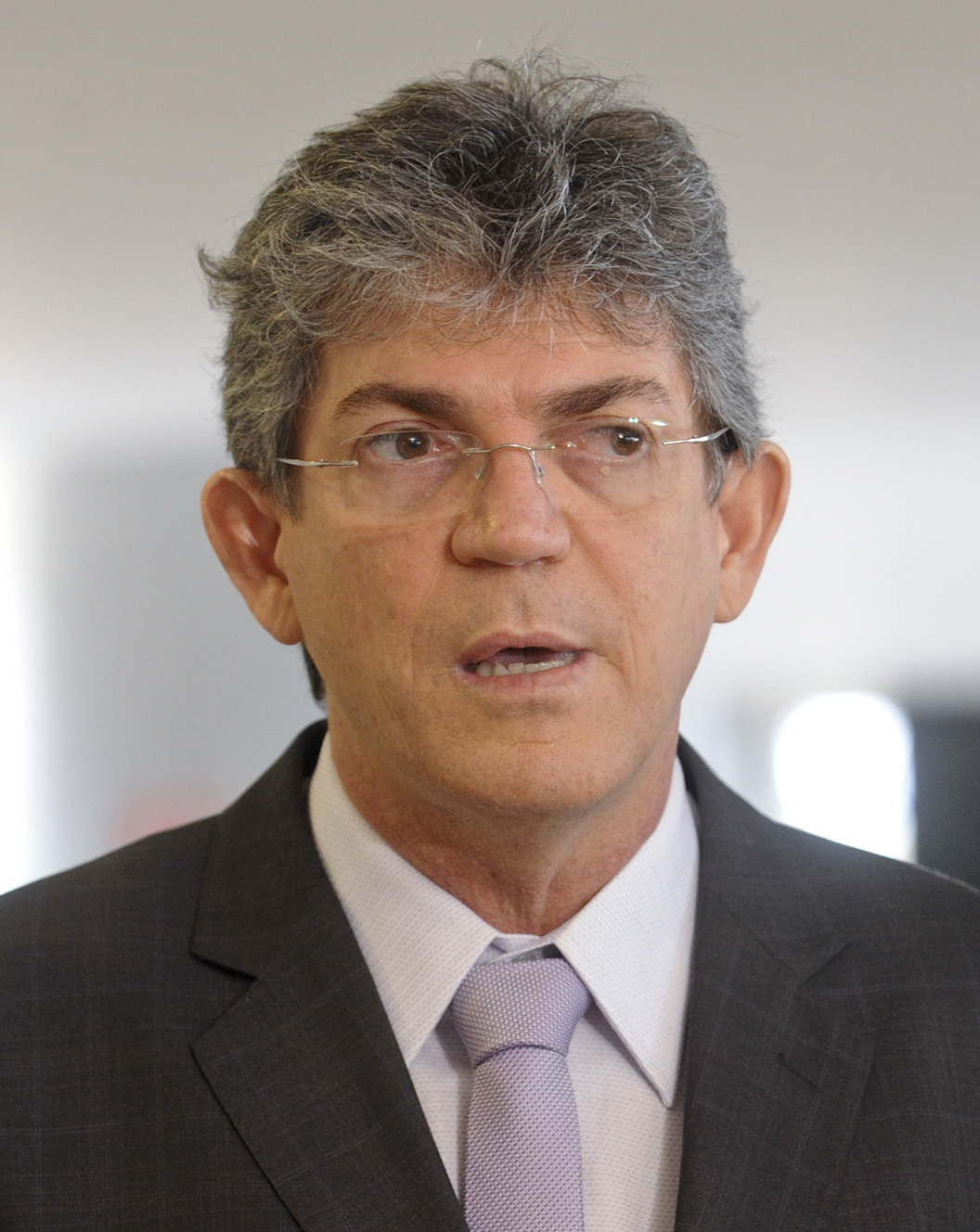

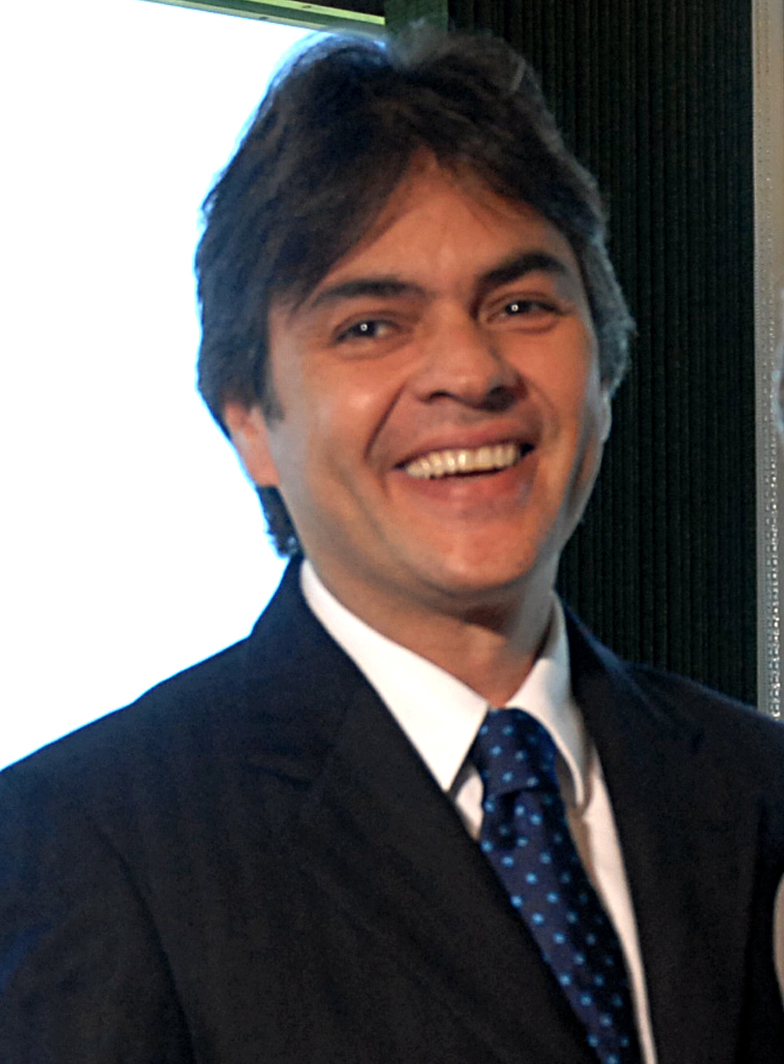

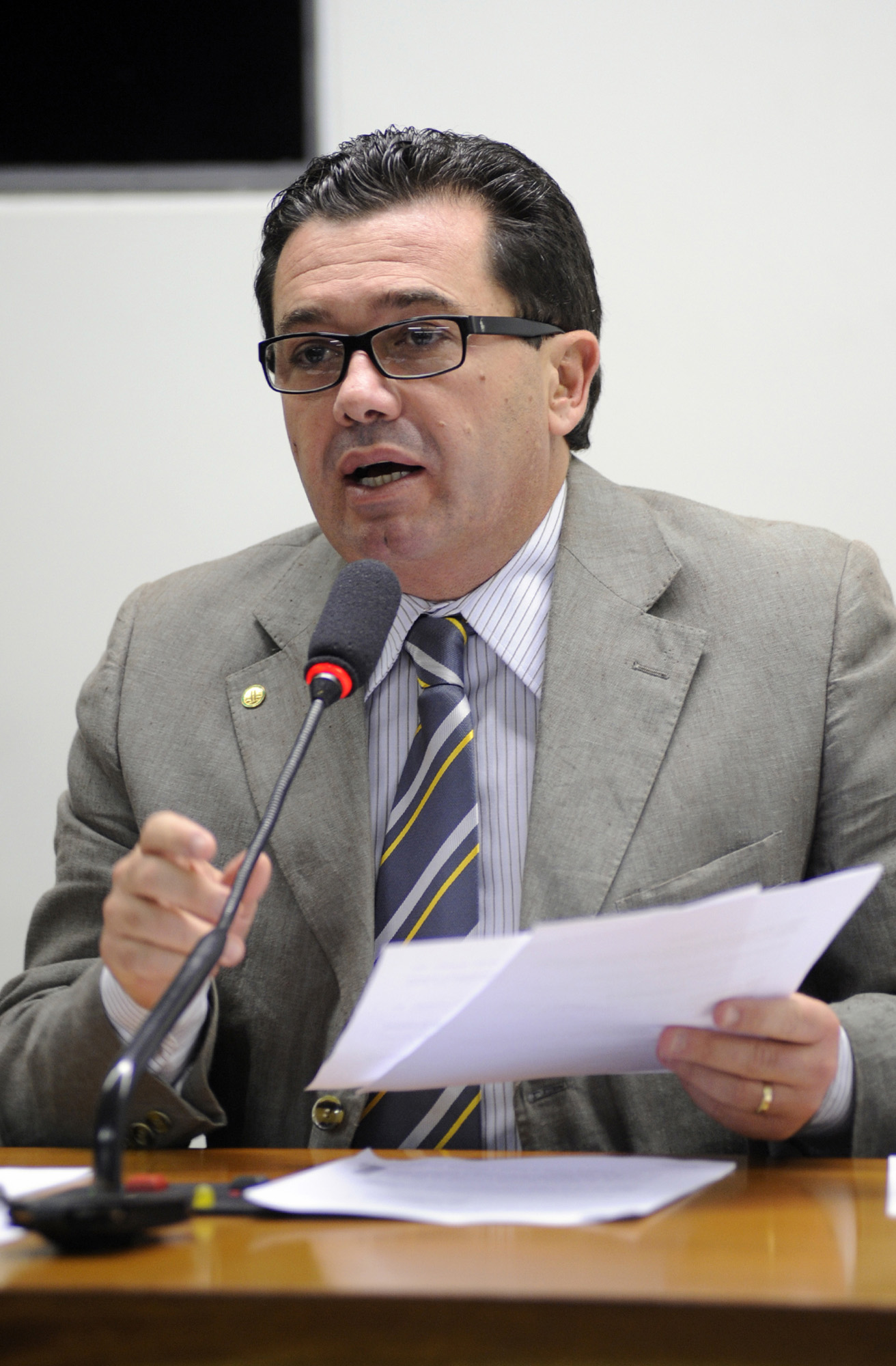
Nominee	Ricardo Coutinho (inc.)	Cássio Cunha Lima	Vital do Rêgo Filho
Party	PSB	PSDB	MDB
Running mate	Lígia Feliciano	Ruy Carneiro	Roberto Paulino
Governor before election
Ricardo Coutinho
PSB
Elected Governor
TBD

The Paraíba gubernatorial election was held on 5 October 2014 to elect the next governor of the state of Paraíba, Brazil. Governor Ricardo Coutinho of the Brazilian Socialist Party ran for reelection and won.

== Candidates ==
Candidate	Running mate	Coalition
Vital do Rêgo Filho; PMDB	Roberto Paulino; PMDB	"Real Renewal" (PMDB)
Antônio Radical; PSTU	Lena Leite; PSTU	-
Ricardo Coutinho; PSB	Lígia Feliciano; PDT	"The Work Force" (PSB, PDT, PT, DEM, PRTB, PRP, PV, PSL, PCdoB, PHS, PPL)
Cássio Cunha Lima; PSDB	Ruy Carneiro; PSDB	"The People's Will" (PSDB, PEN, PR, PTB, PSD, SD, PMN, PPS, PTdoB, PTN, PRB, PSDC, PSC, PP)
Tárcio Teixeira; PSOL	Marcos Dias; PSOL	-
Major Fábio; PROS	Olavo Filho; PROS	-

== Opinion Polling ==
Date	Institute	Candidate						Blank/Null/Undecided
Date	Institute	Ricardo Coutinho (PSB)	Cássio Cunha Lima (PSDB)	Vital do Rêgo Filho (PMDB)	Major Fábio (PROS)	Tárcio Teixeira (PSOL)	Antônio Radical (PSTU)	Blank/Null/Undecided
August 28–31, 2014	Ibope	33%	47%	4%	1%	-	-	14%
August 7–9, 2014	Ipespe	25%	48%	3%	1%	-	-	22%
