= Agassiz Almeida =

Brazilian politician (1935–2024)

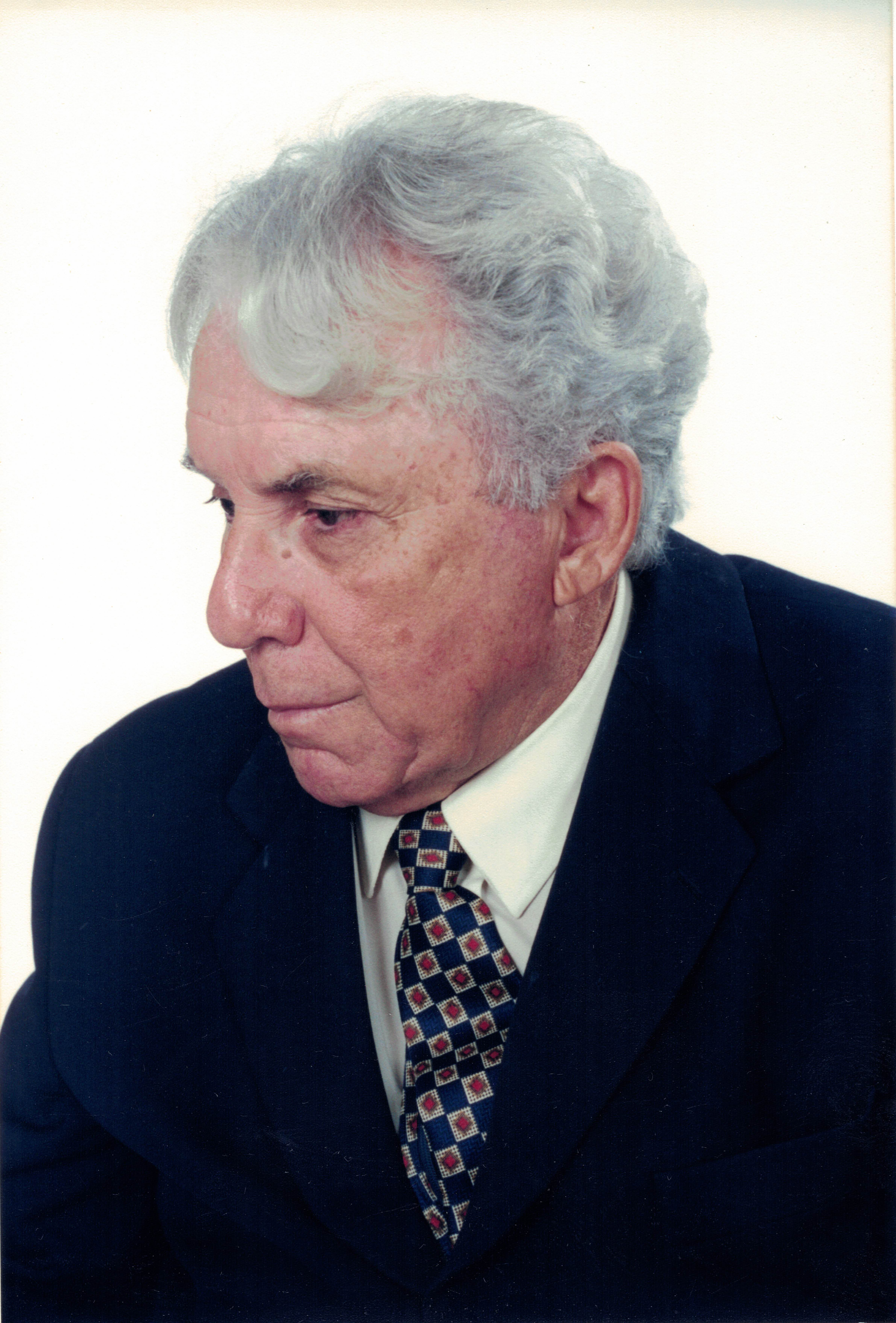

Member of the Chamber of Deputies
- In office 1 February 1987 – 1991

Personal details
- Born: Agassiz de Amorim e Almeida; 25 September 1935 Campina Grande, Paraíba, Brazil
- Died: 21 April 2024 (aged 88) João Pessoa, Paraíba, Brazil
- Party: Brazilian Democratic Movement Party
- Parent: Antônio Pereira de Almeida
- Education: Federal University of Paraíba

Agassiz de Amorim e Almeida (25 September 1935 – 21 April 2024) was a Brazilian writer, academic, politician and human rights activist. A notable opponent of the Military dictatorship in Brazil, which ruled the country from 1964 until the 1985 transition to democracy, Almeida co-founded the original MDB in 1966 alongside Ulysses Guimarães, Mário Covas, and Humberto Lucena.

Following the restoration of civilian rule, Almeida served as a member of the Chamber of Deputies representing Paraíba for the Brazilian Democratic Movement Party (PMDB) from 1987 to 1991.

== Biography ==
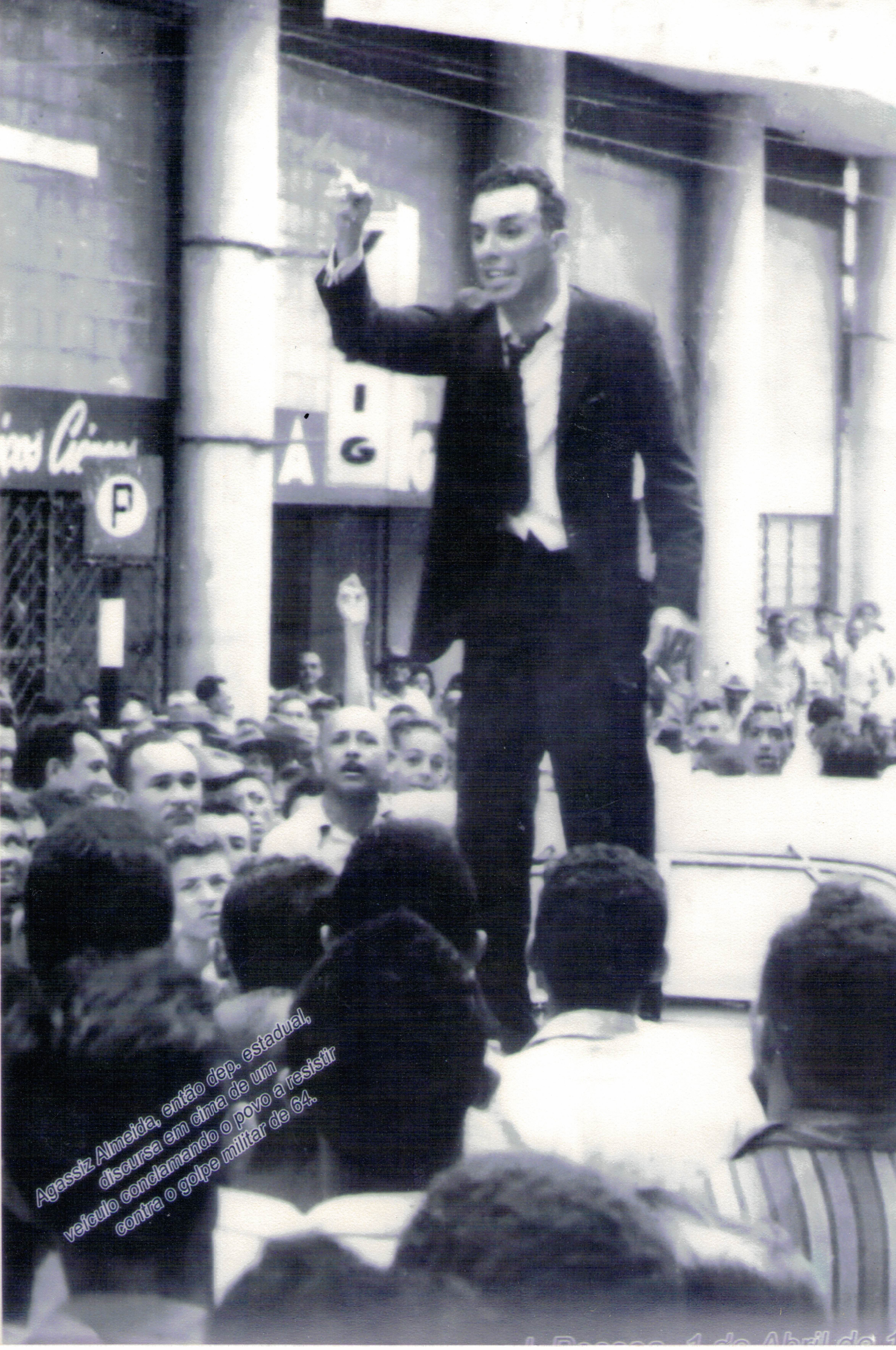
Almeida publicly condemning the Brazilian coup d'état in João Pessoa in April 1964.

Almeida was born in Campina Grande, Paraíba, on 25 September 1935. His father, Antônio Pereira de Almeida, served as the 7th Mayor of Campina Grande from 1932 to 1934 and a Paraíba state deputy. He graduated with a law degree from the Federal University of Paraíba in 1958. He soon co-founded the Peasant Leagues in Paraíba, for which he also served as a lawyer. He also became a professor at the Faculty of Economic Sciences at the Federal University of Paraíba.

Almeida was elected to the Legislative Assembly of Paraíba as a member of the Brazilian Socialist Party (PSB), where he served for several months until the 1964 Brazilian coup d'état. He was a proponent of agrarian reform, among other issues. Following the 1964 military coup, Almeida and three other PSB colleagues in the Legislative Assembly - Assis Lemos, Langstein de Almeida and Figueiredo Agra - were impeached and removed from office on 7 April 1964, becoming some of the first opponents of the new military regime to be purged from their positions in Paraíba state.

On 11 April 1964, Almeida and eight other professors at the Federal University of Paraíba were further fired for alleged "subversive" behavior. Their dismissal was confirmed by the UFPB University Council on 11 May 1964. Almeida was arrested and sent to a prison for political prisoners on the island of Fernando de Noronha.

In 1966, he joined with several politicians and colleagues to establish the Brazilian Democratic Movement (MDB).

Alemida participated in the 1984 Diretas Já protests in Campina Grande and João Pessoa, which called for direct presidential elections.

He was elected to the Chamber of Deputies from Paraíba in the 1986 Brazilian parliamentary election on 15 November 1986. The national assembly took office on 1 February 1987, and helped draft the new federal Constitution of Brazil in 1988.

Agassiz Almeida died at his home in João Pessoa, Paraíba, on 21 April 2024, at the age of 88. His funeral viewing was held at the Legislative Assembly of Paraíba building on 22 April 2024, with burial at the Parque das Acácias cemetery.
