= Lígia Feliciano =

Brazilian doctor, businesswoman and politician (born 1957)

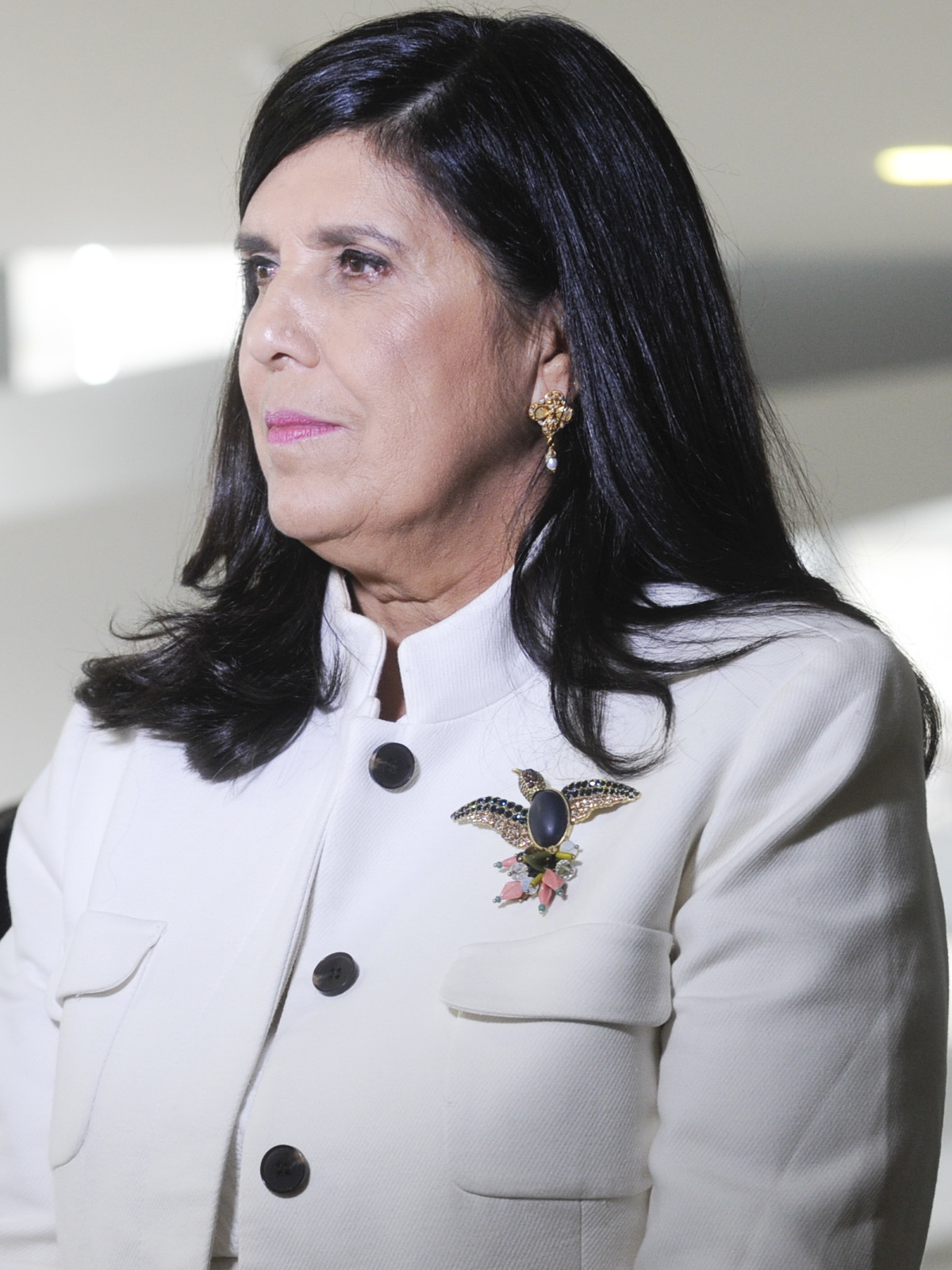

Vice Governor-elect of Paraíba
- Assuming office 6 January 2027
- Governor: Lucas Ribeiro
- Succeeding: Lucas Ribeiro
- In office 1 January 2015 – 1 January 2023
- Governor: Ricardo Coutinho; João Azevêdo
- Preceded by: Rômulo Gouveia
- Succeeded by: Lucas Ribeiro

Personal details
- Born: Ana Lígia Costa; 21 April 1957 (age 69) Campina Grande, Paraíba, Brazil
- Party: UNIÃO (2023–present)
- Other political affiliations: PSC (2001–2005); PRTB (2005–2007); PDT (2007–2023)
- Spouse: Damião Feliciano (m. 1978)
- Children: 3, including Gustavo
- Education: Federal University of Campina Grande
- Profession: Doctor, businesswoman

Ana Lígia Costa Feliciano (née Costa, born 21 April 1957) is a Brazilian doctor, businesswoman, and politician who served as the vice-governor of Paraíba from 2015 to 2023. She served as vice-governor under governors Ricardo Coutinho and João Azevêdo. She is currently affiliated with the Democratic Labour Party (PDT). Her husband is fellow doctor, businessman, radio personality, and federal deputy Damião Feliciano.

== Biography ==
Feliciano is the daughter of José Amaro da Costa and Maria do Carmo Costa, both merchants. She attended an all-girls' school, and later graduated with a degree in medicine from the former Campina Grande campus of the Federal University of Paraíba, now the Federal University of Campina Grande. She is married to Damião Feliciano, with whom she has three children. She is the director-president of the Faculdades UNESC, of Rádio Panorâmica, and of two hospitals her family directs.

Feliciano was a candidate for the 2002 senatorial election for a vacant seat in Paraíba, but came in 5th place. She ran to be vice-mayor of the state capital João Pessoa, with Rômulo Gouveia from the PSDB, but came in second place. She was elected vice-governor of Paraíba in both 2014 and 2018.

Since a complaint made by the "A Força da Esperança" coalition, led by Lucélio Cartaxo in 2018, the Regional Elections' Court of Paraíba condemned governor João Azevêdo, vice-governor Lígia Feliciano, and Ricardo Coutinho for excessive and abusive use of institutional campaign features during the 2018 elections, from which they would have benefitted electorally. Each of them were sentenced to pay a fine of 5,320.50 reais. The defense appealed the sentence.

== Electoral history ==
Year	Election	Party	Office	Coalition	Partners	Party	Votes	Percent	Result
2002	State Elections of Paraíba	PSC	Senator	Um Novo Caminho (PT, PL, PCdoB, PMN, PSC)	Marconi Oliveira	PSC	169,895	5.87%	Not elected
2002	State Elections of Paraíba	PSC	Senator	Um Novo Caminho (PT, PL, PCdoB, PMN, PSC)	Carlos Bezerra	PT	169,895	5.87%	Not elected
2008	Municipal Election of Campina Grande	PDT	Vice Mayor	Por Amor a Campina (PSDB, PP, DEM, PTB, PRTB, PDT, PV, PTC, PR, PTN, PRP)	Rômulo Gouveia	PSDB	104,449	47.78%	Runoff
2008	Municipal Election of Campina Grande	PDT	Vice Mayor	Por Amor a Campina (PSDB, PP, DEM, PTB, PRTB, PDT, PV, PTC, PR, PTN, PRP)	Rômulo Gouveia	PSDB	109,343	48.48%	Not elected
2014	State Elections of Paraíba	PDT	Vice Governor	A Força do Trabalho (PSB, PDT, PT, DEM, PRTB, PRP, PV, PSL, PCdoB, PHS, PPL)	Ricardo Coutinho	PSB	937,009	46.05%	Runoff
2014	State Elections of Paraíba	PDT	Vice Governor	A Força do Trabalho (PSB, PDT, PT, DEM, PRTB, PRP, PV, PSL, PCdoB, PHS, PPL)	Ricardo Coutinho	PSB	1,125,956	52.61%	Elected
2018	State Elections of Paraíba	PDT	Vice Governor	A Força do Trabalho (PSB, PDT, PT, DEM, PR, PTB, PRP, PODE, PRB, PCdoB, PPS, Avante, REDE, PMN, PROS)	João Azevêdo	PSB	1,119,758	58.18%	Elected
2026	State Elections of Paraíba	UNIÃO	Vice Governor	Daqui pra Melhor (PP, UNIÃO, PODE, MOBILIZA, PT, PCdoB, PV, Agir, PRD, Solidariedade, Republicanos, PSB)	Lucas Ribeiro	PP	1,470,252	64.30%	Elected

Political offices
Preceded by Rômulo Gouveia	Vice Governor of Paraíba; 2015–2023	Succeeded by Lucas Ribeiro
Vacant Title last held by Lucas Ribeiro	Vice Governor of Paraíba; Taking office 2027	Elect
