= Daniella Ribeiro =

Brazilian politician

- Official portrait

Senator for Paraíba
- Incumbent
- Assumed office 1 February 2019

Senate Female Caucus Leader
- Incumbent
- Assumed office 30 March 2023
- Preceded by: Eliziane Gama

Senate PP Leader
- In office 2 February 2021 – 7 April 2022
- Preceded by: Ciro Nogueira
- Succeeded by: Mailza Gomes

Member of the Legislative Assembly of Paraíba
- In office 1 February 2011 – 1 February 2019
- Constituency: At-large

City Councillor of Campina Grande
- In office 1 January 2009 – 1 February 2011
- Constituency: At-large

Personal details
- Born: Daniella Velloso Borges Ribeiro; 26 March 1972 (age 54) Campina Grande, Paraíba, Brazil
- Party: PSD (2023–present)
- Other political affiliations: PP (1999–2023)
- Children: 3, including Lucas
- Profession: Pedagogue

Daniella Velloso Borges Ribeiro (born 26 March 1972) is a federal senator of Brazil representing her home state of Paraíba. She was previously served in the Legislative Assembly of Paraíba from 2011 to 2019 and was vereador of Campina Grande from 2009 to 2011.

== Personal life ==
Ribeiro was born to Enivaldo Ribeiro and Virgínia Velloso Borges. Her father Enivaldo is also a politician who served as mayor of Capina Grande from 1977 to 1983, while her brother Aguinaldo served as minister of cities from 2012 to 2014. She is divorced and has three children: Lucas, Marcella, and Gabriel. She has degrees from the Federal University of Paraíba and the University of Brasília.

== Political career ==
In the 2008 election Ribeiro was elected to the City Council of Campina Grande with 6,838 votes. Ribeiro was then elected to the Legislative Assembly of Paraíba in 2010 with 29,863 votes.

Along with Veneziano Vital do Rêgo, Ribeiro was elected to the Federal Senate in the 2018 Brazilian general election.

Federal Senate
| Preceded by Ciro Nogueira | Senate PP Leader; 2021–2022 | Succeeded by Mailza Gomes |
| Preceded by Eliziane Gama | Senate Female Caucus Leader; 2023–present | Incumbent |
