= Lúcia Braga =

Brazilian politician (1934–2020)

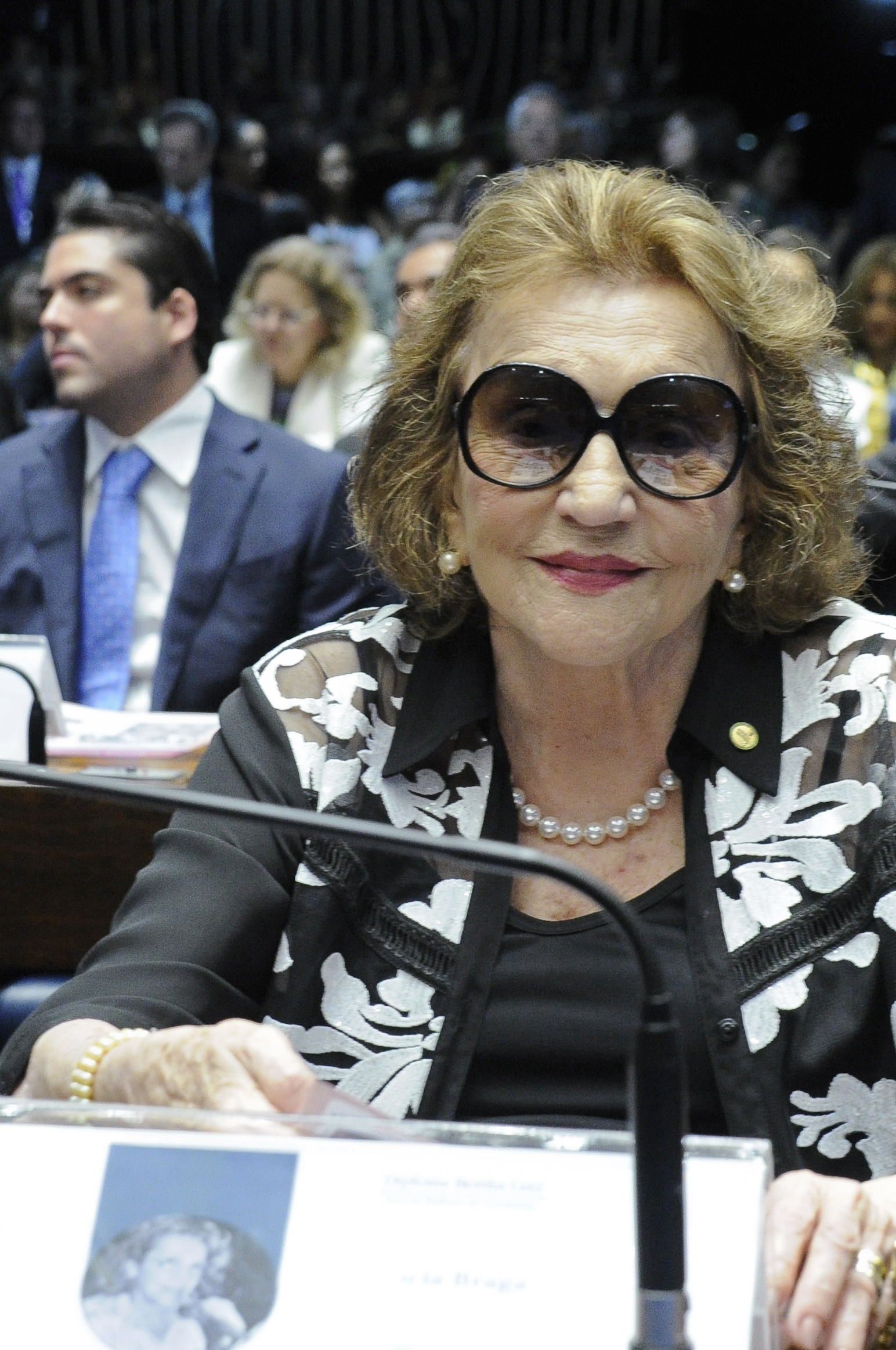

Member of the Chamber of Deputies from Paraíba
- In office 1987–1995
- In office 2003–2007

Member of the Legislative Assembly of Paraíba
- In office 1999–2003

First Lady of Paraíba
- In role 1983–1987
- Governor: Wilson Braga

Personal details
- Born: Ana Lúcia Navarro; December 13, 1934 João Pessoa, Paraíba, Brazil
- Died: May 8, 2020 (aged 85) João Pessoa, Paraíba, Brazil
- Party: Partido Social Democrático (PSD)
- Other political affiliations: PFL (former); PDT (former); PSB (former); PSL (former)
- Spouse: Wilson Braga
- Education: Federal University of Paraíba
- Profession: Politician, social worker

Ana Lúcia Navarro Braga (13 December 1934 – 8 May 2020), better known as simply Lúcia Braga, was a Brazilian politician, social worker and lawyer from the state of Paraíba.

== Life ==
Before pursuing a career in politics, Braga graduated in two majors, social work from 1955 to 1959 and law from 1969 to 1973.

In 1982, Braga's husband Wilson Braga was elected Governor of Paraíba. Therefore, Lúcia held the role of First Lady of Paraíba from 1983 to 1987.

In 1986, she was elected Member of the Chamber of Deputies representing her birth state of Paraíba. She remained in power from 1987 to 1995.

In 1994, she decided to run at the 1994 Paraíba state elections, aiming to become Paraíba's next Governor, but failed to win.

In 1998, she was elected Member of the Legislative Assembly of Paraíba and held the post from 1999 to 2003.

In 2002, Braga was again elected as a Member of the Chamber of Deputies for Paraíba. This time she remained in power from 2003 to 2007.

== Personal life ==
Braga, was married to Wilson Braga, a politician, who also held multiple political posts, such as Governor of Paraíba (1983–1987); Member of the Chamber of Deputies from Paraíba (1967–1982; 1995–2003 and 2007–2011); Mayor of João Pessoa (1989–1990) among others.

== Death ==
On May 8, 2020, Braga died at the age of 85 after being hospitalized in João Pessoa. Three days later, her family confirmed she was infected and killed by COVID-19 during the COVID-19 pandemic in Brazil after a positive test result was released post mortem.
