= Lucas Ribeiro =

Lucas Ribeiro may refer to:

- Lucas Ribeiro (footballer, born 1998), Brazilian footballer
- Lucas Ribeiro (footballer, born 1999), Brazilian footballer
- Lucas Ribeiro (footballer, born 2000), Uruguayan footballer
- Lucas Ribeiro (politician) (born 1989), Brazilian politician
