= List of mayors of João Pessoa, Paraíba =

The following is a list of mayors of the city of João Pessoa, in Paraíba state, Brazil.

- Jovino Limeira Dinoá, 1895-1900
- Francisco Xavier Júnior, 1904-1908
- Otacílio Albuquerque, 1908-1911
- José Bezerra Cavalcanti, 1912-1916
- Demócrito de Almeida, 1916
- Antônio Pessoa Filho, 1916-1917
- Diógenes Gonçalves Pena, 1918-1920
- Walfredo Guedes Pereira, 1920–1924, 1935
- Trajano Pires da Nóbrega, 1924-1926
- João Maurício de Medeiros, 1926-1928
- José D'Ávila Lins, 1928-1930
- Joaquim Pessoa Cavalcanti de Albuquerque, 1930-1931
- José de Borja Peregrino, 1931-1934
- Antônio Pereira Diniz, 1935-1936
- Osvaldo Trigueiro Mello, 1936-1938
- Fernando Nóbrega, 1938-1940
- Ernani Sátiro, 1940
- Francisco Cícero de Melo Filho, 1940-1945
- Osvaldo Pessoa Cavalcanti de Albuquerque, 1945, 1948-1951
- Luís de Oliveira Lima, 1945–1946, 1951-1955
- Manuel Ribeiro de Morais, 1946
- Abelardo de Araújo Jurema, 1946-1947
- José Targino, 1947
- Severino Alves da Silveira, 1947
- Apolônio Sales de Miranda, 1955-1959
- Luís Gonzaga de Miranda Freire, 1959-1963
- Domingos Mendonça Neto, 1963-1966
- Damásio Barbosa de Franca, 1966-1971
- Dorgival Terceiro Neto, 1971-1974
- Luís Alberto Moreira Coutinho, 1974
- Hermano Augusto de Almeida, 1975-1979
- Damásio Barbosa da Franca, 1979-1983
- Osvaldo Trigueiro, 1983-1985
- Antônio Carneiro Arnaud, 1986-1988
- Wilson Braga, 1989-1990
- Carlos Mangueira, 1990-1992
- Francisco Franca, 1993-1996
- Cícero Lucena, 1997-2004
- Ricardo Coutinho, 2005-2010
- Luciano Agra, 2010-2012
- Luciano Cartaxo, 2013-2021
- Cícero Lucena, 2021-2026
- Léo Bezerra, 2026-present

== See also ==
- List of João Pessoa municipal elections
- João Pessoa history (in Portuguese)
- History of Paraíba (state)
- List of mayors of largest cities in Brazil (in Portuguese)
- List of mayors of capitals of Brazil (in Portuguese)
