= Wilson Braga =

Brazilian politician (1931–2020)

Member of the Legislative Assembly of Paraíba
- In office 1955–1967
- In office 2011–2015

Member of the Chamber of Deputies from Paraíba
- In office 1967–1982
- In office 1995–2003
- In office 2007–2011

Governor of Paraíba
- In office 1983–1987
- Preceded by: Clóvis Bezerra Cavalcanti
- Succeeded by: Milton Bezerra Cabral

Mayor of João Pessoa
- In office 1989–1990
- Preceded by: Antônio Carneiro Arnaud
- Succeeded by: Carlos Mangueira

City councillor of João Pessoa
- In office 1993–1994

Personal details
- Born: Wilson Leite Braga; July 18, 1931 Conceição, Paraíba, Brazil
- Died: May 17, 2020 (aged 88) João Pessoa, Paraíba, Brazil
- Party: Brazilian Democratic Movement (PMDB)
- Other political affiliations: ARENA (former); PDS (former); PFL (former); PSDB (former); PSB (former); PDT (former); PSD (former)
- Spouse: Lúcia Braga
- Education: Federal University of Paraíba
- Profession: Politician, lawyer, businessman

Wilson Leite Braga (18 July 1931 – 17 May 2020), better known as simply Wilson Braga, was a Brazilian politician, lawyer and businessman from the state of Paraíba.

== Life ==
Before pursuing a career in politics, Braga graduated in law at Federal University of Paraíba.

In 1954, Braga was elected member of the Legislative Assembly of Paraíba and held the post from 1955 to 1967.

In 1966, he was elected member of the Chamber of Deputies representing his birth state of Paraíba. He remained in power from 1967 to 1982.

In 1982, he was elected governor of Paraíba, remaining from 1983 to 1987.

In 1988, he was elected mayor of João Pessoa. He kept the post from 1989 to 1990.

In 1992, he was elected city councillor of João Pessoa, retaining the post from 1993 to 1994.

In 1994, he was again elected member of the Chamber of Deputies from Paraíba. This time he remained in power from 1995 to 2003.

In 2006, he was elected member of the Chamber of Deputies from Paraíba for the third and last time, keeping the post from 2007 to 2011.

In 2010, he was again elected member of the Legislative Assembly of Paraíba and held the post from 2011 to 2015, retiring from politics afterwards.

== Personal life ==
Braga, was married to Lúcia Braga, a politician, who held two political posts: member of the Chamber of Deputies from Paraíba (1987–1995 and 2003–2007) and member of the Legislative Assembly of Paraíba (1999–2003). Braga's wife died from COVID-19 on May 8, 2020.

== Death ==
On 17 May 2020, Braga died in João Pessoa, from COVID-19 during the COVID-19 pandemic in Brazil at the age 88, only ten days after his wife Lúcia, who also succumbed to the same illness.
