= Damião Feliciano =

Brazilian politician (born 1952)

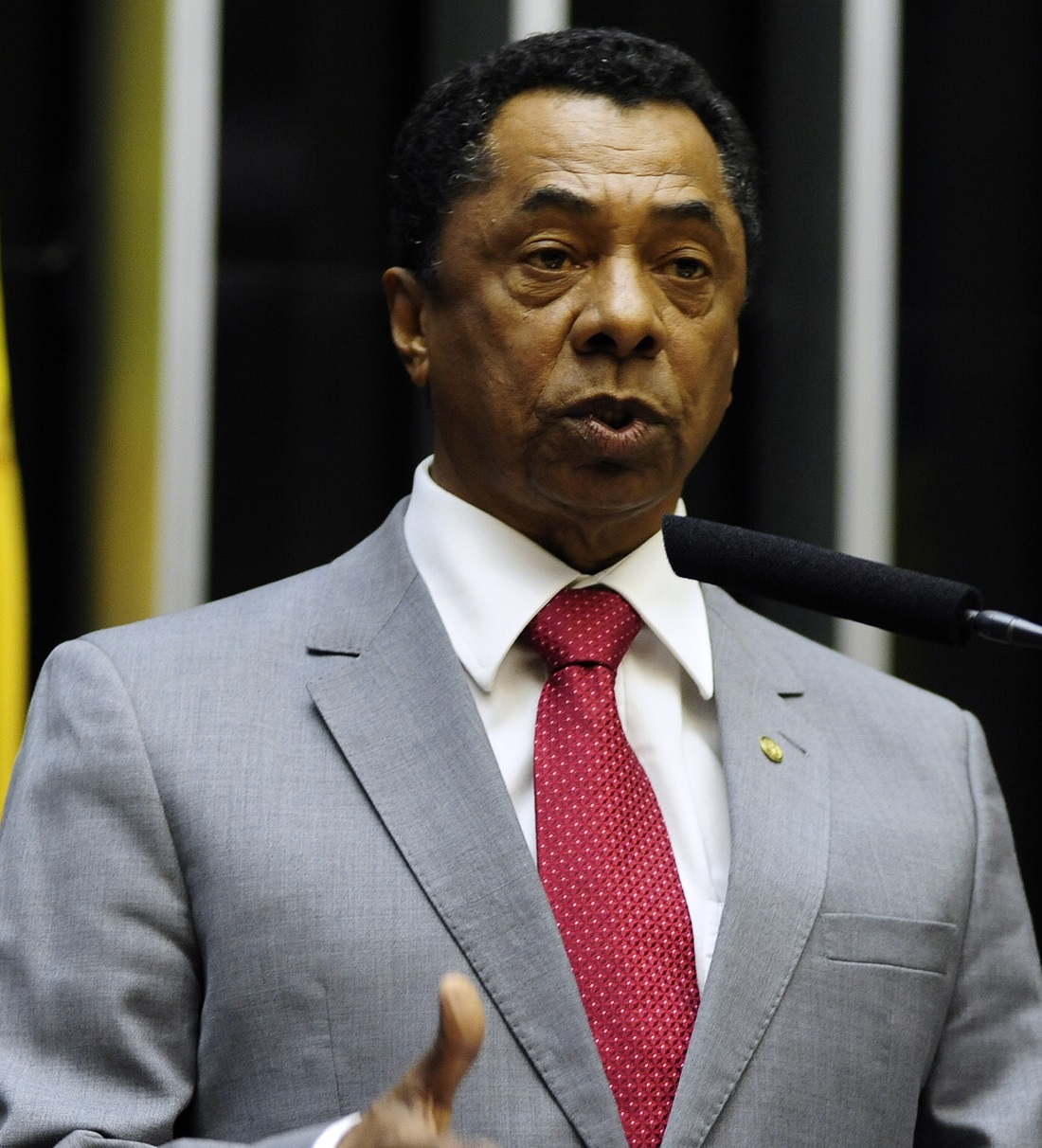
- Feliciano in 2015

Member of the Chamber of Deputies
- Incumbent
- Assumed office 1 February 2007
- Constituency: Paraíba
- In office 1 February 1999 – 23 November 2004
- Constituency: Paraíba

Personal details
- Born: Damião Feliciano da Silva; 28 April 1952 (age 74) Campina Grande, Paraíba, Brazil
- Party: UNIÃO (2022–present)
- Other political affiliations: PTB (1992–1999); PMDB (1999–2004); PP (2004–2005); PL (2005–2006); PR (2006–2007); PDT (2007–2022)
- Spouse: Ana Lígia Costa (m. 1978)
- Children: 3, including Gustavo
- Profession: Physician

Damião Feliciano da Silva (born 28 April 1952) is a Brazilian politician who has been a federal deputy from the state of Paraíba since 2007, having also previously been a federal deputy from 1999 to 2004. He is currently affiliated with the Brazil Union party (UNIÃO). He was the state secretary of Science, Technology, and the Environment from 2005 to 2006. His wife is former vice-governor of Paraíba and fellow doctor Lígia Feliciano.

== Biography ==
Born in Campina Grande, he graduated with his medical degree from the Campina Grande School of Medicine. He founded several hospitals in the area, namely Hospital Mariana and Hospital de Urgência, where he had acted as director general and administrative and financial director from 1982 to 1998. He was a founding partner of Panorâmica FM de Campina Grande and a personality on 100.5FM de Santa Rita, where he presents the A Voz do Coração program daily, which highlights different cities in Paraíba. From 2005 to 2006, he was state Secretary of Science, Technology, and the Environment as part of the administration of governor Cássio Cunha Lima.

Feliciano began his political career in 1992 as a candidate for mayor in Campina Grande, as part of the Brazilian Labour Party (PTB), but was not elected. He was first elected as a federal deputy in 1998, receiving 76,101 votes and becoming the second most voted for candidate in Paraíba. He lost reelection in 2002, but was elected as a substitute deputy. He assumed the position as a substitute deputy as part of the Brazilian Democratic Movement (MDB) in 2004 for five months. In 2006, as part of the Liberal Party (PL), he was reelected as deputy, and was reelected in 2010 as part of the Democratic Labour Party (PDT). He was the president of the state branch of the PDT. In the Chamber of Deputies, he has been a part of parliamentary groups, and is the president of the Parliamentary Front in Defense of Health Professionals. In 2023, he assumed the leadership of the recently created Black Bench of the Chamber of Deputies, made up of Black and racially mixed deputies of the chamber.

Feliciano voted against the impeachment of Dilma Rousseff. He later voted for a similar inquiry towards the impeachment of Michel Temer. In the same term, he voted in favor of the New Fiscal Regime, but did not vote on the 2017 labor reforms. On 24 November 2020, the creation of an external commission from the Chamber of Deputies was authorized to monitor the investigation into the murder of João Alberto Silveira Freitas in Porto Alegre. The commission is coordinated by Feliciano, and is also composed of five other deputies: Benedita da Silva, Bira do Pindaré, Silvia Cristina, Áurea Carolina and Orlando Silva.
