= João Alberto Freitas =

- Born: January 2, 1980; Humaitá, Rio Grande do Sul, Brazil
- Died: November 19, 2020 (aged 40); Porto Alegre, Brazil
- Cause of death: Asphyxiation due to beaten to death
- Resting place: Porto Alegre, Brazil
- Occupations: Freelance, workers
- Known for: Circumstances of his death
- Partners: Rita de Cássia do Amaral; Marilene Santos Manuel; Milena Borges Alves
- Children: 5

João Alberto Freitas (2 January 1980 – 19 November 2020), commonly known as João Beto, was a Brazilian who was killed by security guards and Carrefour staff in Porto Alegre, Rio Grande do Sul, Brazil. The guards and staff beat Freitas and knelt on his back until he lost consciousness. He died from mechanical asphyxiation. A large protest against racism towards Black people quickly spread across Brazil following his death, and the guards and staff involved were arrested on murder charges.

== Biography ==
Born at Humaitá, Rio Grande do Sul in 1980, João Alberto Freitas was the second son of João Batista Rodrigues Freitas, a driver. His mother, a factory worker, passed away in 2017. Freitas lived with his sister. In 1987, at the age of seven, he broke his femur, preventing him from attending school for six months. Despite this, he passed the year.

Freitas had a relationship with Rita de Cássia do Amaral and had a daughter at the age of 17. However, he never married or lived with Amaral. After the birth of his eldest daughter, Freitas took on various jobs, including a repairman, waiter, and gardener. He completed courses in heavy machinery and car mechanics, and worked in automotive workshops. He also worked for a company outsourced by the Post Office.

In 2002, while working at Salgado Filho Airport, Freitas lost partial movement in one of his hands due to an accident and received a pension for it. Following the incident, he began working part-time jobs, including as a waiter and construction worker. According to his father, Freitas planned to buy a new car to start a career as a driver. Freitas married Marilene Santos Manuel and had three children over the course of their 20-year marriage. In the later stages of their relationship, however, they started to fight constantly. Freitas was arrested for repeatedly beating his wife and was sentenced to six months in prison

The court issued an order prohibiting Freitas from visiting Manuel after his release from prison. As a result, he lived in a condominium in Vila do IAPI, where he had moved in 2018 and met Milena Borges Alves, an elderly caregiver. They later decided to live together. After entering into a stable union, the couple planned to formalise their marriage at a notary’s office in December 2020. Freitas had four children from previous relationships, ranging in age from nine to twenty-two, as well as a stepdaughter.

== Death ==
On November 19, 2020, the day before Black Consciousness Day, Freitas was murdered by security guards after arguments with them: He beat one of the guards before he quit, but then the guards began beating Freitas until he was unconscious, ignoring several bystanders who attempted to stop them.

Freitas was killed by mechanical asphyxiation at his age of 40. A large protest against racism towards Black people quickly spread across Brazil after his death, and the guards and staff were arrested for murder.

== Personal life ==
Freitas was a fan of Esporte Clube São José. He enjoyed barbecue and beer with friends. He regularly attended the club’s games from the north of Porto Alegre. The fan club had stated a memory of him. According to the police, Freitas had a criminal record for domestic violence, threats, and illegal possession of firearms.

== See also ==
- George Floyd
