= Killing of João Alberto Silveira Freitas =

2020 killing in Brazil

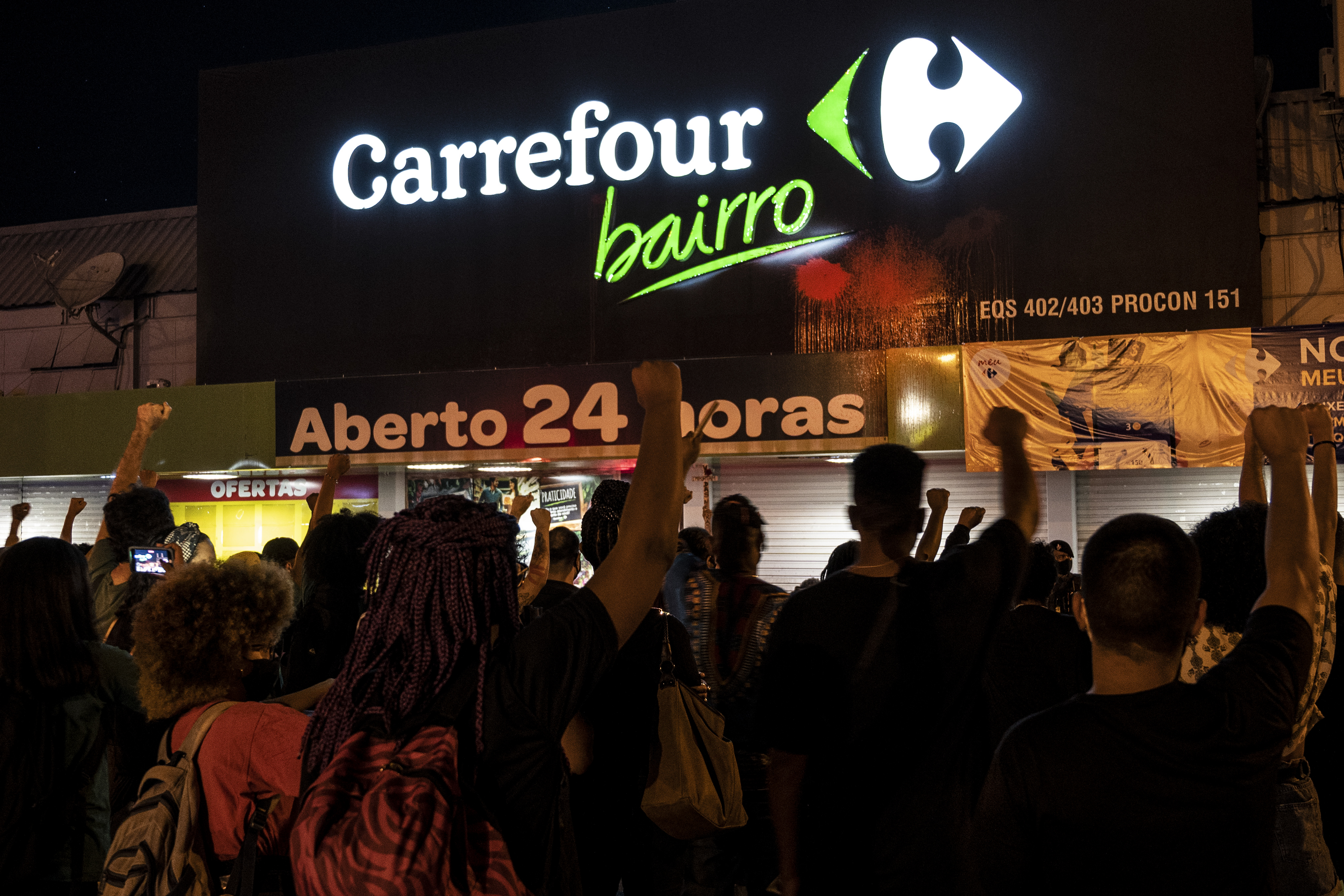
- Demonstrators gathered in front of a Carrefour unit in Brasília to protest the death of João Alberto Freitas
- Date: November 19, 2020
- Location: Hypermarket Carrefour Passo d'Areia, in Porto Alegre, Rio Grande do Sul; 30.01303°S 51.17080°W
- Type: triple-qualified homicide with eventual intent
- Theme: beating and murder by asphyxiation
- Deaths: João Alberto Silveira Freitas
- Accused: Giovane Gaspar da Silva, Magno Braz Borges, Adriana Alves Dutra, Paulo Francisco da Silva, Kleiton Silva Santos and Rafael Rezende

On the night of November 19, 2020, João Alberto Silveira Freitas, a 40-year-old black man, who worked as a service provider, was beaten and killed by asphyxiation at the hands of security guards at a Carrefour store, located in the Passo d'Areia neighborhood, in the northern part of the city of Porto Alegre, in the state of Rio Grande do Sul. He was buried on November 21 in Porto Alegre. The murder started a series of anti-racism protests in several Brazilian cities.

Six people were indicted by the Public Ministry for homicide, including two security guards (one of them a temporary military police officer) and four Carrefour employees.

== Victim and suspects ==
=== João Alberto Freitas ===
João Alberto Freitas was born in 1980 in Humaitá, the second son of João Batista Rodrigues Freitas, a driver. He had two marriages and four children. Locals described Freitas as friendly and happy.

=== Giovane Gaspar da Silva ===
Giovane Gaspar da Silva, aged 24 at the time, was one of the security guards arrested for the attack. He was a temporary military police officer, working for Military Brigade of Rio Grande do Sul since 2018 and allegedly did not have the license required to work as a private security guard.

=== Magno Braz Borges ===
Magno Braz Borges, aged 30 at the time, was another security guard arrested for the attack. He was licensed to work as security guard but his professional bond with Vector, the company responsible for security in the Carrefour unit, was not in database records of Federal Police of Brazil, the agency in charge of regulating the profession.

=== Adriana Alves Dutra ===
Adriana Alves Dutra was a Carrefour Passo d'Areia unit employee. During the occurrence, she was allegedly seen standing beside the men on the ground and seemed to give orders through the radio. She also reportedly threatened people who were filming the crime.

== The murder ==
On November 19, 2020, the day before Black Consciousness Day, João Alberto Silveira Freitas, a forty-year-old black man, was murdered by security guards Magno Braz Borges and Giovane Gaspar da Silva, an ex-military man and a temporary military police officer, in a Carrefour hypermarket store, located in the Parthenon neighborhood, on the east side of the city of Porto Alegre, in Rio Grande do Sul. Both were hired by Vector, and Silva was not authorized to work as a security guard.

After a disagreement at the store, two security guards and the inspector Adriana Alves Dutra followed the victim from the cashier to the parking lot. Freitas attacked Silva, one of the security guards, with a punch on the way out and, from then on, he was grabbed and attacked with several kicks and punches. Fifteen seconds beginning their attack, the security guards knocked him to the ground and continued to throw punches and kicks at him. Despite the intervention of several witnesses and the victim's wife, the two security guards continued beating Freitas as inspector Dutra and other Carrefour employees intimidated witnesses, making it difficult to record the crime and preventing witnesses from assisting Freitas. According to witnesses, Freitas asked for help and begged them to let him breathe. A delivery man who was at the scene and filmed the homicide reported that the killers tried to delete the video and threatened him. In addition, security guards prevented other people from intervening, even with screams that they were killing the man.

In the end, Freitas was killed by mechanical asphyxiation. Security guards had immobilized him by means of excessive weight on his back, similar to the means by which Derek Chauvin had murdered George Floyd in Minneapolis six months earlier. When Freitas stopped responding, the security guards ceased the assaults and asked someone to check the victim's vital signs. A witness checked Freitas's vital signs and found that he was dead. Dutra then called the Military Brigade, but only after seven minutes had passed after the end of the attacks did she ask SAMU for help. In this call, she falsely stated that the victim would have fought with other customers and that he was "feeling sick".

According to the Civil Police investigation, Dutra gave false explanations about the reason for the victim's restraint, lied about having been assaulted, and commanded the action of three employees to prevent other people from helping Freitas. Paulo Francisco da Silva pulled Freitas's wife by the arm, thereby preventing her from helping her husband and intimidating the other people present not to film the scene or approach. Rafael Rezende and Kleiton Silva Santos, meanwhile, helped immobilize Freitas and attacked him with kicks, the latter also throwing punches at the victim.

The security guards were arrested preemptively and accused of triple homicide: for futile reasons, by suffocation, and by a means that prevents the victim from defending himself. On November 24, Dutra was arrested in preventive manner.

Freitas's body was buried on November 21, at the São João Municipal Cemetery, in Porto Alegre. His coffin was wrapped with the flag of Esporte Clube São José, a club in the North Zone of Porto Alegre of which he was a fan. There was applause and calls for justice.

== Repercussions ==
=== Protests ===
Freitas's killing provoked a wave of demonstrations in front of Carrefour stores across the country on November 20, Black Consciousness Day. In Porto Alegre, there was a protest in front of the Carrefour unit in which Freitas was murdered, with approximately 2,500 demonstrators. Some groups entered the unit, protesting through the depredation of the store. The main slogans were "Black lives matter" and the requests for justice for Beto, as he was known.

Protests were repeated in São Paulo, where a Carrefour branch was set on fire. There were demonstrations in the streets of São Paulo, with many protesters demanding justice and asking for a boycott of the hypermarket chain that has already been involved in several previous cases of violence. On November 21, the inscription "Black lives matter" was painted on Avenida Paulista. Protests also took place in other cities in the state, such as Jundiaí, Osasco, Santos, Santo André and São Vicente.

In Rio de Janeiro, one of the chain's units in Barra da Tijuca was forcibly closed by demonstrators, who stood in front of the store with a large banner with the phrase "Stop killing us". Musicians Tico Santa Cruz, Nego do Borel and Pretinho da Serrinha participated in the act, in addition to actress Patrícia Pillar. Protests also took place in the municipality of Belford Roxo, also in the state of Rio de Janeiro.

In Belo Horizonte, the population also took to the streets with signs with words like "Carrefour racist" and "stop killing us". Rapper Djonga participated in the act, sharing the activity on his social networks. In the city of Contagem, also in Minas Gerais, a Carrefour store was closed during protests in the municipality.

In Recife, protests took place in the parking lot of a company unit, calling for a boycott and writing anti-racist messages on the sidewalk and asphalt. The Pernambuco Military Police used pepper spray to disperse the demonstrators, and one person was arrested.

In Salvador, protests took place on November 22, organized by groups defending quilombola rights and organized supporters of Esporte Clube Bahi.

In Manaus, a group of forty people demonstrated on November 21, in front of Carrefour in the Adrianópolis neighborhood, by placing posters on the grid in front of the supermarket, and gathering on the sidewalk. Protesters recalled cases of racism in Amazonas, and acts of violence against indigenous people.

Seven days after the murder, Carrefour stores in the country only opened at 2 pm, with the exception of the unit where Freitas was killed, which did not operate.

=== Public statements ===
The governor of Rio Grande do Sul, Eduardo Leite, made a public statement to ensure that Freitas's murder would be thoroughly investigated. Nelson Marchezan Júnior, mayor of Porto Alegre, offered solidarity to the Freitas family through the social network Twitter. The candidates for the second round of municipal elections in Porto Alegre, Manuela d'Ávila and Sebastião Melo, also showed up.

President Jair Bolsonaro, in turn, did not offer condolences to the family and, at a G20 meeting, the day after the murder, questioned the existence of racism in Brazil, claiming that miscegenation is the essence of the Brazilian people and "that there are those who want to destroy it, and put in its place conflict, resentment, hatred and division between races, always masquerading as a struggle for equality or social justice". Vice President Hamilton Mourão lamented the unpreparedness of the supermarket security agents, but also defended the absence of racism in Brazil.

The president of the Federal Supreme Court, Luiz Fux, asked for a minute of silence in memory of Freitas, during a ceremony that announced the partnership between Faculdade Zumbi dos Palmares and the National Council of Justice. In addition to Fux, justices Alexandre de Moraes, Gilmar Mendes and Luís Roberto Barroso mourned the death of Freitas, stating that the case demonstrates the need to combat structural racism in Brazil.

The President of the Chamber of Deputies, Rodrigo Maia, and the President of the Federal Senate, Davi Alcolumbre, also mourned the death and sent condolences to the Freitas family, and highlighted the need to combat racism at the institutional level. On November 24, the creation of an external commission from the Chamber of Deputies was authorized to monitor the investigation into the murder of João Alberto. The commission is coordinated by Deputy Damião Feliciano, and is also composed of five other deputies: Benedita da Silva, Bira do Pindaré, Silvia Cristina, Áurea Carolina and Orlando Silva.

The United Nations Organization stated, in a statement, that the murder of Freitas is "an act that highlights the different dimensions of racism and the inequalities found in the Brazilian social structure". A spokeswoman for the organization's Human Rights Council called for a "prompt, thorough, independent, impartial and transparent" investigation and that it should "examine whether racial prejudice played a role". In a note, Amnesty International classified the homicide as inadmissible. The international press also covered the case, comparing it to the murder of George Floyd, which occurred months earlier in the United States, and which provoked a series of demonstrations around the world.

Porto Alegre football clubs, such as Grêmio, Internacional and São José, of which he was a supporter, demonstrated after the murder of Freitas, preaching the permanent fight against racial discrimination. Formula 1 driver Lewis Hamilton posted a photo of a protest against death in Porto Alegre with the caption "another black life lost".

== Investigation ==
On December 11, 2020, delegate Roberta Bertoldo, from the Civil Police, indicted security guards Giovane Gaspar da Silva (temporary police officer of the Military Brigade ), Magno Braz Borges and four supermarket employees, Adriana Alves Dutra, Paulo Francisco da Silva, Kleiton Silva Santos and Rafael Rezende for triple homicide (for a base reason, asphyxiation and an appeal that made it impossible for the victim to defend himself). Although the police chief's report cited structural racism in the analysis of the context of the crime, none of the defendants was accused of the crime of racism. Furthermore, the investigation concluded that Freitas had not committed a criminal act on the night of his murder at Carrefour, contrary to what the accused had said.

The six indicted by the police were denounced by the State Public Prosecutor's Office (MP-RS), on December 17, for triple-qualified homicide with possible intent (awkward motive, cruel means and resource that made it difficult for the victim to defend himself). The complaint was accepted by Judge Cristiane Busatto Zardo, from the 2nd Jury Court of Porto Alegre, who considered that there was sufficient evidence of authorship in the piece prepared by the MP-RS, and the six accused became defendants. The judge in charge of the case determined that the crime be reconstituted in February 2021. In April, she authorized the General Institute of Expertise (IGP) proceeded with the simulated reproduction of the facts. However, the IGP, at the time, was not performing procedures that required the presence of many people, allegedly because of the COVID-19 pandemic.

Until February 2021, Giovane da Silva and Magno Borges remained in custody and Adriana Dutra was under house arrest. The other defendants responded to the process in freedom. Silva was expelled from the Military Brigade in December 2020.

In June 2021, Carrefour closed an agreement worth 120 million reals, and is exempt from any lawsuit due to the Conduct Adjustment Term (TAC). The agreement was criticized by the Black Coalition for Rights, stating that "The reparation of the social trauma caused by the persistence of brutality and the dehumanization of black bodies will not take place from the financial contribution in exchange for our lives". The coalition also criticized the absence of other organizations representing the black movement during the negotiations.
