= Dinaldo Wanderley =

Brazilian politician, lawyer, and economist (1950–2020)

Mayor of Patos
- In office 1997–2004
- Preceded by: Ivânio Ramalho
- Succeeded by: Nabor Wanderley

Member of the Legislative Assembly of Paraíba
- In office 2007–2010

Personal details
- Born: June 20, 1950 Patos, Paraíba, Brazil
- Died: May 24, 2020 (aged 69) João Pessoa, Paraíba, Brazil
- Party: Brazilian Democratic Movement (PMDB)
- Other political affiliations: Democrats (Brazil) (former)
- Spouse: Edina Guedes Wanderley
- Children: Dinaldinho
- Education: Federal University of Paraíba; Fundação Francisco Mascarenhas
- Profession: Politician, economist, lawyer

Dinaldo Medeiros Wanderley (20 June 1950 – 24 May 2020), better known simply as Dinaldo Wanderley, was a Brazilian politician, lawyer, and economist from the state of Paraíba.

== Life ==
Born on 20 June 1950, in Patos. Wanderley was the son of Dinamérico Wanderley de Sousa, a notary, and Haydée Medeiros Wanderley, a teacher.

Graduated in Economics at Fundação Francisco Mascarenhas in 1975.

Graduated in Law at Federal University of Paraíba in 1980.

In 1996, he was elected Mayor of his birth city of Patos. His term lasted from 1997 to 2000.

In 2000, he was reelected Mayor of Patos and remained from 2001 to 2004.

In 2006, Wanderley was elected Member of the Legislative Assembly of Paraíba. He remained in power from 2007 to 2010.

In 2010, he was reelected State Deputy. This time however, he never took office as the Superior Electoral Court canceled his victorious candidacy due to previous corruption conviction.

== Personal life ==
In 1973, Wanderley married fellow economics student Edina Guedes Wanderley and had three sons and one daughter together.

In 2004, his wife Edina was elected Member of the Legislative Assembly of Paraíba (2003–2006).

One of his sons, Dinaldinho, is also a politician and was also elected a Member of the Legislative Assembly of Paraíba (2015–2016) and is the incumbent Mayor of Patos.

== Death ==
On 24 May 2020, Wanderley died in João Pessoa at the age of 69 due to complications brought on by COVID-19 during the COVID-19 pandemic in Brazil.
