= Olívia Motta =

Brazilian physician and politician

Olivia Motta
- Motta in 2026

Member-elect of the Legislative Assembly of Paraíba
- Incumbent
- Assumed office 1 February 2027

Personal details
- Born: Olivia Motta Wanderley da Nóbrega; 15 April 1991 (age 35) João Pessoa, Paraíba, Paraíba, Brazil
- Party: Republicanos
- Children: 2
- Parent: Nabor Wanderley (father)
- Education: Faculdades de Enfermagem Nova Esperança (FACENE)
- Profession: Physician (radiologist)
- Website: oliviamotta.com.br

Olivia Motta Wanderley da Nóbrega (April 15, 1991) is a Brazilian physician, radiologist, and politician affiliated with the Republicans party. In the 2026 elections, she was elected to a seat in the Legislative Assembly of Paraíba (ALPB).

== Biography ==
=== Frist years and education ===
The granddaughter of Francisca Motta and daughter of Nabor Wanderley, Olivia was born on 15 April 1991 in João Pessoa, the capital of Paraíba. She studied medicine at the Nova Esperança School of Nursing (FACENE), where she later specialized in radiology.

=== Politics ===
In the 2026 elections in Paraíba, she presented herself as the political successor to her grandmother, Francisca Motta, who served six terms in the Legislative Assembly of Paraíba (ALPB). In the race for a seat, Motta received more than 68,000 votes, becoming the woman with the most votes in the history of the ALPB, as well as the third-highest-voted candidate in the general election. Her campaign received more than one million reais from the national directorate of the Republicans, one of the party’s largest contributions in Brazil.

==== Electoral performance ====
Year	Office	Party	Votes	Result	Ref.
2026	State Deputy of Paraíba	Republicanos	67,991	Elected	

== Personal life ==
Olivia is the sister of Hugo Motta, who is also a politician. She is married to businessman Vitor Fernandes, with whom she has two children.
