= Ricardo Coutinho =

Brazilian politician (born 1960)

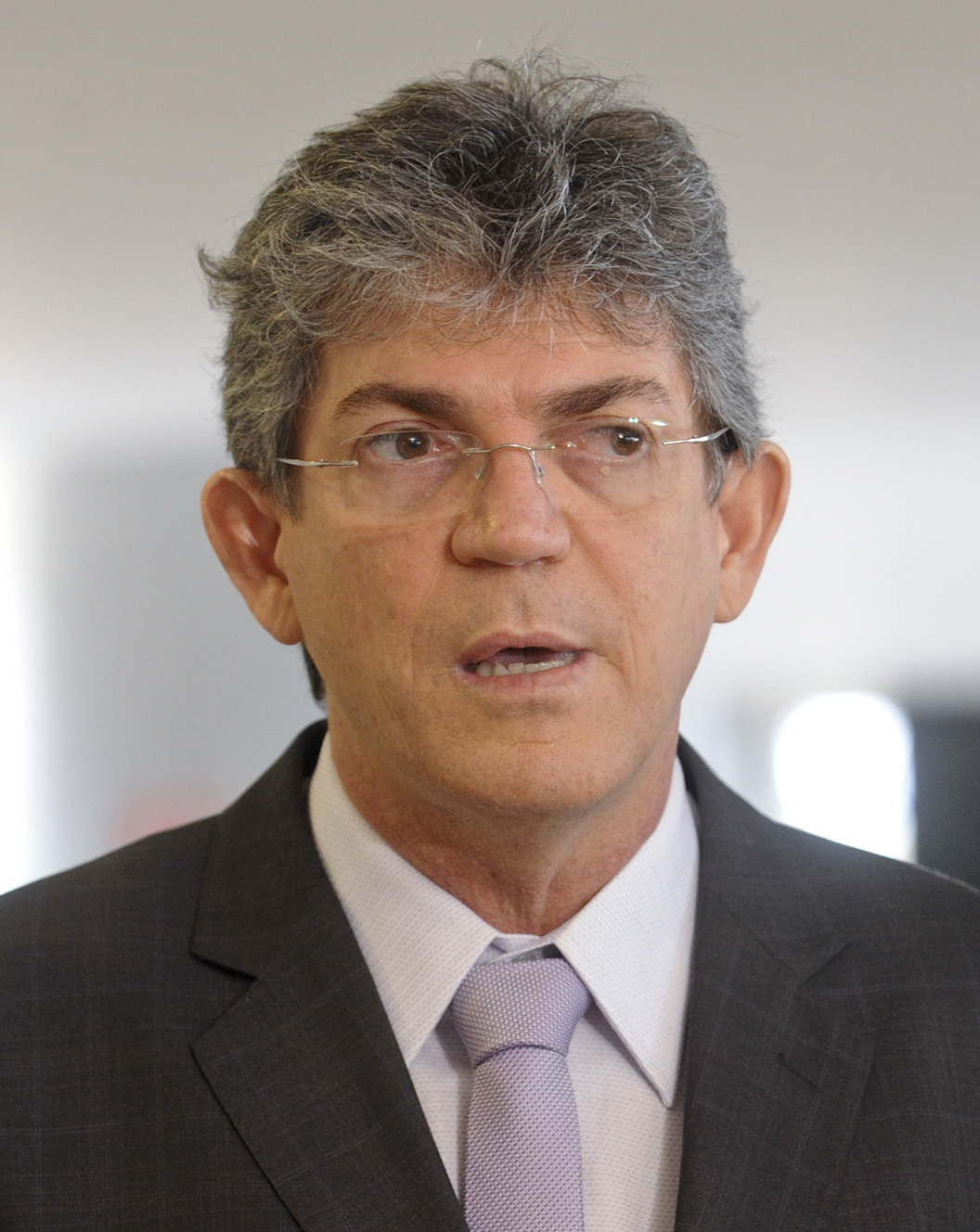
- Coutinho in 2011

Member-elect of the Chamber of Deputies
- Assuming office 1 February 2027
- Constituency: Paraíba

Governor of Paraíba
- In office 1 January 2011 – 1 January 2019
- Vice Governor: Rômulo Gouveia (2011–2014); Lígia Feliciano (2015–2019)
- Preceded by: José Maranhão
- Succeeded by: João Azevêdo

Mayor of João Pessoa
- In office 1 January 2005 – 31 March 2010
- Vice Mayor: Manoel Junior (2005–2009); Luciano Agra (2009–2010)
- Preceded by: Cícero Lucena
- Succeeded by: Luciano Agra

Member of the Legislative Assembly of Paraíba
- In office 1 February 1999 – 1 January 2005
- Constituency: At-large

Member of the Municipal Chamber of João Pessoa
- In office 1 January 1993 – 1 February 1999
- Constituency: Paraíba

Personal details
- Born: Ricardo Vieira Coutinho; 18 November 1960 (age 65) João Pessoa, Paraíba, Brazil
- Party: PT (1982–2003, 2021–present)
- Other political affiliations: PSB (2003–2021)
- Profession: Pharmacist
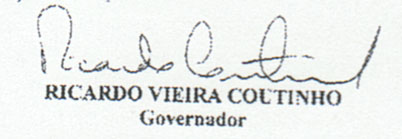
- Signature

Ricardo Vieira Coutinho (born November 18, 1960) is a Brazilian politician who served as the 50th governor of the Brazilian state of Paraíba from 2011 until 2019. Previously, he was the mayor of João Pessoa from 2005 to 2010.

== See also ==
- List of mayors of João Pessoa, Paraíba

Political offices
| Preceded by Cícero Lucena | Mayor of João Pessoa; 2005–2010 | Succeeded by Luciano Agra |
| Preceded by José Maranhão | Governor of Paraíba; 2011–2019 | Succeeded by João Azevêdo |
