= Ruy Carneiro =

Brazilian politician (born 1970)

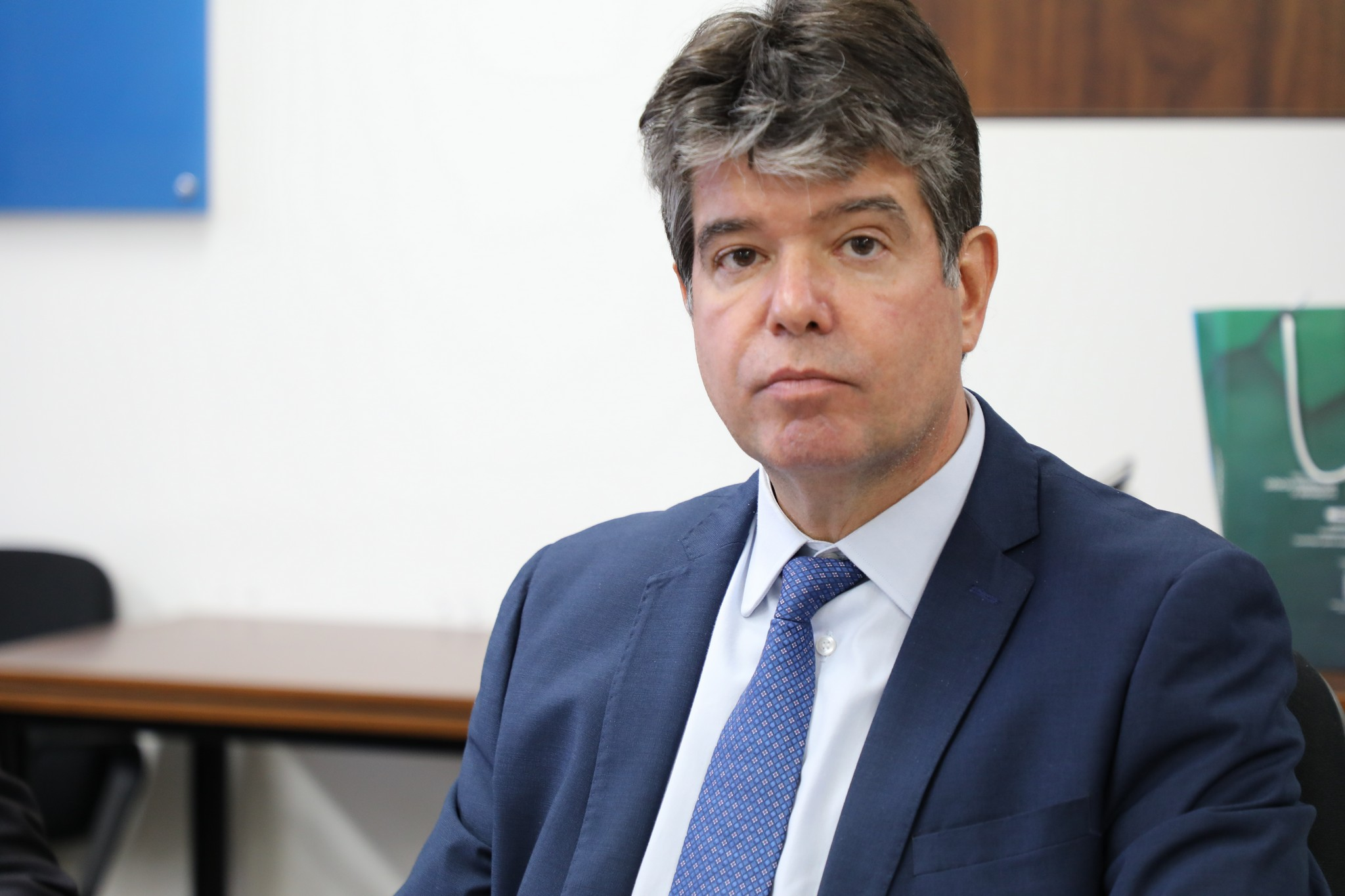
- Carneiro in 2021

Member of the Chamber of Deputies
- Incumbent
- Assumed office 1 February 2019
- Constituency: Paraíba
- In office 1 February 2011 – 1 February 2015
- Constituency: Paraíba

Member of the Legislative Assembly of Paraíba
- In office 1 February 1999 – 1 February 2011
- Constituency: At-large

Member of the Municipal Chamber of João Pessoa
- In office 1 January 1993 – 1 February 1999
- Constituency: At-large

Personal details
- Born: Ruy Manuel Carneiro Barbosa de Aça Belchior; 17 August 1970 (age 56) Rio de Janeiro, Brazil
- Party: PODE (since 2023)
- Other political affiliations: PMDB (1990–2001); PSDB (2001–2022); PSC (2022–2023)

Ruy Manuel Carneiro Barbosa de Aça Belchior (born 17 August 1970) is a Brazilian politician. He has been a member of the Chamber of Deputies since 2019, having previously served from 2011 to 2015. From 1999 to 2011, he was a member of the Legislative Assembly of Paraíba.
