= José Maranhão =

Brazilian politician (1933–2021)

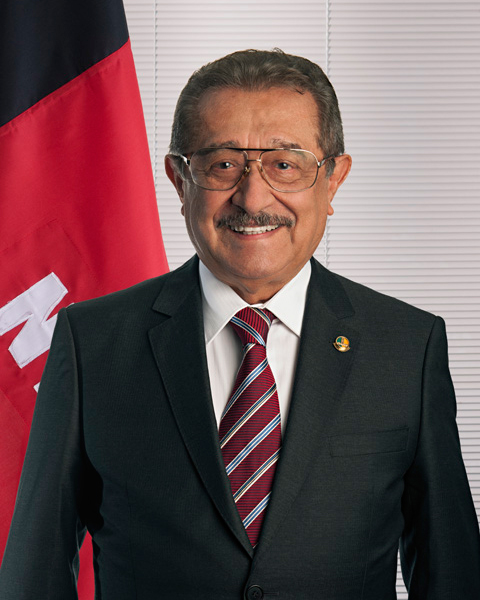

Senator for Paraíba
- In office 1 February 2015 – 8 February 2021
- In office 1 February 2003 – 17 February 2009

Governor of Paraíba
- In office 18 February 2009 – 1 January 2011
- Vice Governor: Luciano Cartaxo
- Preceded by: Cássio Cunha Lima
- Succeeded by: Ricardo Coutinho
- In office 16 September 1995 – 6 April 2002
- Vice Governor: Vacant (1995–99); Roberto Paulino (1999–2002)
- Preceded by: Antônio Mariz
- Succeeded by: Roberto Paulino

Vice Governor of Paraíba
- In office 1 January 1995 – 15 September 1995
- Governor: Antônio Mariz
- Preceded by: Cícero Lucena
- Succeeded by: Roberto Paulino

Federal Deputy from Paraíba
- In office 1 February 1983 – 16 December 1994

State Deputy of Paraíba
- In office 1 February 1955 – 16 January 1969

Personal details
- Born: José Targino Maranhão; 6 September 1933 Araruna, Paraíba, Brazil
- Died: 8 February 2021 (aged 87) São Paulo, Brazil
- Party: PMDB (1966–2021)
- Other political affiliations: PTB (1954–66)
- Spouse: Maria de Fátima Bezerra Cavalcanti
- Children: Maria Alice; Leônidas; Letícia
- Occupation: Lawyer and Entrepreneur

José Targino Maranhão (6 September 1933 – 8 February 2021) was a Brazilian politician who served as governor and senator of Paraíba.

He was the son of Benjamim Gomes Maranhão, ex-mayor of Araruna, Paraíba and Dona Benedita Targino Maranhão (Dona YaYá).

Allied with PMDB, he was state representative, federal representative, senator, vice governor and governor of the state of Paraíba three times.

He died of COVID-19 during the COVID-19 pandemic in Brazil.

== Biography ==
Started his political career as an elected state representative in 1955 for PTB, a party for which he was reelected for two consecutive mandates. In 1967 he allied with PMDB, for which he was elected as state representative, being in charge until 1969.

In 1982 he was promoted to federal representative, and was able to be reelected for this in 1986 for the legislation 1987 - 1991. In 1990 he returned for the job of federal representative, and was elected the same year for the period 1991 - 1994.

In 1994 he was elected vice governor in favor of Antonio Mariz, ending his mandate by the death of the owner, about ten months after he assumed the office of governor. In 1998 he contested the candidacy for reelection to the state government by the PMDB, where the group led by Senator Ronaldo Cunha Lima and his son, the mayor of Campina Grande, Cassio Cunha Lima, wanted to give the name of Ronaldo to dispute the government. With a narrow lead, Maranhão wins from Ronaldo at the convention and the PMDB candidate is nominated. In the election for governor, was elected with about 80% of the votes, and the Governor most votes in the country that year in percentage terms, thus re-electing the governor of Paraíba.

In 2001 the family Cunha Lima migrates to PSDB and Maranhão breaks political contact with them. The year after Maranhão renounces the state government to candidate himself to the senate gaining 831.083 votes, which makes him the senator most voted in Paraíba during that election. In the state government he is replaced by vice-governor Roberto Paulino, who he supports to become the government candidate for PMDB, but is eventually defeated by Cassio Cunha Lima Paulino who wins in the second turn. In 2006, the government again disputed Maranhão Paraíba, this time against the governor Cassio Cunha Lima, who was elected in a runoff for re-election with about 51% of the vote. After confirmation by the Superior Electoral Court the forfeiture of Cunha Lima in 2008 by Regional Electoral Court of Paraíba for the misuse of social programs in an election year, Jose Maranhao is re-elected on 17 February 2009 by Palace of Redemption as the state governor, for being the runner-up in the 2006 elections. Governor for the third time Paraíba, Maranhão compete again for the post of governor of the state elections of 2010, seeking his fourth term, but is eventually defeated in the second round again, this time by the former mayor of Joao Pessoa and his former political ally Ricardo Coutinho of PSB who obtained 53.70% of the votes against 46.30% José Maranhão.

Political offices
Preceded by Cícero Lucena	Vice Governor of Paraíba; 1995	Vacant Title next held by Roberto Paulino
Preceded by Antônio Mariz	Governor of Paraíba; 1995–2002; 2009–11	Succeeded by Roberto Paulino
Preceded by Cássio Cunha Lima	Governor of Paraíba; 1995–2002; 2009–11	Succeeded by Ricardo Coutinho
