= Ronaldo Cunha Lima =

Brazilian poet and politician

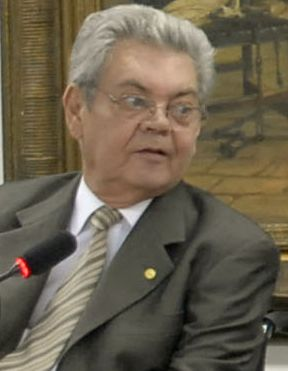

Governor of Paraíba
- In office 15 March 1991 – 2 April 1994
- Preceded by: Tarcísio Burity
- Succeeded by: Cícero Lucena

Senator from Paraíba
- In office 1 February 1995 – 31 January 2003

Personal details
- Born: 18 March 1936 Guarabira, Paraíba, Brazil
- Died: 7 July 2012 (aged 76) João Pessoa, Paraíba, Brazil

Ronaldo Cunha Lima (18 March 1936 – 7 July 2012) was a Brazilian poet and politician. He served as the governor of Paraíba from 1991 to 1994.

== Early life ==
Cunha Lima was born on 18 March 1936, in Guarabira, Paraíba. He moved with his family to the city of Campina Grande, the second most populous city in Paraíba, when he was young. He received a legal studies degree from the Federal University of Paraíba, serving as Vice President of a political, student organization called Centro Estudantil Campinense while attending the university.

== Political career ==
=== Assassination attempt on Tarcísio Burity ===
A notorious incident occurred while Cunha Lima was governor, following an incident where former governor Tarcísio Burity accused Cunha Lima's son Cássio Cunha Lima of corruption with respect to siphoning off money to be used for drought relief. On 5 November 1993, Governor Cunha Lima entered the Gulliver Restaurant in João Pessoa and shot his predecessor, former governor Burity, twice while Burity was eating. Burity spent days in a coma, but eventually recovered. After hours of being jailed, Cunha Lima was greeted on his balcony by a large crowd of fans that supported him defending his family's honor. A few days after the shooting, the city council of Campina Grande presented Cunha Lima with a medal of merit.

== Death ==
Cunha Lima died of complications from lung cancer at his family's home in João Pessoa, Brazil, on 7 July 2012, at the age of 76. A public viewing was held at the Palácio da Redenção. He was buried in the Monte Santo cemetery. Survivors included his son, Senator Cássio Cunha Lima.
