= Gustavo Feliciano =

Brazilian politician (born 1983)

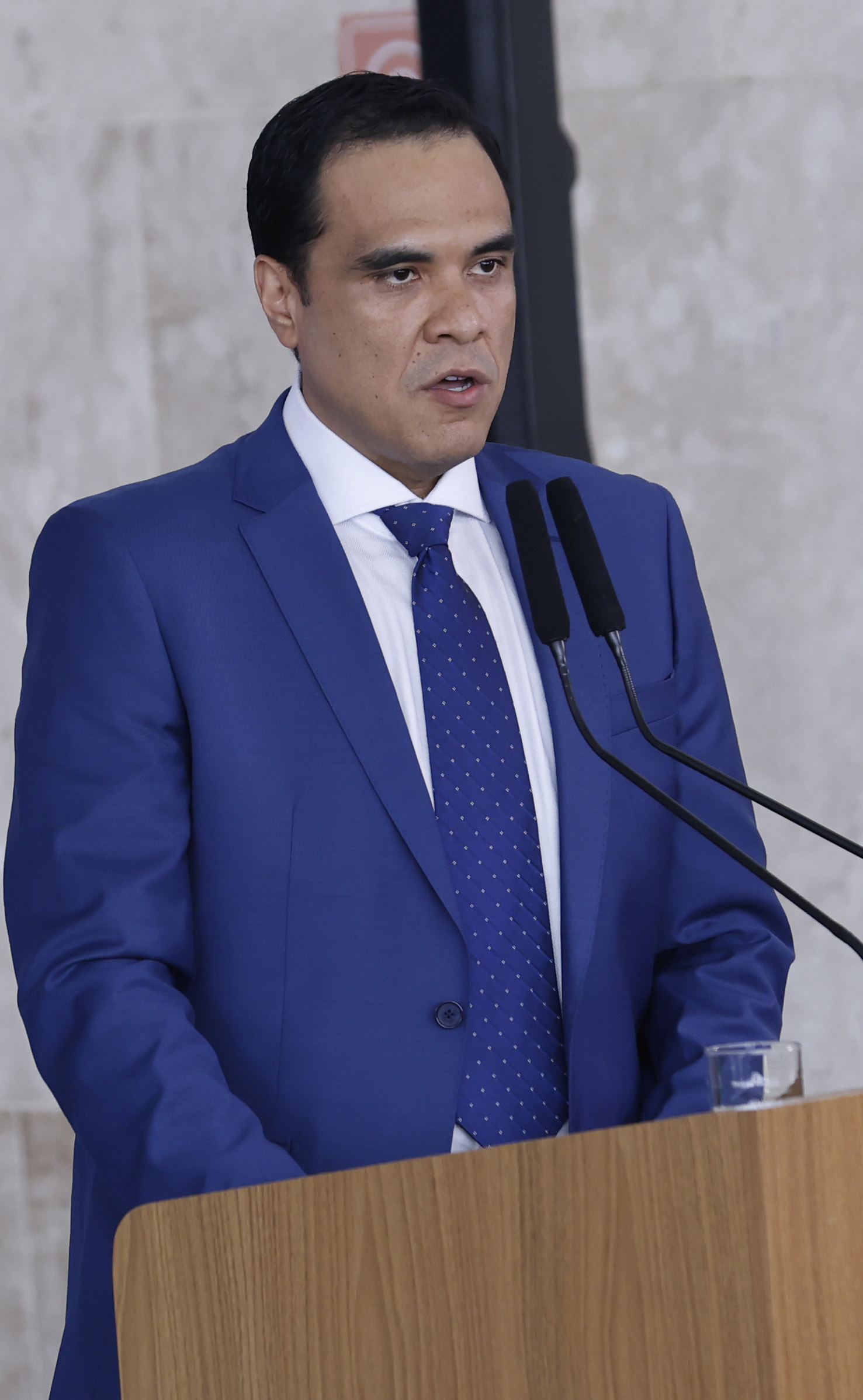
- Feliciano in 2025

Minister of Tourism
- Incumbent
- Assumed office 23 December 2025
- President: Luiz Inácio Lula da Silva
- Preceded by: Celso Sabino

Personal details
- Born: 12 February 1983 (age 43)
- Party: Independent
- Parents: Damião Feliciano (father); Lígia Feliciano (mother)

Gustavo Damião Feliciano (born 12 February 1983) is a Brazilian politician serving as minister of tourism since 2025. He is the son of Damião Feliciano and Lígia Feliciano.
