= Silvia Cristina =

Brazilian teacher, activist and politician

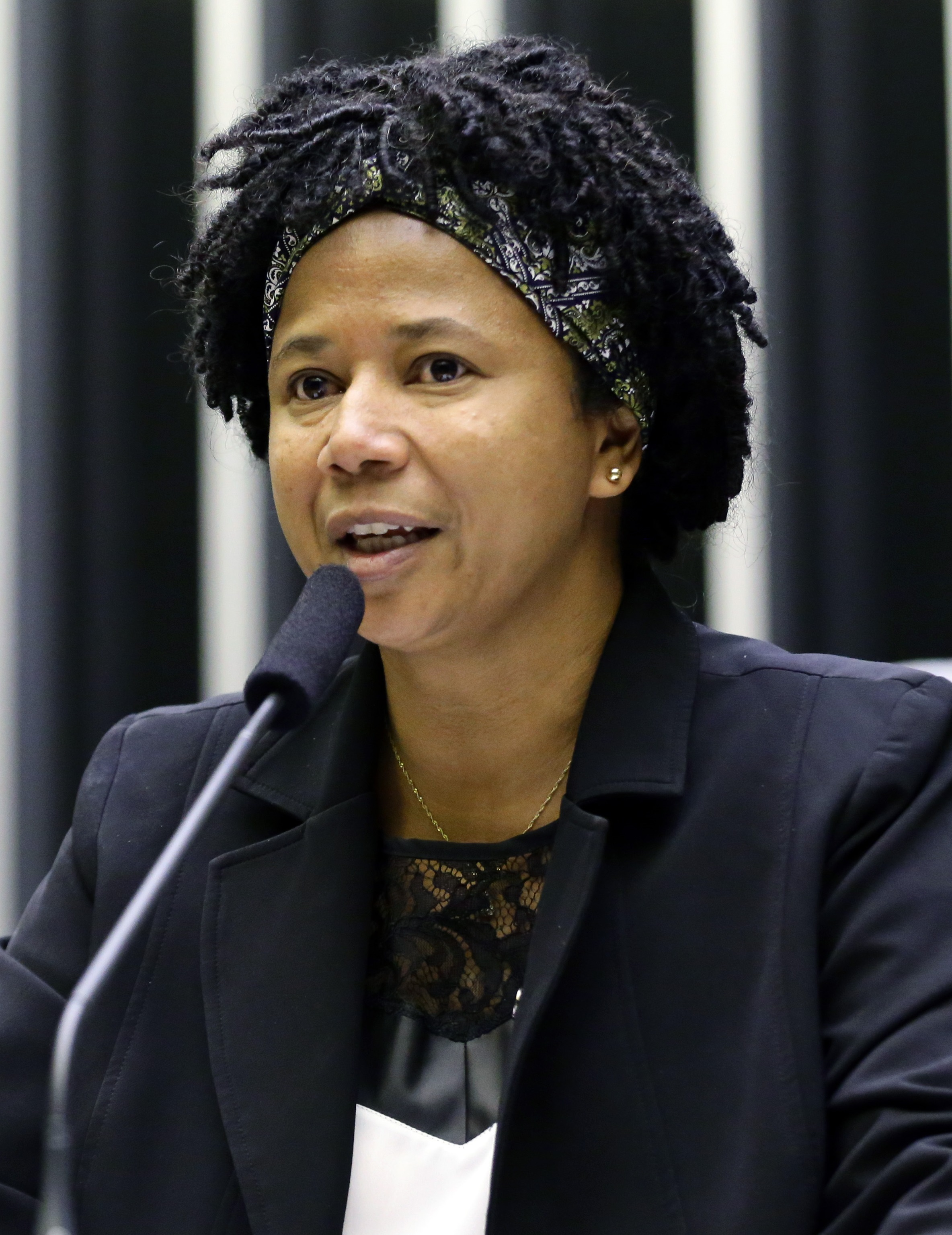

Federal Deputy for Rondônia
- Incumbent
- Assumed office 1 February 2019

Councilwoman of Ji-Paraná
- In office 1 January 2013 – 31 January 2018

Personal details
- Born: Sílvia Cristina Amancio Chagas; 15 January 1974 (age 52) Linhares, Espírito Santo, Brazil
- Party: PSDB (1995–2007); PDT (2007–2022); PL (2022–2024); PP (2024–present)

Sílvia Cristina Amancio Chagas (born 15 January 1974) is a Brazilian journalist and politician who has been a federal deputy from the state of Rondônia since 2019. She is the first Black woman to represent the state in the Chamber of Deputies.

== Biography ==
Born in Linhares, Espírito Santo, she was previously a councilwoman for the city of Ji-Paraná. She is currently affiliated with the Liberal Party (PL).

On 24 November 2020, the creation of an external commission from the Chamber of Deputies was authorized to monitor the investigation into the murder of João Alberto Silveira Freitas in Porto Alegre. The commission is coordinated by deputy Damião Feliciano, and is also composed of five other deputies: Benedita da Silva, Bira do Pindaré, Silvia Cristina, Áurea Carolina and Orlando Silva.

In 2016, Silvia Cristina had been diagnosed with cancer. As of 2018, she received treatment through surgery for the cancer.
