= Humaitá, Rio Grande do Sul =

Municipality of Rio Grande do Sul, Brazil

Coordinates: 27.568°S 53.970°W

Humaitá
- Municipality
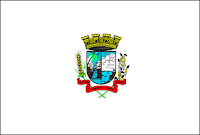
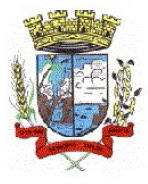
- Flag Coat of arms

- Location of Humaitá in Rio Grande do Sul
- Country: Brazil
- Region: South
- State: Rio Grande do Sul
- Mesoregion: Noroeste Rio-Grandense
- Microregion: Três Passos
- Founded: 18 February 1959

Government
  - Mayor: Paulo Antonio Schwade (MDB, 2021 - 2024)

Area
  - Total: 135.01 km^{2} (52.13 sq mi)

Population (2021)
  - Total: 4,712
  - Density: 34.90/km^{2} (90.39/sq mi)
- Demonym: Humaitense
- Time zone: UTC−3 (BRT)
- Website: Official website

Humaitá is a municipality in the state of Rio Grande do Sul, Brazil.

It occupies an area of 135.246 km^{2}. Its population is 4,736 (2020 est.).

== See also ==
- List of municipalities in Rio Grande do Sul
