= Passo d'Areia =

Neighborhood in Porto Alegre, Brazil

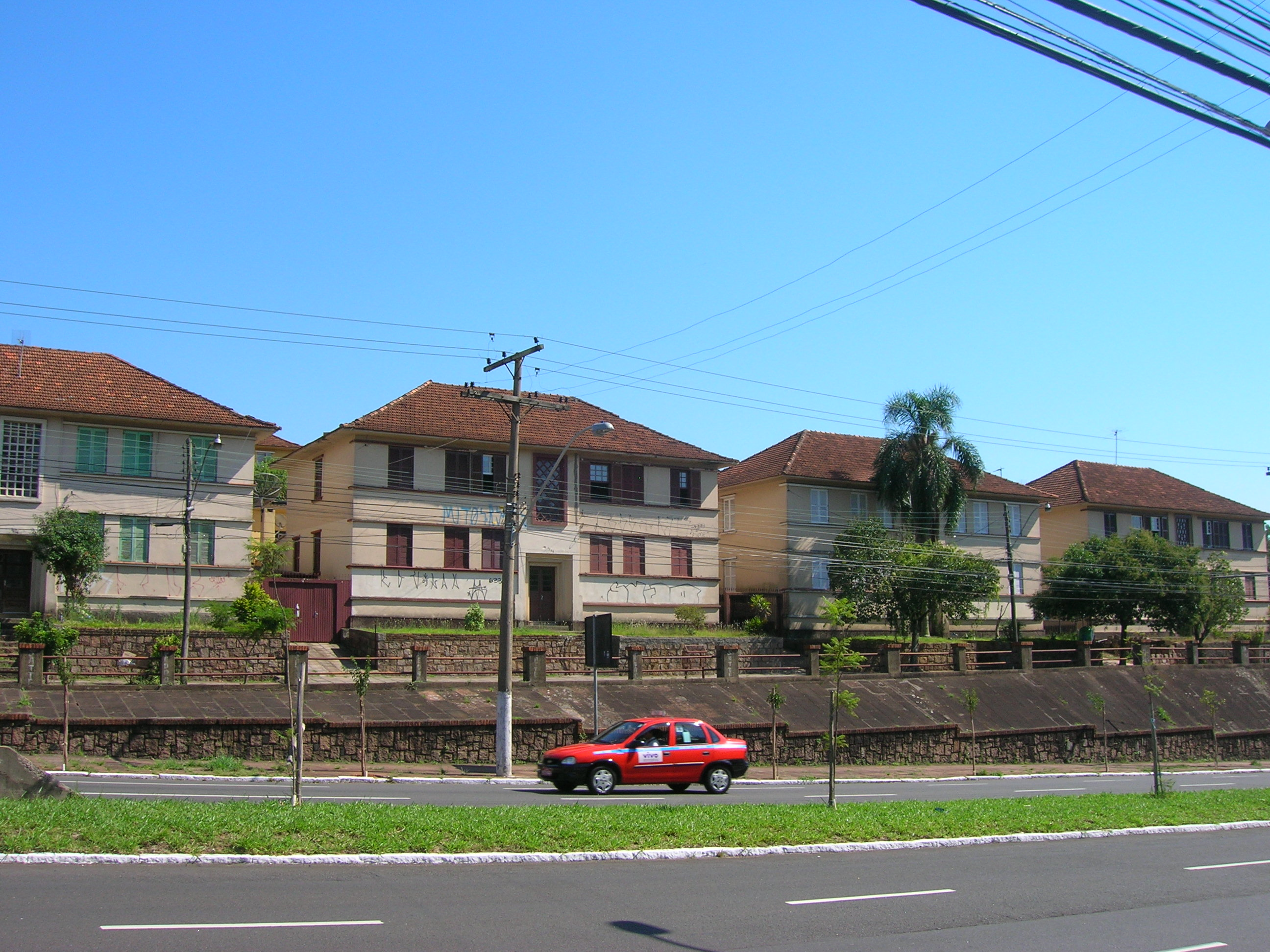
Residential blocks built for proletarians in the 1950s.

Passo d'Areia is a neighborhood (bairro) in the city of Porto Alegre, the state capital of Rio Grande do Sul in Brazil. Two big shopping malls of the city, Iguatemi and Bourbon Country, are located here.

== Notable people ==
- Elis Regina, singer
