= Federal University of Campina Grande =

Academic publisher

- Universidade Federal de Campina Grande
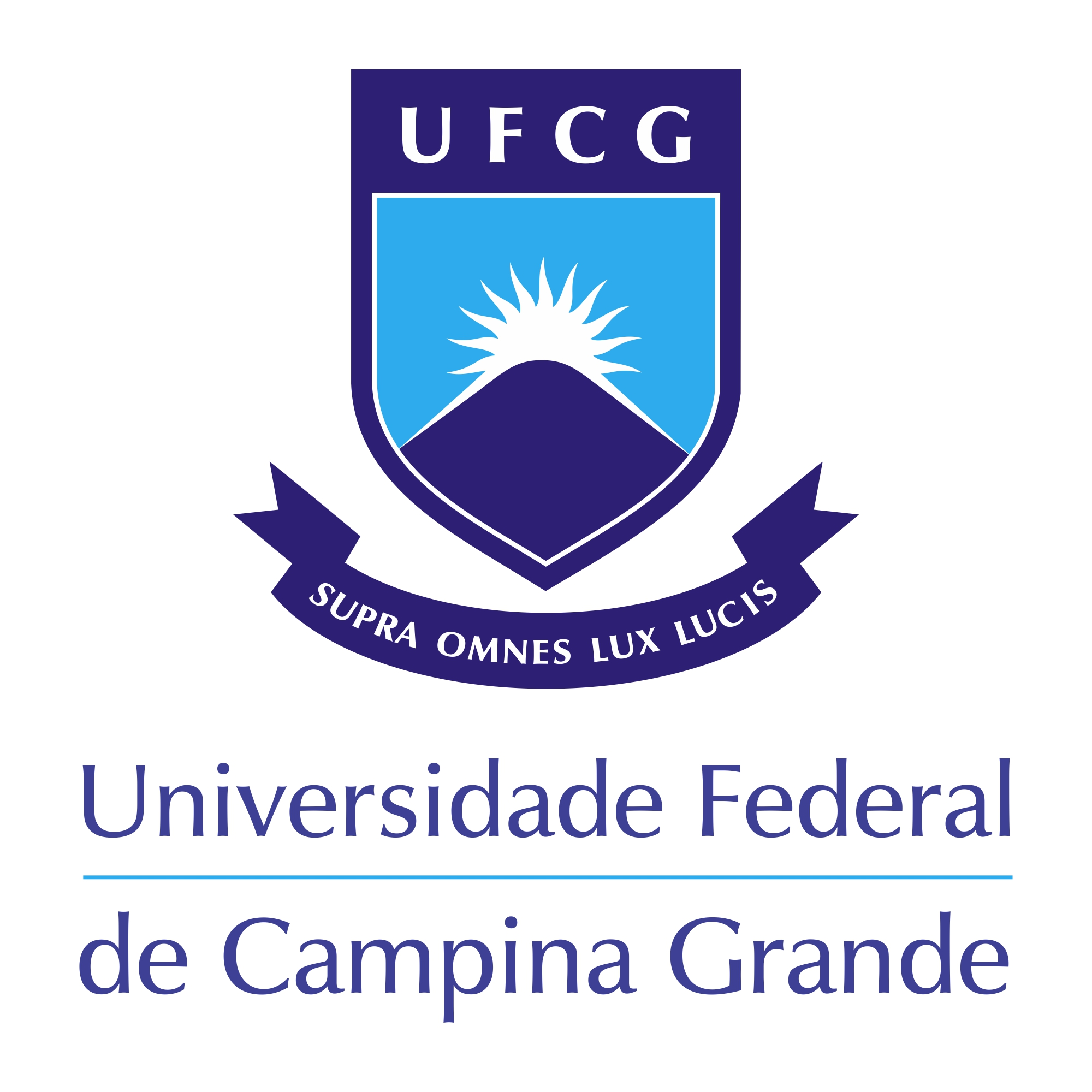
- Other names: UFCG
- Motto: Supra Omnis Lux Lucis (Above man shines the light)
- Type: Public
- Established: 1952 - Paraíba State Polytechnical School; 1970 - Became part of UFPB; 2002 - Established as UFCG
- Endowment: R$ 658.481.753,00 (2015)
- Chancellor: Dr. Vicemário Simões
- Academic staff: 1500+
- Administrative staff: 2,000+
- Undergraduates: 10.000+
- Postgraduates: 400+
- Location: Campina Grande, Paraíba, Brazil; 7°13′00.80″S 35°54′38.00″W
- Website: ufcg.edu.br

The Federal University of Campina Grande (Portuguese: Universidade Federal de Campina Grande, UFCG) is a public research university located in Campina Grande, Paraíba, Brazil. Together with the Federal University of Paraíba, it is the main university of the state of Paraíba. It was established after splitting from UFPB in 2002.

UFCG is one of the leading technological and scientific institutes of northeastern Brazil. It was mentioned in a 2001 edition of Newsweek magazine as a technopole - among 9 other around the world - that represents a new vision for technology. It was again quoted in 2003 as the Brazilian Silicon Valley. It is one of the five institutions to have a continuous international concept from the Coordenadoria de Aperfeiçoamento de Pessoal de Nível Superior (grade over 5) in the Electrical Engineering Postgraduate Program, and one of the two to simultaneously hold a concept of 5 stars in the Technological Department (Electrical Engineering and Computer Science) from the Ministry of Education.

== History ==
The higher education in the state of Paraíba has its origins in the creation of its first high education school, the Northeastern School of Agronomy, in 1934, in the town of Areia.

In the 1950s, a government initiative called "integration of the technical-industrial development of the State", made Campina Grande a new scientific and cultural center in Paraíba, which made possible the creation of the Polytechnic School - The embryo of the UFCG. It focused on finances and business applied to regional markets. Funding from the government provided the structure and equipment for the institute, and foreign companies gave endowments.

In 1955, there were eleven Higher education institutes in Paraíba. The Universidade Federal da Paraíba was established in December 1960, by state law nº 1,366. Its federalization was installed by law nº 3,835. In 1973, the university council approved the reform of the academic structure of the institution, in resolution nº 12/73, accordingly with decrees nºs 53 and 252, and law nº 5.540.

IBM Mainframe

In 1963 the Polytechnic school started to offer an Electrical Engineering degree, held by the faculty of the Civil Engineering department. From this year on, there was an influx of professors from the Federal University of Pernambuco (UFPE), and the Aeronautics Technological Institute (ITA) in São Paulo, with whom the university maintained close bonds in the 1960s and 1970s.

In 1967, the UFPB campus in Campina Grande received one of the first supercomputers of Brazil, a US$500,000 IBM mainframe.

The Universidade Federal de Campina Grande was established by law nº 10,419, with its main campus in the city of Campina Grande, and is now composed of the Technological Center, Humanities Center, and Health and Biological Center.

Paqtc-PB

== Technopole ==
With 64 companies in the area of Information Technology, with a total income of approximately R$27 million a year, the technology sector grows every year in Campina Grande, A reason for the opening of so many enterprises is the quality of higher education in the University of Campina Grande and its major degrees in Electrical Engineering and Computing, as well as the creation of the Technopole of Paraíba Paqtc-PB, which provides financial, institutional and technical support for these new companies.

The UFCG Center of Sciences and Technology - CCT and Center of Electrical Engineering and Computing - CEEI are also responsible for developments in this area. Each year almost half the students graduate in technology fields. Multinational companies like Honda, Fiat, Motorola, Coca-Cola, and Samsung recruit graduates each year. Additionally, those companies and others like Hewlett-Packard, Nokia, Petrobras and Northel, Intel, Sony and Foxconn, have formed partnerships with the institution and provide most of the endowment for installation of new laboratories and funding for research projects.

=== Awards ===
- In September 2002 the Technopole won the Innovating Project of the year award promoted by the National Society of Technological Enterprises (Amprotec). .
- In 2001 it ranked first place in the Banco do Brasil National Social Technology award, and also represented Brazil in the UNESCO headquarters in Paris. .
- Mentioned in a 2001 edition of the Newsweek magazine as a technopole - among nine others around the world - that represents a new vision for technology.
- List of technopoles chosen by Newsweek:
  - Akron, Ohio, U.S.
  - Huntsville, Alabama, U.S.
  - Oakland, California, U.S.
  - Omaha, Nebraska, U.S.
  - Tulsa, Oklahoma, U.S.
  - Campina Grande, Paraíba, Brazil
  - Barcelona, Spain
  - Suzhou, China
  - Côte d'Azur, France

== Information ==
Faculty (December 2004)
Center	Masters	Phd
CCT - Technological Center	105	191
CH - Humanity Center	83	43
CCBS - Medicine and Biology Center	27	12

Campus (2004)
	Number
University cafeterias	4
Number of students served(2004)	1,955
Meals served(2004)	606,600
University residences	13

Research (2004)
	Number
Research with external funding in progress	27
Research with internal funding in progress	215
Number of research groups	91
Number of researches in the CNPq database	301

== Degrees ==
- CEEI
  - Electrical Engineering
  - Computer Science
- CCBS
  - Medicine
  - Psychology
  - Nursing
- CCT
  - Agricultural Engineering
  - Civil Engineering
  - Materials Engineering
  - Mining Engineering
  - Mechanical Engineering
  - Chemical Engineering
  - Industrial Design
  - Chemical Technologies
  - Petroleum Engineering
  - Meteorology
  - Physics
  - Mathematics
- CH
  - Business Administration
  - Economics
  - Social Sciences
  - History
  - Literature
  - Philosophy
  - Geography
  - Arts and Media
  - Pedagogy
- CFP
  - Sciences
  - Nursing
  - Geography
  - History
  - Literature
  - Pedagogy
- CSTR
  - Forestal Engineering
  - Veterinary Medicine
  - Dentistry
  - Biology
- CCJS
  - Finances
  - Law

== See also ==
- Brazil University Rankings
- List of federal universities of Brazil
- Universities and Higher Education in Brazil
