= Lucas Ribeiro (footballer, born 2000) =

Uruguayan footballer (born 2000)

Personal information
- Full name: Lucas Nicolás Ribeiro Nelson
- Date of birth: 10 July 2000 (age 26)
- Place of birth: Montevideo, Uruguay
- Height: 1.70 m (5 ft 7 in)
- Position: Forward

Team information
- Current team: Basáñez

Youth career
- Cerro
- 2018: Austria Wien

Senior career*
Years	Team	Apps	(Gls)
2018–2021	Austria Wien II	3	(0)
2020	→ Liverpool Montevideo (loan)	7	(0)
2021	Cerrito	3	(0)
2022	Huracán	10	(0)
2023–	Basáñez	2	(1)
- * Club domestic league appearances and goals as of 1 January 2024

Lucas Nicolás Ribeiro Nelson (born 10 July 2000) is a Uruguayan footballer who plays as a forward for Uruguayan Primera División Amateur club Basáñez.

== Career ==
Formed at youth academy of Cerro, Ribeiro was signed by Austrian club Austria Wien in July 2017. However the transfer was delayed by one year as Ribeiro was aged under 18. He joined the club ahead of 2018–19 season.

Ribeiro joined Liverpool Montevideo in February 2020 on a season long loan deal. He made his professional debut on 8 August 2020 in a 1–1 draw against Rentistas.

In April 2021, Ribeiro joined newly promoted Primera Divisíon side Cerrito.
