= Lucas Ribeiro (politician) =

Brazilian politician (born 1989)

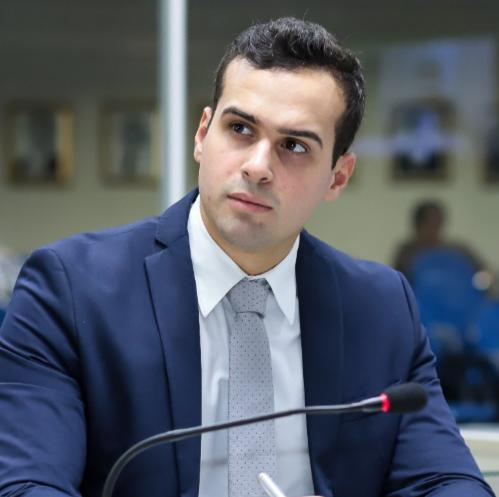
- Ribeiro in 2019

Governor-elect of Paraíba
- Assuming office January 2027
- Lieutenant: Lígia Feliciano (elect)
- Succeeding: João Azevêdo

Vice Governor of Paraíba
- Incumbent
- Assumed office 1 January 2023
- Governor: João Azevêdo
- Preceded by: Lígia Feliciano

Personal details
- Born: 15 August 1989 (age 37)
- Party: Progressistas
- Parent: Daniella Ribeiro (mother)
- Relatives: Enivaldo Ribeiro (grandfather); Aguinaldo Ribeiro (uncle)

Lucas Ribeiro Novais de Araújo (born 15 August 1989) is a Brazilian politician serving as vice governor of Paraíba since 2023. From 2021 to 2022, he served as deputy mayor of Campina Grande. He is the son of Daniella Ribeiro, the nephew of Aguinaldo Ribeiro, and the grandson of Enivaldo Ribeiro.
