= Cássio Cunha Lima =

Brazilian politician

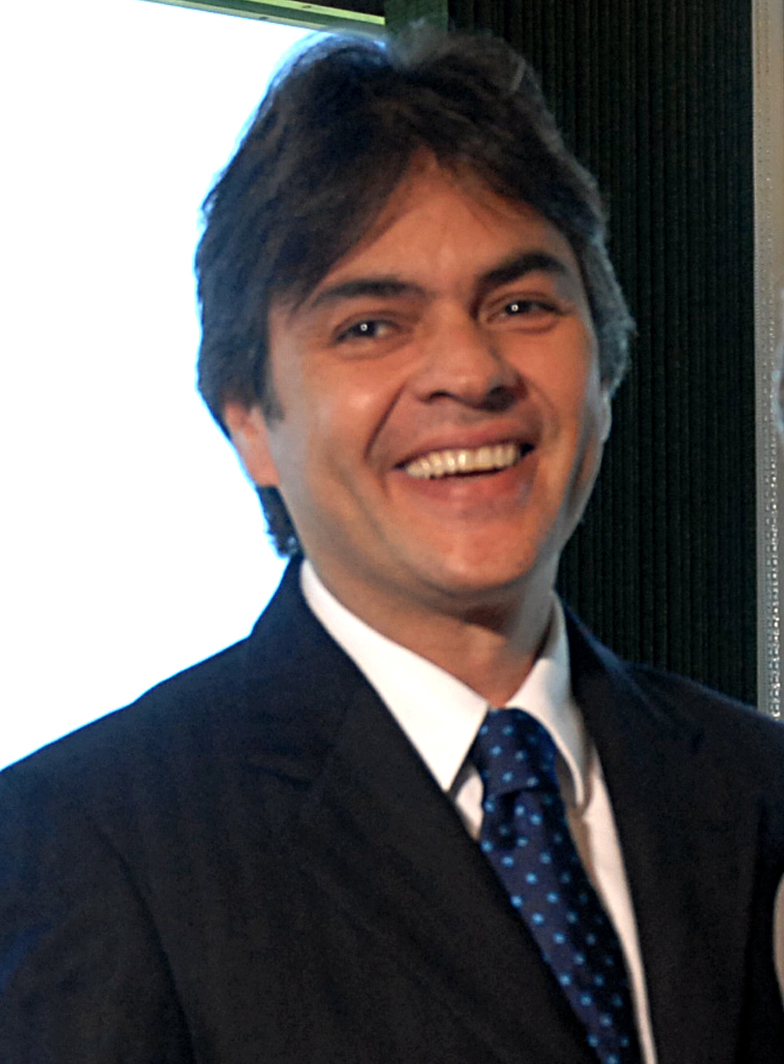
- Cássio in 2006

Governor of Paraíba
- In office January 1, 2003 – February 17, 2009
- Preceded by: Roberto Paulino
- Succeeded by: José Maranhão

Senator from Paraíba
- In office November 8, 2011 – February 1, 2019

Personal details
- Born: April 5, 1963 (age 63) Campina Grande, Paraíba, Brazil
- Website: cassiocunhalima.com.br

Cássio Rodrigues da Cunha Lima (Campina Grande, April 5, 1963) is a Brazilian lawyer and politician, affiliated to the Party of Brazilian Social Democracy (PSDB). He is the son of former governor of Paraíba Ronaldo Cunha Lima. He was governor of Paraiba, mayor of Campina Grande, Federal Deputy and currently is a member of the Brazilian Federal Senate.

He graduated in law from the State University of Paraíba and began his political career in 1986 when he was elected federal deputy by the state of Paraíba.

Political offices
Preceded by Ronaldo Cunha Lima	Mayor of Campina Grande; 1989–1992	Succeeded by Félix Araújo Filho
Preceded by Félix Araújo Filho	Mayor of Campina Grande; 1997–2002	Succeeded by Cozete Barbosa
Preceded by Roberto Paulino	Governor of Paraíba; 2003–2009	Succeeded by José Maranhão
