= Federal University of Paraíba =

Public university in João Pessoa, Brazil

- Universidade Federal da Paraíba
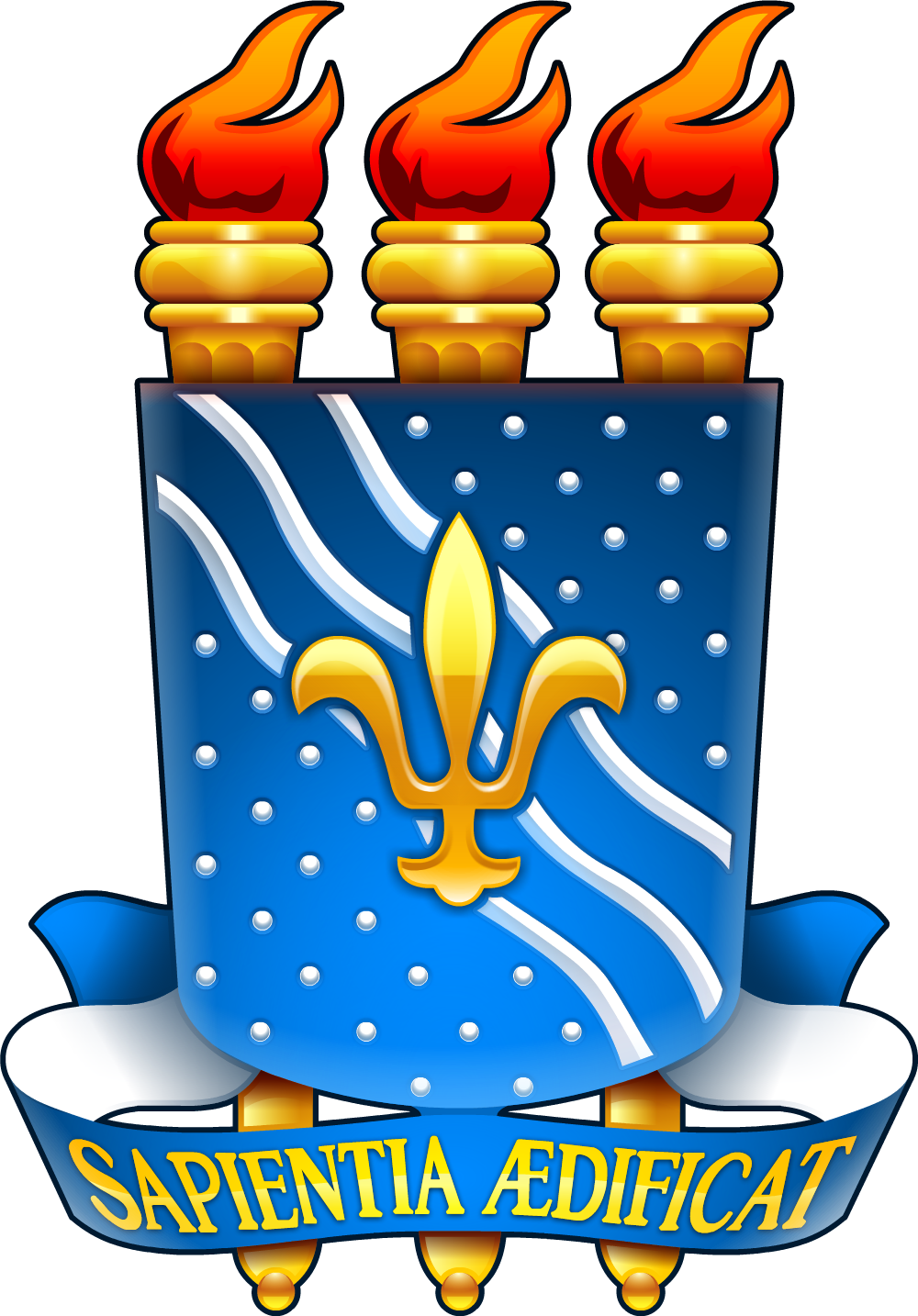
- Other names: UFPB
- Motto: Sapientia Ædificat
- Motto in English: Knowledge Builds
- Type: Public
- Established: December 2, 1955
- Endowment: US$327.6 million
- Students: 39,283
- Undergraduates: 32,991
- Postgraduates: 6,292
- Website: www.ufpb.br

Federal University of Paraíba (Portuguese: Universidade Federal da Paraíba, UFPB) is a public university located in the city of João Pessoa, Paraíba, Brazil. Along with Federal University of Campina Grande, it is the main university in the state of Paraíba, Brazil.

UFPB offers degrees (Bachelor's, Master's and Doctoral) in areas such as the liberal arts (including Law), health sciences (including Medicine and Dentistry), engineering and technology (Computer Science and Computer Engineering), business, education and the fine arts (Music, Theater, Art).

There are also campuses in Areia, Bananeiras and North Coast (Rio Tinto and Mamanguape).

== 2002 campus detachment ==
In 2002 the UFPB, at the time formed by the campuses in João Pessoa, Areia, Campina Grande, Patos, Cajazeiras and Sousa, had four of them detached due to the creation of the Federal University of Campina Grande.

== Campuses and Centres ==
Campus I - João Pessoa

- CBIOTEC - Centre for Biotechnology
- CCHLA - Centre for Human Sciences, Letters, and Arts
- CCSA - Centre for Applied Social Sciences
- CE - Centre for Education
- CCS - Centre for Health Sciences
- CCM - Centre for Medical Sciences
- CCJ - Centre for Law Studies
- CCEN - Centre for Natural and Exact Sciences
- CI - Centre for Informatics
- CTDR - Centre for Technology and Regional Development
- CEAR - Centre for Alternative and Renewable Energy

Campus II - Areia

- Centre for Agrarian Science

Campus III - Bananeiras

- Centre for Human, Social, and Agrarian Sciences

Campus IV - Litoral Norte (Rio Tinto e Mamanguape)

- Centre for Applied Sciences and Education

== See also ==
- Brazil University Rankings
- List of federal universities of Brazil
- Universities and Higher Education in Brazil
