= Legislative Assembly of Paraíba =

Coordinates: 7°7′15″S 35°53′2″W

Legislative Assembly of Paraíba Assembleia Legislativa da Paraíba
- 20th legislature (2023-2027)

Type
- Type: Unicameral

Leadership
- President: Adriano Galdino, Republicans since 1 February 2019
- 1st VP: Felipe Leitão, Republicans
- Government Leader: Chico Mendes, PSB

Structure
- Seats: 36 deputies
- Political groups: Republicans (9) PSB (6) PP (4) Brazil of Hope (3) (Note: PT (2) PCdoB (1)) PL (3) PSDB (3) UNIÃO (3) MDB (2) PSD (2) REDE (1)

Elections
- Voting system: Proportional representation
- Last election: 2 October 2022
- Next election: 2026

Meeting place
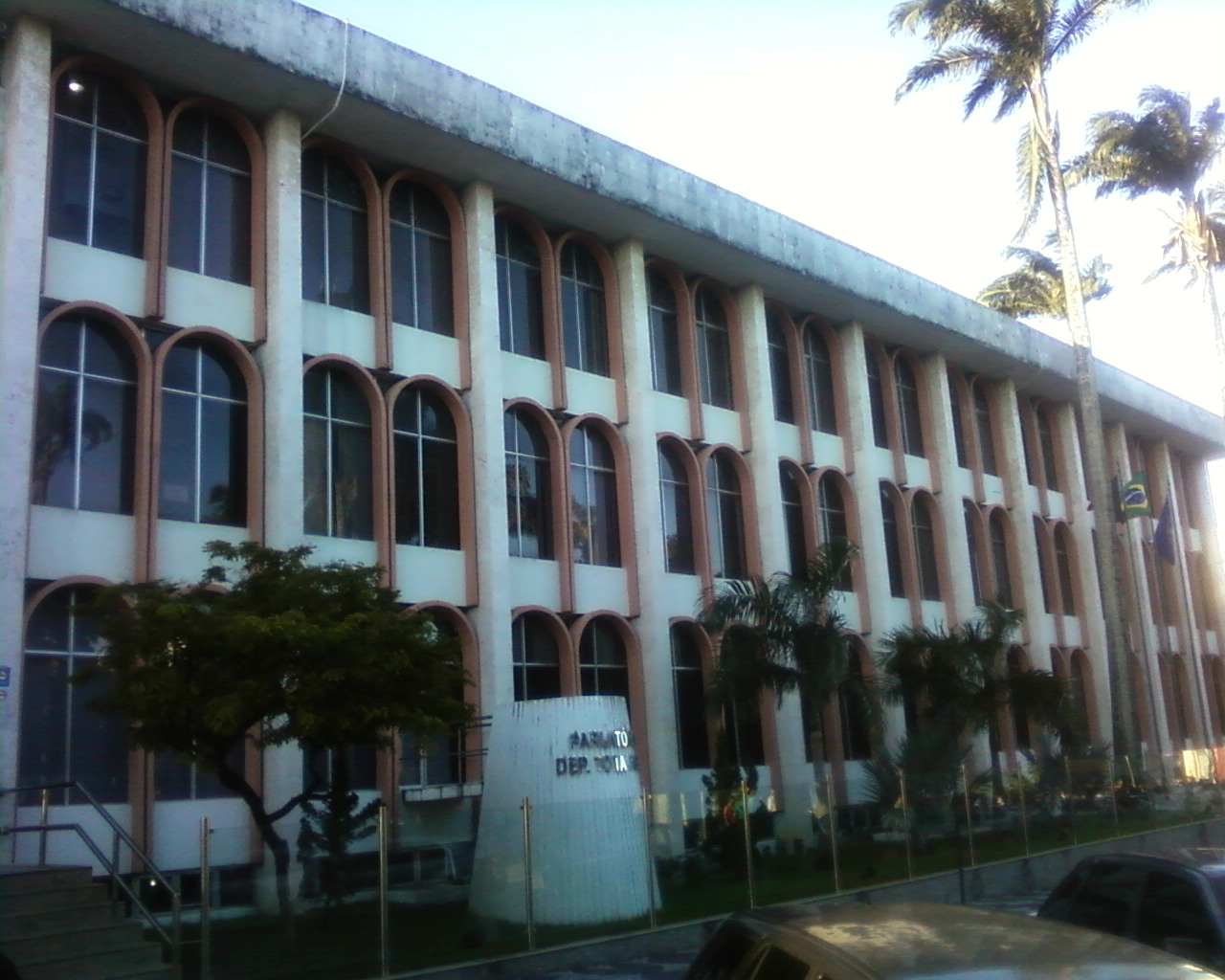
- Casa de Epitácio Pessoa, João Pessoa

Website
- www.al.pb.gov.br

The Legislative Assembly of Paraíba (Portuguese: Assembleia Legislativa da Paraíba) is the unicameral legislature of Paraíba state in Brazil. It has 36 state deputies elected by proportional representation.

The Provincial Assembly was founded on April 7, 1835, and during the Imperial Period featured 27 legislatures lasting two years, after the Proclamation of the Republic the Assembly became bicameral in 1892, the Assembly was closed between 1930 and 1934 returning after the Estado Novo became unicameral.
