= Captaincy of Paraíba =

1574-1822 Captaincy in Brazil

Captaincy of Paraíba Capitania da Paraiba
- 1574–1822
- Coat of arms

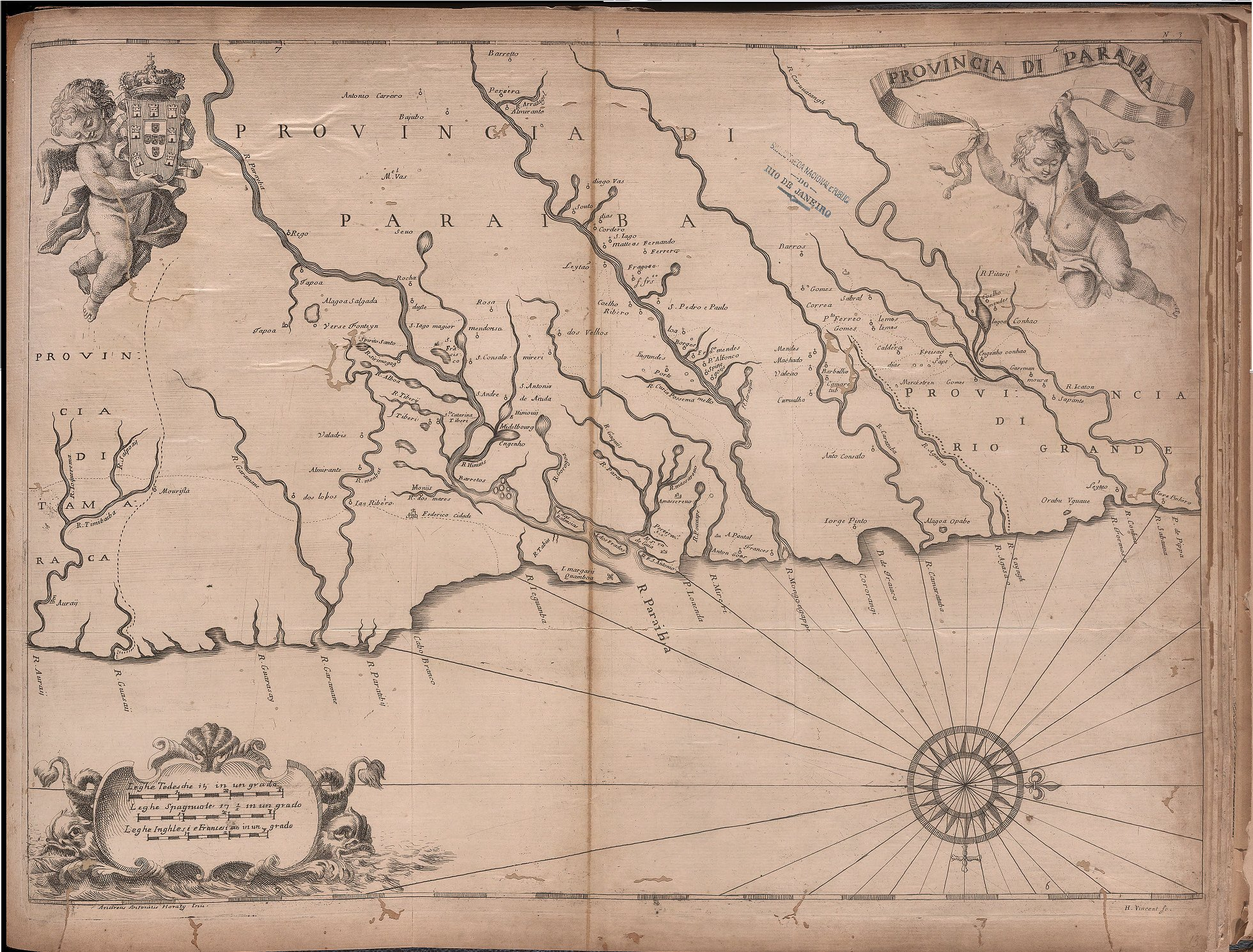
- Map Provincia di Paraiba, 1698, by the Italian cartographer Andreas Antonius Horatius
- Status: Dependent territory
- Capital: Cidade de Paraíba
- Official languages: Portuguese
- Religion: Catholicism

Government
  - First Governor 1582 –1585: Frutuoso Barbosa
- History
  - Established: 1574
  - Disestablished: 1822
- Today part of: Brazil

The Captaincy of Paraíba was a Portuguese Empire overseas captaincy in Brazil created in 1574. However, it was only conquered more than a decade later with the supposed extinction of the Captaincy of Itamaracá in the second half of the 18th century, since it was originally part of French America and its fiefdoms, such as Forte Velho and Baía da Traição. (Note: Although works such as Diálogos das Grandezas do Brasil (1618), by Ambrósio Fernandes Brandão, and Descrição Geral da capitania da Paraíba (1639), by the Dutchman Elias Herckmans, along with maps of the time, already mention the Captaincy of Paraíba, Itamaracá seems not to have been extinguished in the 16th century, but only after the Dutch period in the 17th century.)

== Overview ==
The original territory of Paraíba was larger than the current one: It extended to the Tordesilhas longitude, where today the state of Tocantins is located. In the period of the Treaty of Tordesillas, the Captaincy of Paraíba was, longitudinally, the most extensive geopolitical unit in Portuguese America, a title previously belonging to Itamaracá, which Paraíba was initially part of. Other captaincies of the northern coast invaded its original territory during the cattle raising expansion of the 17th century, as they did not have a large export economy, like Paraíba, and had to compensate for this by investing more in the extensive cattle raising economy. This generated trade between the sertão and the Zona da Mata, raising capital less directly. (Note: The captaincy stretched from Ponta do Seixas, in the far east of South America, to where the state of Tocantins is today.)

In the golden period of sugarcane culture in the Northeast, the Captaincy of Paraíba was among the three most economically successful regions in Portuguese America, alongside Pernambuco and Bahia.

== History ==
=== Precedents ===
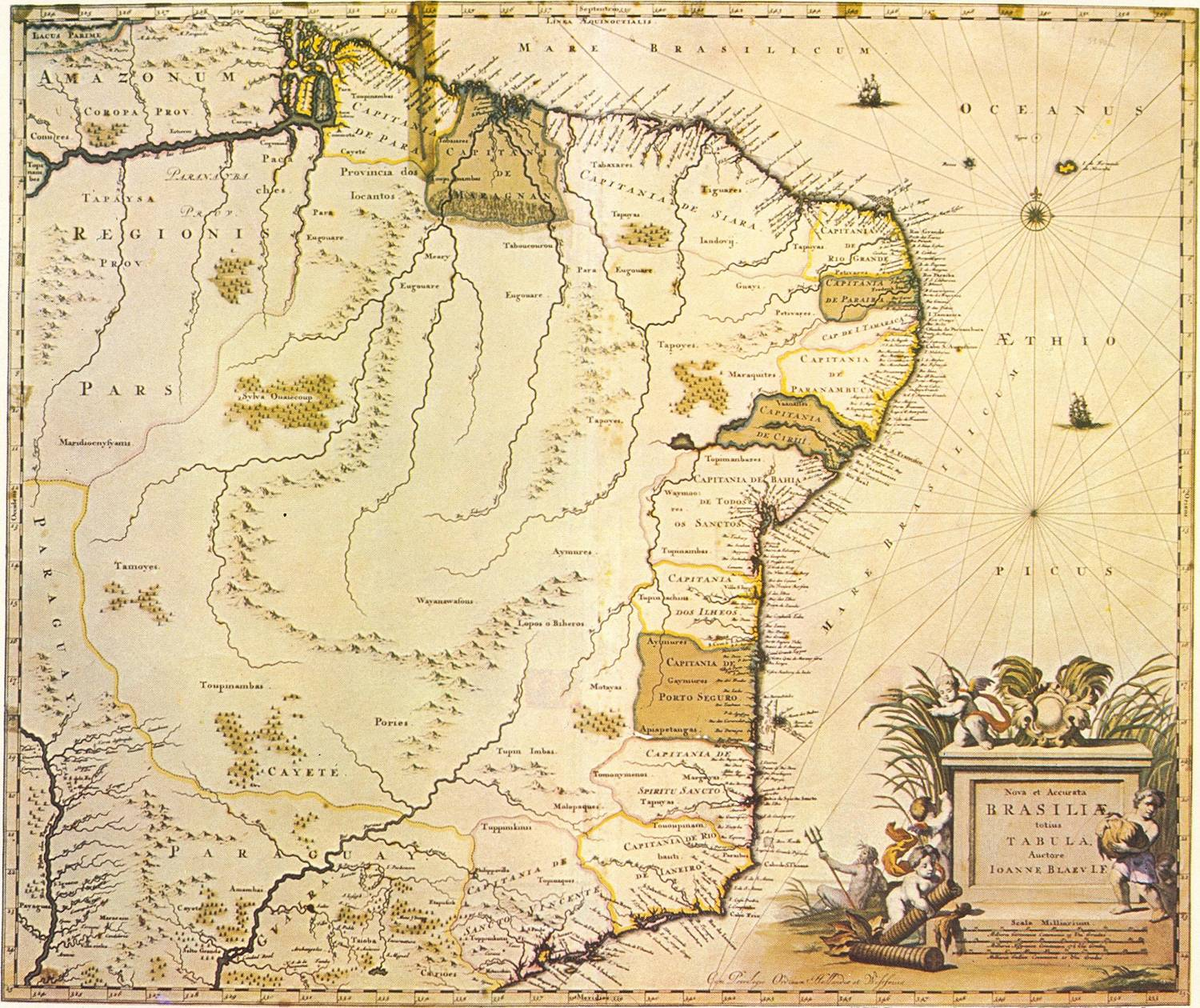
Joan Blaeu's map of 1640 with four captaincies highlighted, among them Paraíba.

Within the system of captaincies (1534), João de Barros and Aires da Cunha were granted one hundred leagues of land between the mouth of the Jaguaribe river in the north (current Ceará) and the Baía da Traição in the south (northern coast of Paraíba), the whole of Rio Grande do Norte and the eastern part of Ceará, since the south of Ceará was part of the western region of the Captaincy of Itamaracá. The northern third of Paraíba's territory was thus included in that of the then Captaincy of Rio Grande. With the shipwreck of the expedition of these donatários, which was headed for the first lot, it was not possible to colonize any of the lordships.

The Captaincy of Itamaracá was extinguished by Portuguese law in 1574, after a revolt articulated by French brazilwood smugglers against the bellicose Potiguaras on the banks of the Paraíba River, thus destroying Diogo Dias's Tracunhaém mill.

To subdue the rebellion, at the beginning of the following year, an expedition was sent from the Captaincy of Pernambuco under the command of Fernão da Silva, general ombudsman, and Royal Treasury Provider, without success. Luís de Brito e Almeida (1573-1578), failed to reach Paraíba, due to a storm that dispersed the vessels, forcing them to return to Pernambuco. A third expedition was planned by the government of the Captaincy of Pernambuco, departing from Olinda under the command of João Tavares (1579), once again with limited success.

The French alliance with the Potiguaras was solid, even after Tracunhaém, and would only change with the Iberian Union starting in the 1580s.

=== Founding of the captaincy ===
Eventually, Governor-General Manuel Teles Barreto (1583-1587) requested the help of Admiral D. Diogo Flores de Valdés' fleet, which at the time was patrolling the South American coast. He joined forces with the Captain-Major of the Paraíba captaincy, Frutuoso Barbosa, and organized a new expedition (1584), which founded the first Royal City in Brazil under the Philippine Dynasty: "Filipeia de Nossa Senhora das Neves".

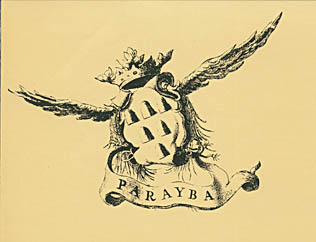
Coat of Arms of the Captaincy of Paraíba

Martim Leitão, the chief observer, with the help of the forces of the chief Pirajibe, subdued the Potiguaras from the south (at that time the Potiguara population was concentrated further north, in the region of today's Baía da Traição), erecting a new fort and definitively founding the population core of Nossa Senhora das Neves on August 5, 1585, future city of Parahyba, today João Pessoa. Thus, the captaincy was officially established. The definitive peace with the Potiguaras, then allied with the English, the Bretons, and the Normans (the latter two peoples from present-day France), was only achieved in 1599, after an epidemic of smallpox (which until then did not exist in the Americas) decimated the native population without immunity to such viruses.

In the context of the second Dutch Invasion of Brazil (1630-1654), the region of the captaincy was occupied by Dutch forces in 1634, which were only expelled two decades later by the troops of the master of field André Vidal de Negreiros (1606-1680) and João Fernandes Vieira, who took over as governor of the city.

=== Name ===
The river Paraíba lost its name São Domingos without official explanation and was renamed with the Tupi term Parahyba, which is how the natives already knew it before the European set foot on the territory. Its meaning ("bad river") is unclear and possibly refers to its limited navigability for boats with a draught greater than that of native canoes, or even to its brackish waters. The discarding of the name São Domingos may have been an adaptation of the French Saint-Domingue, as the mouth of the river was officially known by Europeans until then, who believed it to be a bay, calling it Bay de Saint-Domingue. This name appears on the first map of the region, from 1579.

=== Annexation and expansion ===
From 1753 onwards, the captaincy of Paraíba, like Ceará, was subordinated to the general Captaincy of Pernambuco, from which it again became independent in 1799. Regarding this annexation, the following account is in the Revista do Instituto Arqueológico, Histórico e Geográfico Pernambucano, from 1919:

Most of Paraíba is comprised in the territory of the former captaincy of Itamaracá, which was incorporated into that of Pernambuco after the expulsion of the Dutch in the 17th century, until it was emancipated on January 17, 1799.

The interiorization of the Captaincy of Paraíba was due to the expansion of cattle and the establishment of religious missions for the catechism of the natives, and at the beginning of the European colonization, the villages of São Miguel de Baía da Traição, Monte-Mor da Preguiça, Pilar, Conde (Jacoca), Freguesia do Cariri, Alhandra, and the city of Paraíba were formed. Later, during the Marquis of Pombal period, the indigenous population was transferred to the new vilas, especially in the 1760s.

== Geopolitical importance ==
The founding of the city that is now João Pessoa ensured the security of the wealthiest captaincy at the time (Pernambuco), as the Portuguese-Pernambucans presented to the French and Potiguaras the same threat as the Portuguese.

The Paraíba captaincy in French and native hands made the Portuguese uneasy, as they could at any time repeat the massacre in Tracunhaém, advancing further south and reaching Olinda, one of the main Portuguese civilization centers in colonial Brazil, thus compromising the export of the main commodity of the Portuguese Empire, sugar. At the time, São Vicente was the only captaincy in the southern part of Brazil with economic weight, while in the northern part there were several with a significant volume of exports, such as Itamaracá, Paraíba, Pernambuco, Bahia, and Rio Grande do Norte.

The French defeat in the Northeast was the hardest blow in the entire history of French America, as the loss of the Forte Velho trading post and, decades later, of São Luís (Maranhão) would set the precedent for the entire northeastern Brazilian coast, as well as the Amazon, to fall definitively into Iberian hands, pushing the French into the north of the South American continent (the Guianas and the Caribbean region).

== Chronology ==
Detail from the Terra Brasilis map, from 1519. The brazilwood represented along the coast of the Atlantic Forest.

=== 15th century ===
- Paraíba was inhabited by forest tribes (Tupis and Kiriri) who still had a Paleolithic lifestyle.
- Possible visit in 1499 of Spanish navigator Vicente Yáñez Pinzón to the region where João Pessoa is today, months before Cabral discovered Brazil. What is known is that he passed offshore, heading towards the Antilles.

=== 16th century ===
- Possible visit of Amerigo Vespucci to Paraíba in 1501.
- Frequent visits by French and English privateers to the captaincy, who bartered with the Potiguara natives and established a main trading post at Forte Velho and another at Baía da Traição, where a confederation of natives and French defeated the Portuguese in an ambush that gave the name "Baía da Traição" ("Bay of Treason") to the location.
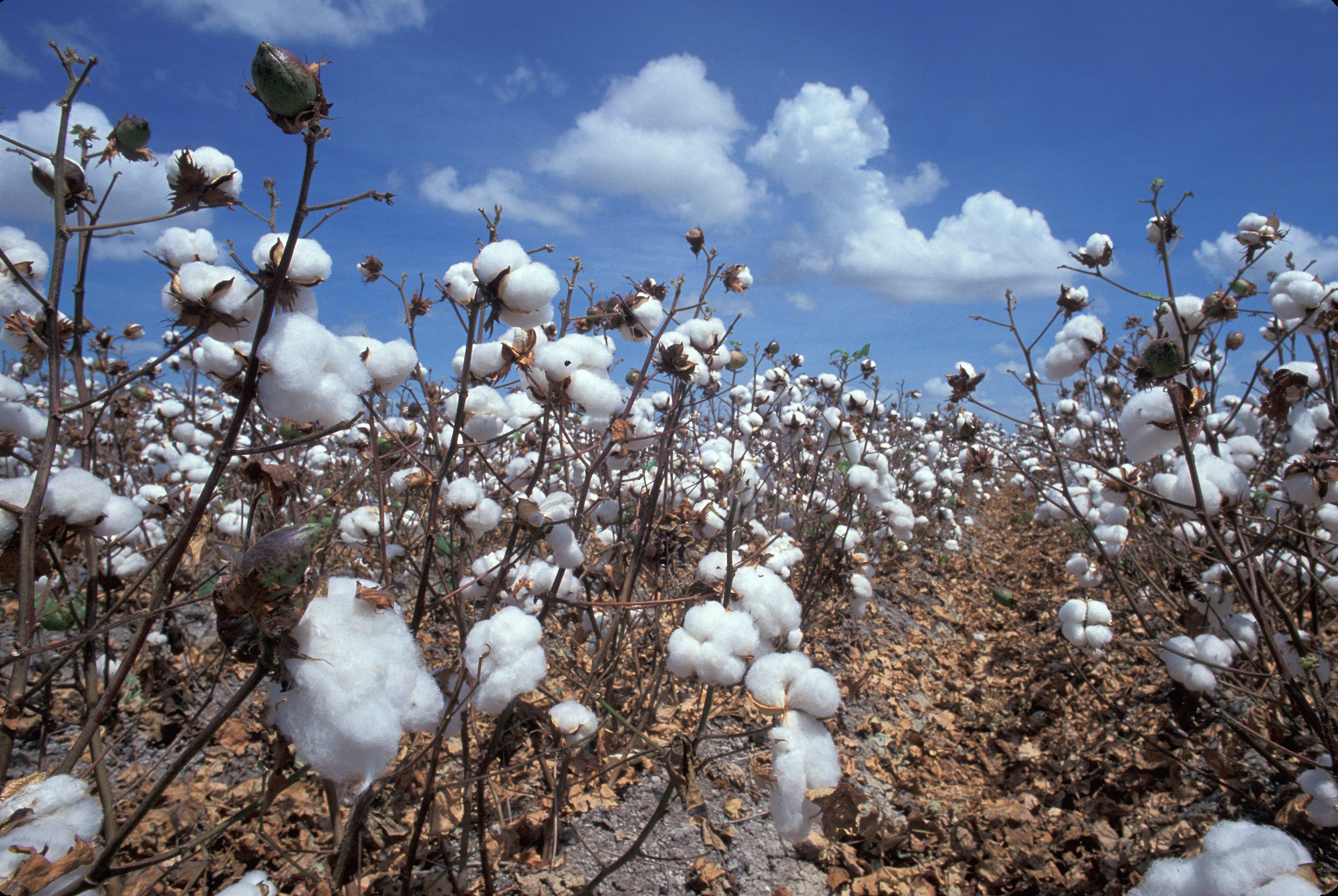
  Cotton was of vital importance in the economy of Paraíba.
- Royal captaincy with the first city founded under Spanish rule in Portuguese America: Filipeia de Nossa Senhora das Neves.

=== 17th century ===
- Dutch military-economic control.
- Apogee of sugar production in the eastern region and cattle breeding in the central-western part of the Captaincy of Paraíba. André Vidal de Negreiros, born in the captaincy, is one of the fiercest leaders against Dutch rule. At that time, Paraíba was known to the Hanseatic League for having "the best sugar bread in the Americas."
- It was not until almost two centuries after the Portuguese came to the Americas that their direct control over the territory would be consolidated.

=== 18th century ===
- Paraibans and other migrants from the Northeast and Portugal, called emboabas, have victory against the Paulistan bandeirantes in Minas Gerais.

=== 19th century ===
- Decay of the sugar culture and cattle breeding and the rise of the cotton cycle, mainly due to the American Civil War. With the decay of cotton and the rise of the rubber cycle, Paraíba begins to have a demographic decrease in comparison to other regions.

== See also ==
- Captaincies of Brazil
- Dutch colonization of the Americas
- History of Paraíba
