= Captaincy of Rio Grande =

Former territorial division of Brazil (1534–1821)

Captaincy of Rio Grande Capitania do Rio Grande
- 1534–1821
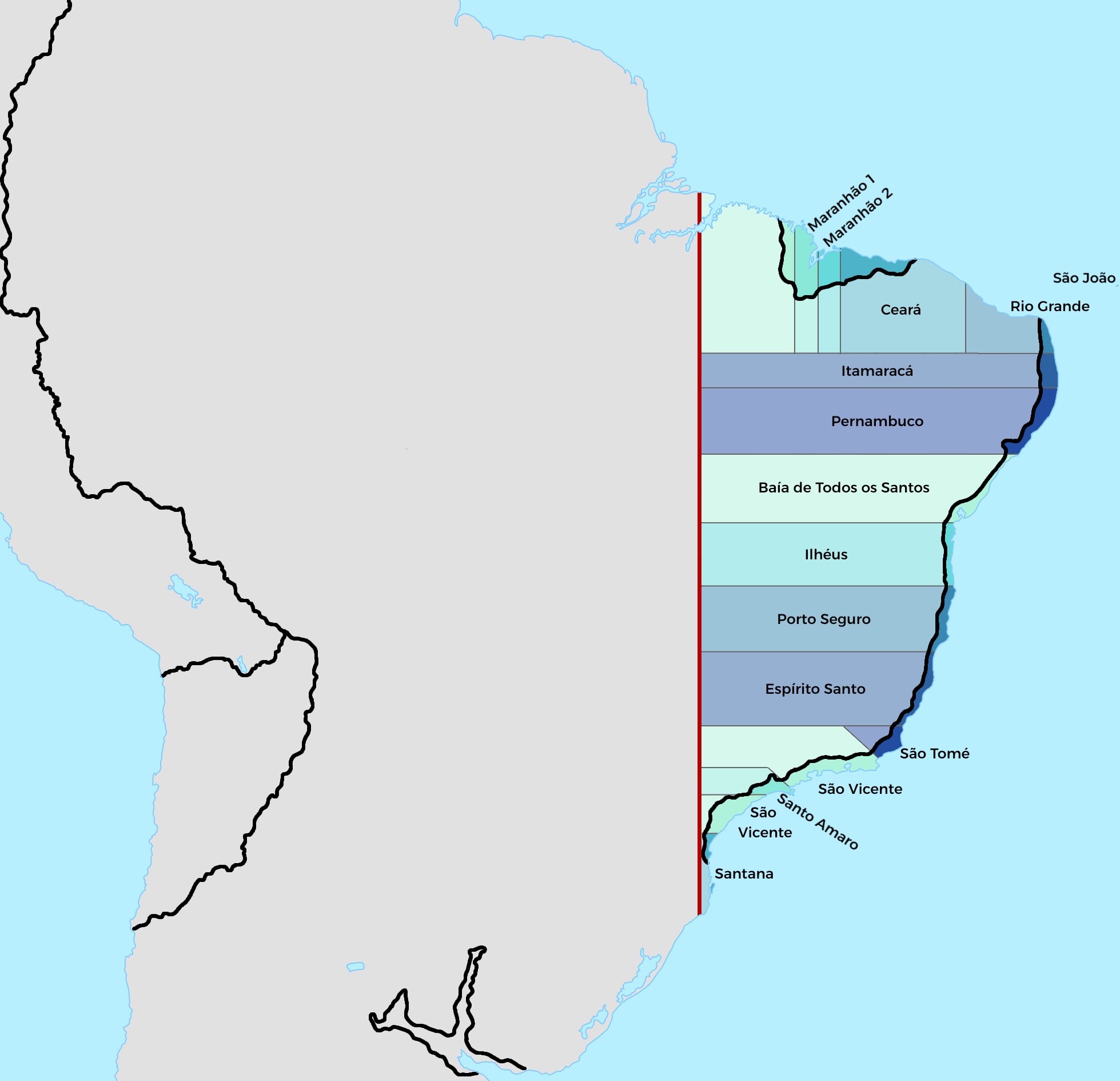
- Map of Brazil in 1534
- Status: Dependent territory
- Official languages: Portuguese
- Religion: Catholicism
- Today part of: Brazil

The Captaincy of Rio Grande (Portuguese: Capitania do Rio Grande) was one of the administrative subdivisions of Brazilian territory during the colonial period of Portuguese America. It was created in 1534 along with thirteen other hereditary captaincies and granted by John III, King of Portugal, to the so-called donatários. Initially, it was administered by João de Barros, a Portuguese historian, and Aires da Cunha.

Its territory was located between the mouth of the Jaguaribe river (to the north) and the bay of Traição (to the south), bordering the Captaincy of Itamaracá. It encompassed lands in the current states of Rio Grande do Norte, Ceará and Paraíba. Pernambuco and São Vicente were the only captaincies that prospered in the colonial period.

== History ==
=== Background ===
European colonization in America effectively began in 1534, when King John III divided the territory into fourteen hereditary captaincies and gave them to twelve donatários, who could exploit the land's resources, but in exchange had to populate and protect the regions. Since the 15th century, the system of captaincies had been used by the Portuguese Empire on the islands of Madeira and Cape Verde. In a letter addressed to Martim Afonso de Sousa in 1532, John III announced the decision to divide the Portuguese territory, beginning the donations in 1534.

There are three possible factors for the adoption of the captaincy system in Brazil: a response by the Portuguese monarchy to France's threat to its project of domination in America; the transfer of expenses with colonization from Portugal to the donatários, favoring the Crown in a situation of limited resources; and the conversion of the native population to Christianity, continuing the ideal of the Crusades.

=== Origins ===
The Captaincy of Rio Grande was the second plot given to João de Barros and Aires da Cunha. They arrived in 1535 to occupy the land, accompanied by Fernão Álvares de Andrade. As both of their efforts were directed towards the first plot (the Captaincy of Maranhão), due to the difficulties encountered there in 1535, the second plot remained abandoned.

The French presence on the coast of the captaincy, together with the local indigenous groups, obstructed Portuguese development in the region. In 1597, under the command of Francisco de Souza, a Lusitanian nobleman and then Governor General of Brazil, after two failed colonization efforts, the third attempt to colonize the lands occurred, which was consolidated in 1598 with the creation of the Fort of Reis Magos and, in 1599, of the city of Natal.

At the end of the 16th century, during the Philippine Dynasty, in order to contain the threat of French brazilwood smugglers on the coast, Philip II of Spain ordered Captain Alexandre de Moura, with the help of Feliciano Coelho de Carvalho, Captain-Major of the Captaincy of Paraíba, to head for Rio Grande, to establish a colony and a fort, and to fight the French, who were associated there with the Potiguara people.

The mouth of the Potenji River was reached on December 25, 1597, by the Captain-Major of the Captaincy of Pernambuco, Manuel Mascarenhas Homem, who built the first defensive nucleus there - the base of the Fortress of Barra do Rio Grande. Feliciano Coelho de Carvalho joined him in April 1598, and in June they both returned to Pernambuco, leaving Jerônimo de Albuquerque Maranhão in charge of the emerging fortress and settlement. On December 25, 1598, the Mother Church was inaugurated in the village founded about three kilometers from the bar, which was called Natal.

The Fort of Reis Magos was conquered in 1633 and occupied by the Dutch until the end of their invasion of Brazil. From 1701, the Captaincy of Rio Grande was subordinated to the Captaincy of Pernambuco.

On October 7, 1807, the Portuguese Crown asked the governor of Rio Grande do Norte, Lieutenant Colonel José Francisco de Paula Cavalcanti de Albuquerque, to provide information on the necessary measures for the defense of the captaincy. The reply, in a detailed report, led to the construction of several fortifications, built in 1808, simultaneously with the arrival of the Portuguese Royal Family in Brazil during the Peninsular War.

When Brazil was elevated to the United Kingdom of Portugal, Brazil and the Algarves, the captaincy became a province. It became involved in the Pernambuco Revolution of 1817, and a provisional government was installed in Natal. In 1889, with the Proclamation of the Brazilian Republic, it became a state.

== Territory ==
Although it was originally one of the largest captaincies in Brazil, the territory of Rio Grande suffered many losses. To the west, the Captaincy of Ceará expanded southwards through cattle ranching, taking over a large area of Rio Grande do Norte. The annexation of the southeast of Itamaracá by Pernambuco affected the captaincy, since part of the southeast of Rio Grande do Norte was taken away in order to compensate territorially for the newly created Captaincy of Paraíba.

== See also ==
- History of Rio Grande do Norte
- Captaincy of Maranhão
- History of Brazil
