= Restinga de Cabedelo National Forest =

Brazilian national forest

- Floresta Nacional da Restinga de Cabedelo
- IUCN category VI (protected area with sustainable use of natural resources)
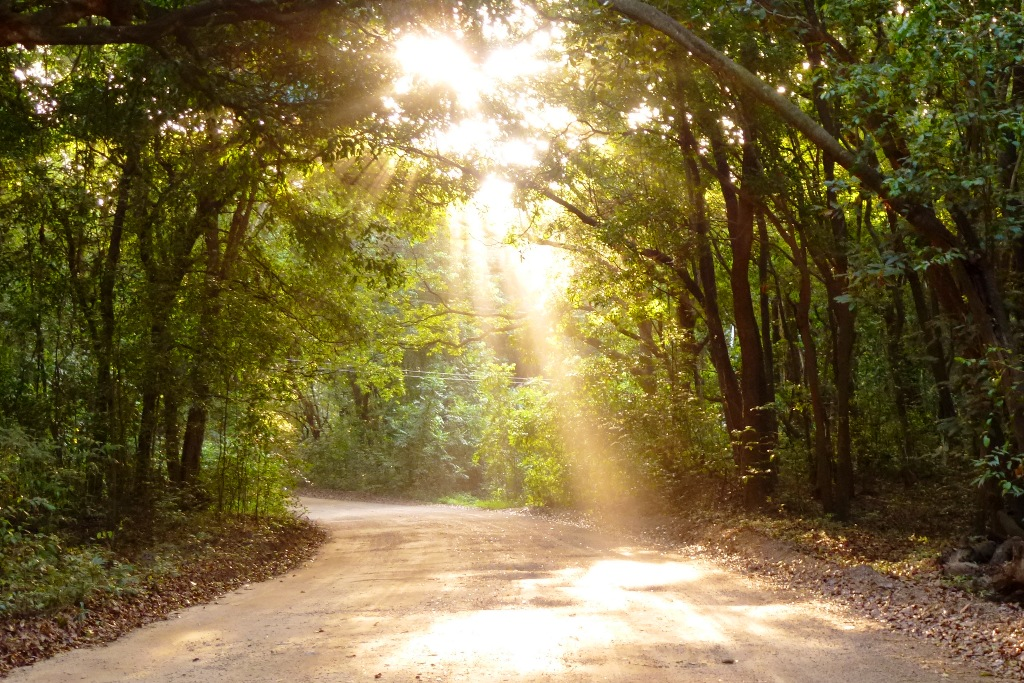
- Access road to the forest

- Location within Brazil
- Nearest city: Cabedelo, Paraíba
- Coordinates: 7°03′51″S 34°51′19″W
- Area: 114.34 ha (282.5 acres)
- Designation: National forest
- Created: 2 June 2004
- Administrator: ICMBio

The Restinga de Cabedelo National Forest (Portuguese: Floresta Nacional da Restinga de Cabedelo) is a national forest in the state of Paraíba, Brazil.

== Location ==
The Restinga de Cabedelo National Forest is divided between the municipalities of Cabedelo (79%) and João Pessoa (215) in the state of Paraíba. It has an area of 114.34 hectares (282.5 acres). (Note: The act of creation gave an area of 103 hectares (250 acres). The management plan gives an area of 114.34 hectares (282.5 acres). According to the ICMBio website as of March 2017 it has an area of 116.83 hectares (288.7 acres).) It is in the João Pessoa metropolitan region. The conservation unit is popularly called the AMEM Forest. It is administered by the federal Chico Mendes Institute for Biodiversity Conservation (ICMBio).

== History ==
The Restinga de Cabedelo National Forest was created by federal decree on 2 June 2004 with an area of 103 hectares (250 acres). It is classed as IUCN protected area category VI (protected area with sustainable use of natural resources). The purpose is sustainable use of forest resources, and scientific research with emphasis on methods for sustainable exploitation of native forests. By ordinance 11 of 16 March 2009 the president of ICMBio created the consultative council, with the goal of helping to create and implement the management plan. The management plan was approved by ordinance 76 of 13 February 2017.

== Environment ==
The Restinga de Cabedelo National Forest holds one of the last fragments of Atlantic Forest restinga vegetation in Paraíba. Vegetation includes Atlantic forest with areas of mangrove, restinga fields and restinga forest.

== Public use ==
In 2000 it was reported that the people of the adjoining Renascer bairro often used the forest for fruit, firewood, herbs and plants for food and medicine. 32 research projects were authorized between 2008 and 2013. Due to low staff levels, the forest has not been used for educational purposes. There are no facilities for visitors such as a visitor center, shops and cafeteria. There is an auditorium for 50 people, accessible bathrooms and covered parking.

Problems include illegal fishing, practice of religious rituals, drug use, theft and other crimes. Conflicting uses include the AMEM shelter for the elderly, wild animal screening center, and the highway, railway, gas pipeline and electrical power lines that adjoins or cross the forest.

== Sources ==
- Flona da Restinga de Cabedelo (in Portuguese), ICMBio
- FLONA da Restinga de Cabedelo (in Portuguese), ISA: Instituto Socioambiental
- Flona de Cabedelo (in Portuguese), ICMBio: Chico Mendes Institute for Biodiversity Conservation
- Goncalves, Augusta Rosa; Fernandes, Carlos Henrique Velasquez (December 2016), Plano de Manejo da Floresta Nacional da Restinga de Cabedelo (PDF) (in Portuguese), Cabedelo: ICMBio
- Unidade de Conservação: Floresta Nacional da Restinga de Cabedelo (in Portuguese), MMA: Ministério do Meio Ambiente
