= Alhandra =

Alhandra may refer to:

== People ==
- Alhandra (footballer) (born 1979), Portuguese retired footballer

== Places ==
- Alhandra, Paraíba, Brazil; municipality in the state of Paraíba
- Alhandra, São João dos Montes e Calhandriz (Alhandra, São João dos Montes and Calhandriz), civil parish in Portugal formed in 2013 as a merger of those three
  - Alhandra, Portugal, former parish that has since been merged
