= Captaincy of Itamaracá =

Former territorial division of Brazil (1534–1763)

Captaincy of Itamaracá Capitania de Itamaracá
- 1534–1763
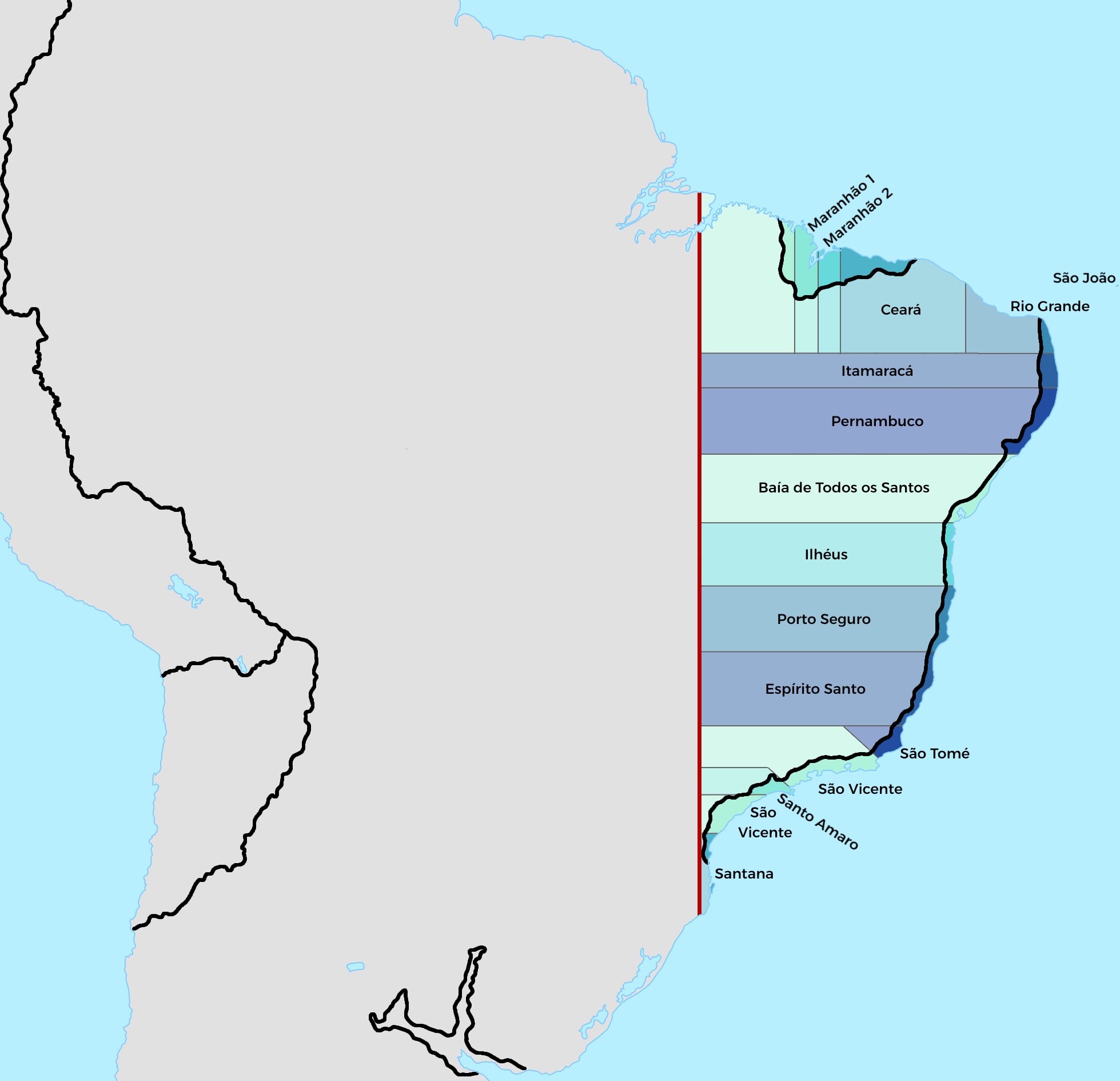
- Map of Brazil in 1534
- Official languages: Portuguese
- Religion: Catholicism
- Government: Absolute monarchy
  - First donatário: Pero Lopes de Sousa
- Today part of: Brazil

The Captaincy of Itamaracá (Portuguese: Capitania de Itamaracá) was one of the administrative subdivisions of Brazilian territory during the colonial period of Portuguese America. It was created in 1534 along with thirteen other hereditary captaincies and granted by John III, King of Portugal, to the so-called donatários. After being established, it was donated to Pero Lopes de Sousa.

It had two capitals, Itamaracá and Goiana, and was originally the longest Portuguese overseas territory, stretching from the eastern end of the American mainland to Tordesillas, with Baía da Traição (Paraíba) as its northern limit and Igarassu (Pernambuco) as its southern limit. The captaincy had six parishes, including three towns: Taquara, Alhandra, Goiana, També, Tejucupapo and Itamaracá.

== History ==
=== Background ===
European colonization in America effectively began in 1534, when King John III divided the territory into fourteen hereditary captaincies and gave them to twelve donatários, who could exploit the land's resources, but in exchange had to populate and protect the regions. Since the 15th century, the system of captaincies had been used by the Portuguese Empire on the islands of Madeira and Cape Verde. In a letter addressed to Martim Afonso de Sousa in 1532, John III announced the decision to divide the Portuguese territory, beginning the donations in 1534.

There are three possible factors for the adoption of the captaincy system in Brazil: a response by the Portuguese monarchy to France's threat to its project of domination in America; the transfer of expenses with colonization from Portugal to the donatários, favoring the Crown in a situation of limited resources; and the conversion of the native population to Christianity, continuing the ideal of the Crusades.

=== Origins ===
Pero Lopes de Sousa put Francisco de Braga in charge of the captaincy, who occupied the island of Conceição and founded the village of Marial or Nossa Senhora da Conceição in 1534. Meanwhile, the mainland was home to the Potiguara indigenous people, who resisted the colonizers, and the French, who trafficked in brazilwood. In a mercantilist relationship, they allied themselves, while the Portuguese posed the threat of slavery. There were frequent attacks on the Portuguese inhabitants in the region and on the Captaincy of Olinda, owned by Duarte Coelho.

In 1539, Pero Lopes died and the land returned to the possession of the Crown, turning Itamaracá into a royal captaincy. However, the Potiguara' domination of the territory was a threat to the security of the Portuguese colonizers. In 1540, João Gonçalves was appointed royal administrator, but he didn't arrive until 1548. The end of the Captaincy of Itamaracá was triggered by the event known as the Tragedy of Tracunhaém.

In 1574, Itamaracá lost part of its territory after the creation of the Captaincy of Paraíba, which would only be installed in 1585 with the necessary resources to prevent further French invasions, repel attacks by the Tabajara and Potiguara peoples and ensure the conquest of the north of northeastern Brazil. During Dutch rule, chronicler Elias Erckmann described Itamaracá as a province of New Holland located between Paraíba and Pernambuco. In 1763, with the death of its last donatário, the Captaincy of Itamaracá was officially extinguished and annexed to Pernambuco, whose original seat was Olinda.

== Main towns ==
- Goiana: Located on the border with Paraíba, it was able to prosper more due to its greater distance from Olinda, which tended to attract more settlers and investments;
- Igarassu: Located on the border with Pernambuco, flourished precisely because of its proximity to Olinda;
- Conceição: It was the first name for the island's headquarters and the coastal geographical landmark that gave its name to the entire captaincy. It represented an initial moment in the occupation of the captaincy, when the settlers were still afraid to enter the mainland.

== See also ==
- History of Pernambuco
- History of Brazil
