= Forte de Santa Catarina =

- Cabedelo, Paraíba in Brazil
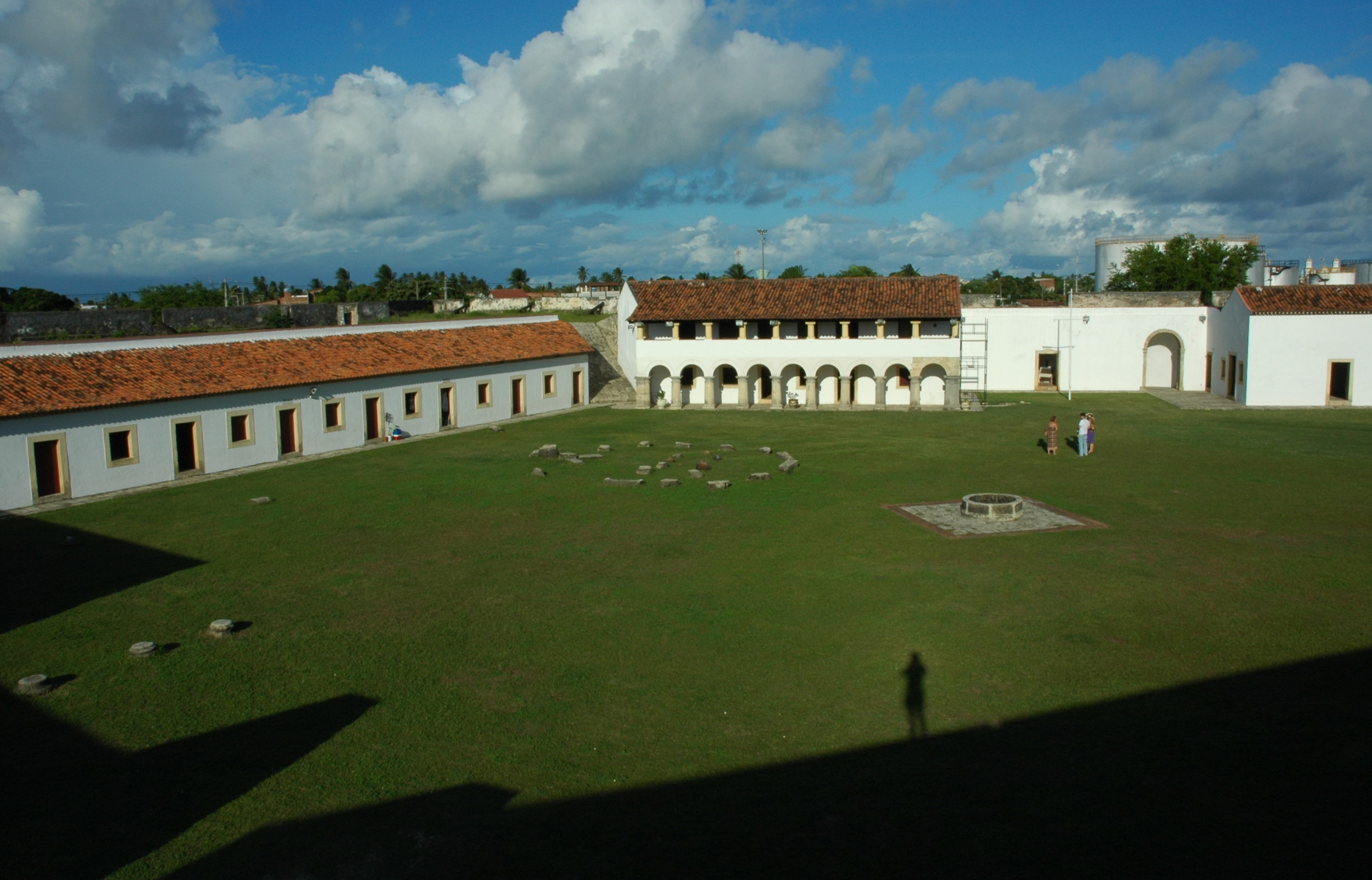

Site information
- Type: Fort

Location
- Location of Forte de Santa Catarina in Brazil
- Coordinates: 6.968708°S 34.839968°W

Forte de Santa Catarina is a fort located in Cabedelo, Paraíba in Brazil.

The fort was initially built in 1585 by the german Cristóvão Linz, under orders of Capitão-Mor (captain-major) of the Captaincy of Paraíba, Frutuoso Barbosa.

In August 13, 1597, the fort was burnt by a combined force of French and Potiguara soldiers, as retaliation for French losses elsewhere in the Brazilian northeast.

The fortress would be rebuilt, and during the Dutch invasions of Brazil it would be a central place in the Battle of Cabedelo. In early December 1631, sixteen hundred dutch soldiers landed in Praia Formosa in Cabedelo, and marched towards the Fort of Santa Catarina, being beaten back on the 12th. The fortress would resist continuous attacks until in 1634, being renamed by Maurice of Nassauto Fort Margarida.

== See also ==
- Military history of Brazil
