= Conde, Paraíba =

Coordinates: 7°15′36″S 34°54′28″W

- Municipality
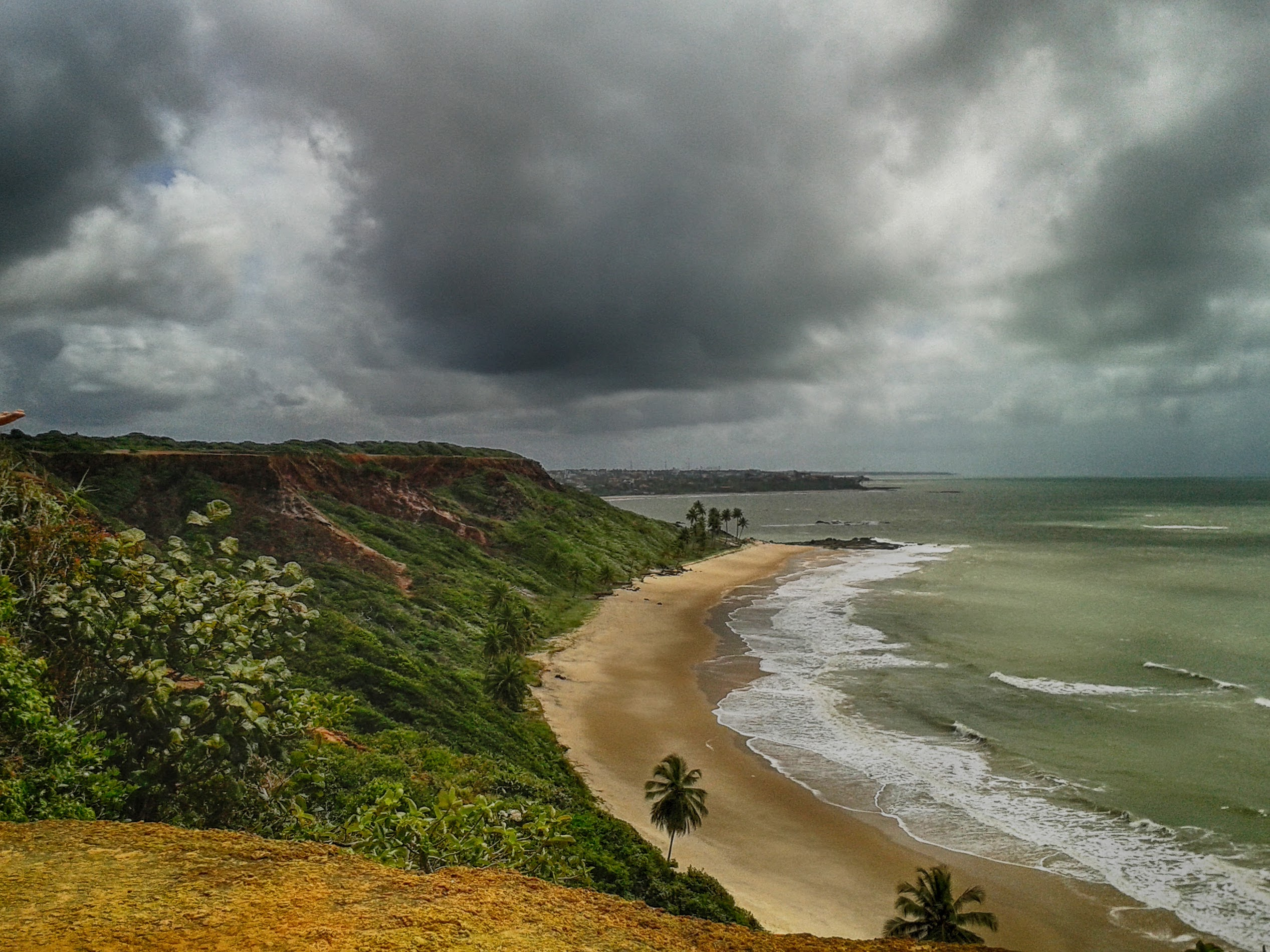
- Coqueirinho beach

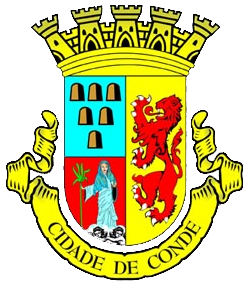
- Flag Coat of arms
- Interactive map of Conde, Paraíba
- Country: Brazil
- Region: Northeast
- State: Paraíba
- Mesoregion: Mata Paraibana

Population (2020)
  - Total: 25,010
- Time zone: UTC−3 (BRT)

Conde, Paraíba is a municipality in the state of Paraíba in the Northeast Region of Brazil.

== See also ==
- List of municipalities in Paraíba
