= Cabedelo =

- Municipality
- Município de Cabedelo
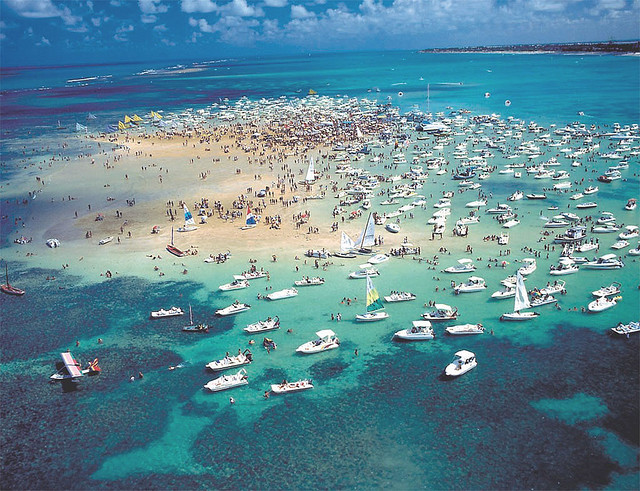
- Areia Vermelha

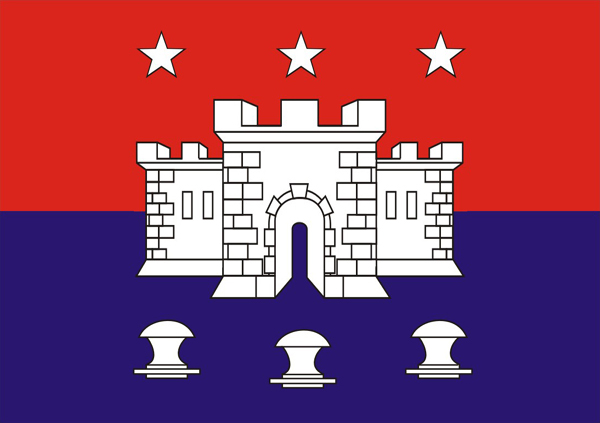
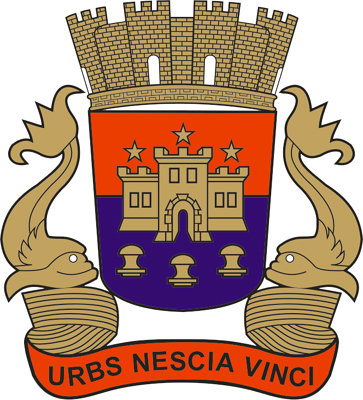
- Flag Coat of arms
- Motto: VRBS NESCIA VINCI
- Location of Cabedelo in the state of Paraíba

- Location of Cabedelo in Brazil
- Coordinates: 06°58′51″S 34°50′02″W
- Country: Brazil
- Region: Northeast
- State: Paraíba

Government
  - Prefeito: Vitor Hugo (DEM)

Area
  - Total: 31.915 km^{2} (12.322 sq mi)
- Elevation: 3 m (9.8 ft)

Population (2020)
  - Total: 68,767
- Time zone: UTC−3 (BRT)

Cabedelo is a municipality of the Metropolitan Region of João Pessoa, in the state of Paraíba in the Northeast Region of Brazil.

It has an area of 29,873 square kilometers, with singular measures: 18 kilometers long and only three kilometers wide. Its population in 2020 was estimated by the Brazilian Institute of Geography and Statistics (IBGE) at 68,767 inhabitants. On 17th century Dutch maps, it appeared as an island because of the Jaguaribe and Mandacaru rivers. Its geophysical age also differs from neighbouring municipalities that tend to have older sedimentary plateaus and therefore divergent average altitude and climate.

Currently, it is troubled by the capital of Paraíba, João Pessoa, and serves as an extension of certain tertiary activities of the headquarters, such as tourism but also private higher education, etc. CBTU urban trains and Estrada de Cabedelo (BR-230) are the main connections between the two cities. It is the richest municipality in the state in terms of gross domestic product per capita, as it has a gross domestic product of more than 2.2 billion reais according to updated data from 2007, that is, more than half of the economy of Campina Grande (another large city in the state) in a much smaller area and with a much lower population. It has one of the largest proportional gross domestic products in the Northeast, comparable to cities like Ipojuca and Guamaré.

The municipality contains the 103-hectare (250-acre) Restinga de Cabedelo National Forest, created in 2004.

== History ==
Around 1000 years ago, the region where the municipality of Cabedelo is currently settled was the land of the Tapuian Indians, who migrated to the interior of the continent due to the arrival of Tupi tribes from the Amazon. In the 16th century, when the first Europeans arrived, the region constituted the border between the territories of the Tupi tribes of Potiguaras (which were located in the north) and Tabajaras (which were located in the south). The latter allied themselves with the Portuguese colonizers, while the former became staunch opponents of them.

Cabedelo was founded on November 4, 1585, around the Forte de Santa Catarina, a fortress built by the Portuguese in order to defend the entrance to the Paraíba River estuary and the city of Filipeia de Nossa Senhora das Neves, now known as João Pessoa. In 1597, french ships and a combined force of French and Potiguara soldiers burned the fort and razed the town.

During the Dutch invasions of Brazil, the battle of Cabedelo took place, where the city withstood Dutch attacks for three years until being finally conquered in 1634. At the time of Dutch domination, between 1634 and 1654, the city was renamed Margaretha (Margarida).

Cabedelo conquered and lost autonomy for the city of João Pessoa a few times. Through the Law 283, of March 17, 1908, Cabedelo obtained autonomy, which was elevated to the condition of a village. Later, the village lost the jurisdiction of town and municipality, by the State Law 676, of November 20, 1928, which annexed its territory to the municipality of the capital.

In an administrative division of 1933, it once again appeared as a district in the municipality of João Pessoa. With State Law 1 631, of December 12, 1956, Cabedelo once again returned to the category of municipality, consisting of a single district. That legal diploma created the district, by dismembering the capital. The installation of the new municipality was scheduled for April 4, 1959, however, it was installed on January 31, 1957.

== See also ==
- List of municipalities in Paraíba
- Brazilian cargo ship Cabedello
