= Pilar, Paraíba =

Coordinates: 7°16′01″S 35°15′36″W

- Municipality
- Flag Coat of arms
- Interactive map of Pilar, Paraíba
- Country: Brazil
- Region: Northeast
- State: Paraíba
- Mesoregion: Mata Paraibana

Population (2022. https://cidades.ibge.gov.br/brasil/pb/pilar/panorama)
  - Total: 12,311
- Time zone: UTC−3 (BRT)

Pilar, Paraíba is a municipality in the state of Paraíba in the Northeast Region of Brazil. It had a population of about 12,311 according to the 2022 census, and an estimated population of 12,801 in 2024.

== See also ==
- List of municipalities in Paraíba
