= Baía da Traição =

- Municipality
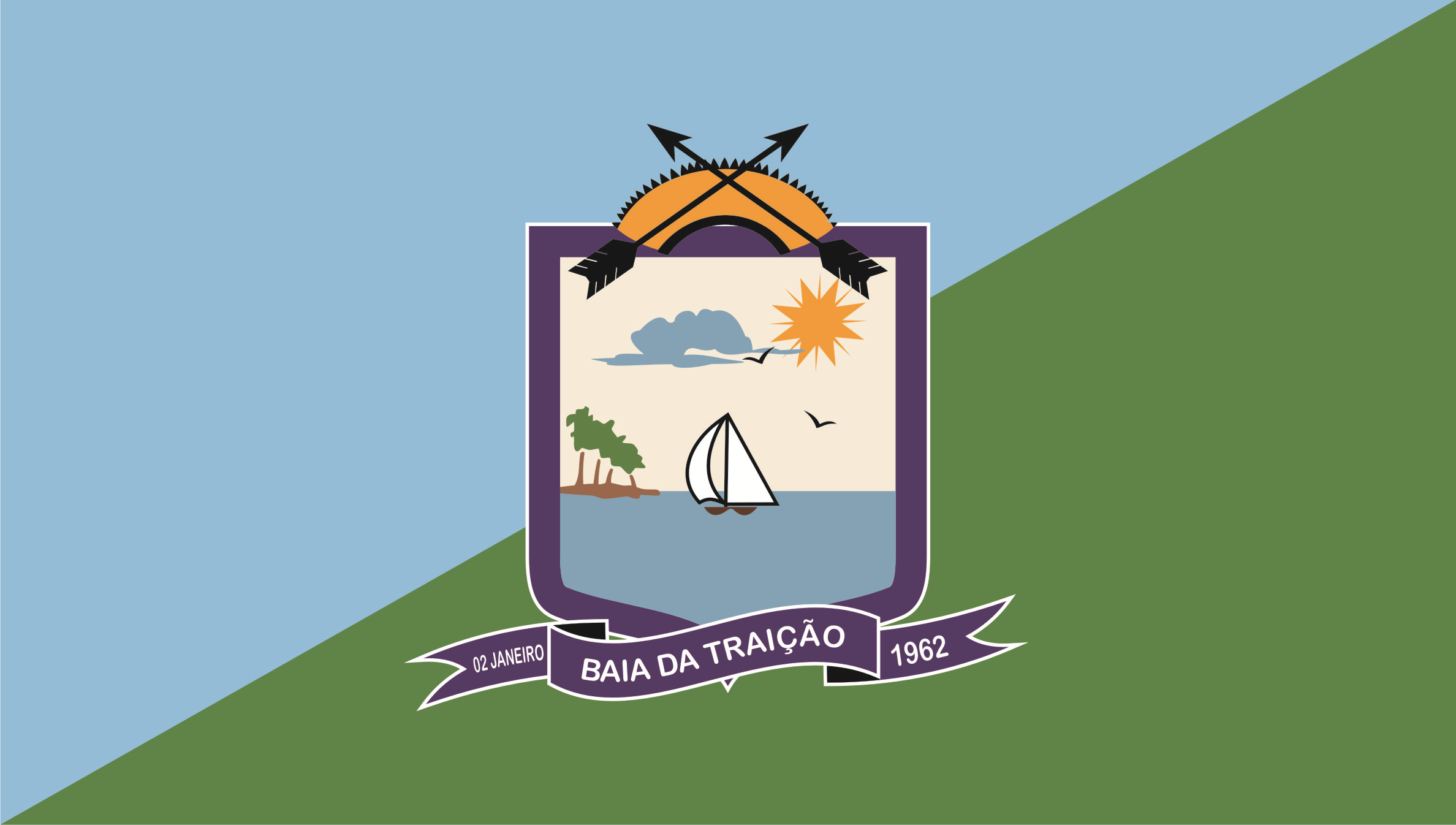
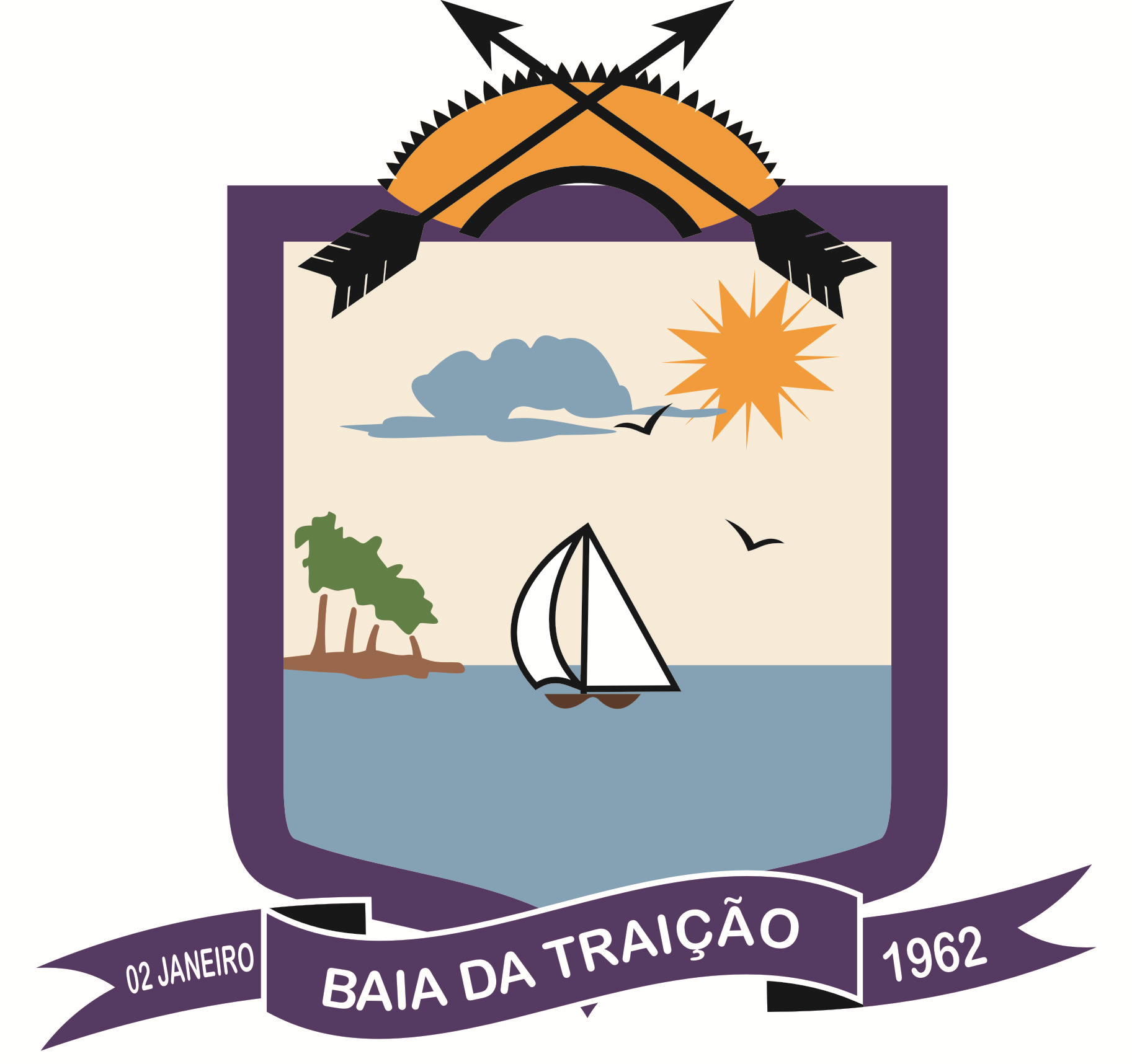
- Flag Coat of arms

- Location in Brazil
- Coordinates: 6°42′S 34°56′W
- Country: Brazil
- Region: South
- State: Paraíba
- Mesoregion: Mata Paraibana

Population (2020)
  - Total: 9,096
- Time zone: UTC−3 (BRT)

Baía da Traição is a municipality in the state of Paraíba in the Northeast Region of Brazil.

== See also ==
- List of municipalities in Paraíba
