= Alhandra, Paraíba =

Alhandra
- Municipality
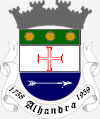
- Flag Coat of arms

- Coordinates: 7°26′20″S 34°54′50″W
- Country: Brazil
- Region: Northeast
- State: Paraíba
- Mesoregion: Mata Paraibana

Population (2020)
  - Total: 19,727
- Time zone: UTC−3 (BRT)

Alhandra is a municipality in the state of Paraíba in the Northeast Region of Brazil.

== See also ==
- List of municipalities in Paraíba
