= Paraíba =

State of Brazil

- State
- Flag Coat of arms
- Anthem: Hino da Paraíba
- Location in Brazil
- Coordinates: 7°10′S 36°50′W
- Country: Brazil
- Region: Northeast
- Capital and largest city: João Pessoa

Government
  - Type: Unitary state
  - Governor: Lucas Ribeiro (PP)
  - Vice Governor: Vacant
  - Senators: Daniella Ribeiro (PP); Efraim Filho (PL); Veneziano Vital (MDB)
  - Legislature: Legislative Assembly of Paraíba

Area
  - Total: 56,440 km^{2} (21,790 sq mi)
  - Rank: 21st

Population (2022)
  - Total: 3,974,687
  - Rank: 13th
  - Density: 70.42/km^{2} (182.4/sq mi)
  - Rank: 8th
- Demonym: Paraibano

GDP (2024)
  - Total: R$107.012 billion (US$19.858 billion)

HDI
  - Year: 2024
  - Category: 0.760 – high (21st)
- Time zone: UTC-3 (BRT)
- Postal Code: 58000-000 to 58990-000
- ISO 3166 code: BR-PB
- Website: paraiba.pb.gov.br

Paraíba (/ˌpɑːrəˈiːbə/ PAR-ə-EE-bə, Brazilian Portuguese: [paɾaˈibɐ]; Tupinambá: pa'ra a'íba) is a state in Brazil. It is located in the Brazilian Northeast, and it is bordered by Rio Grande do Norte to the north, Ceará to the west, Pernambuco to the south and the Atlantic Ocean to the east. Paraíba is the third most densely populated state of the Northeast; João Pessoa, the coastal state capital, and Campina Grande, in the countryside, rank among the fifteen largest municipalities in the Northeast of Brazil. The state is home to 1.9% of the Brazilian population and produces 0.9% of the Brazilian GDP and it is divided into 223 municipalities.

Paraíba is mostly populated along the Atlantic coast, which extends as far as Ponta do Seixas, the easternmost point of the mainland Americas. The state is a tourist and industrial hotspot; it is known for its cultural heritage, amenable climate and geographical features, ranging from the seaside beaches to the Borborema Plateau. It is named after the Paraíba river.

Notable writers and poets from Paraíba include Augusto dos Anjos, José Américo de Almeida, José Lins do Rego, Ariano Suassuna and Pedro Américo, the last being also known for his historical paintings.

== History ==
Before Europeans arrived in Brazil, the territory that is now the state of Paraíba was home to numerous indigenous tribes. Between the coast and the Borborema Plateau, the main indigenous group was the Potiguara (part of the larger Tupi group), who lived along the Paraíba do Norte river. The Kiriri and Ariús groups, meanwhile, lived further to the west, occupying the region between the Borborema Plateau and the sertão.

=== Colonization and conquest ===
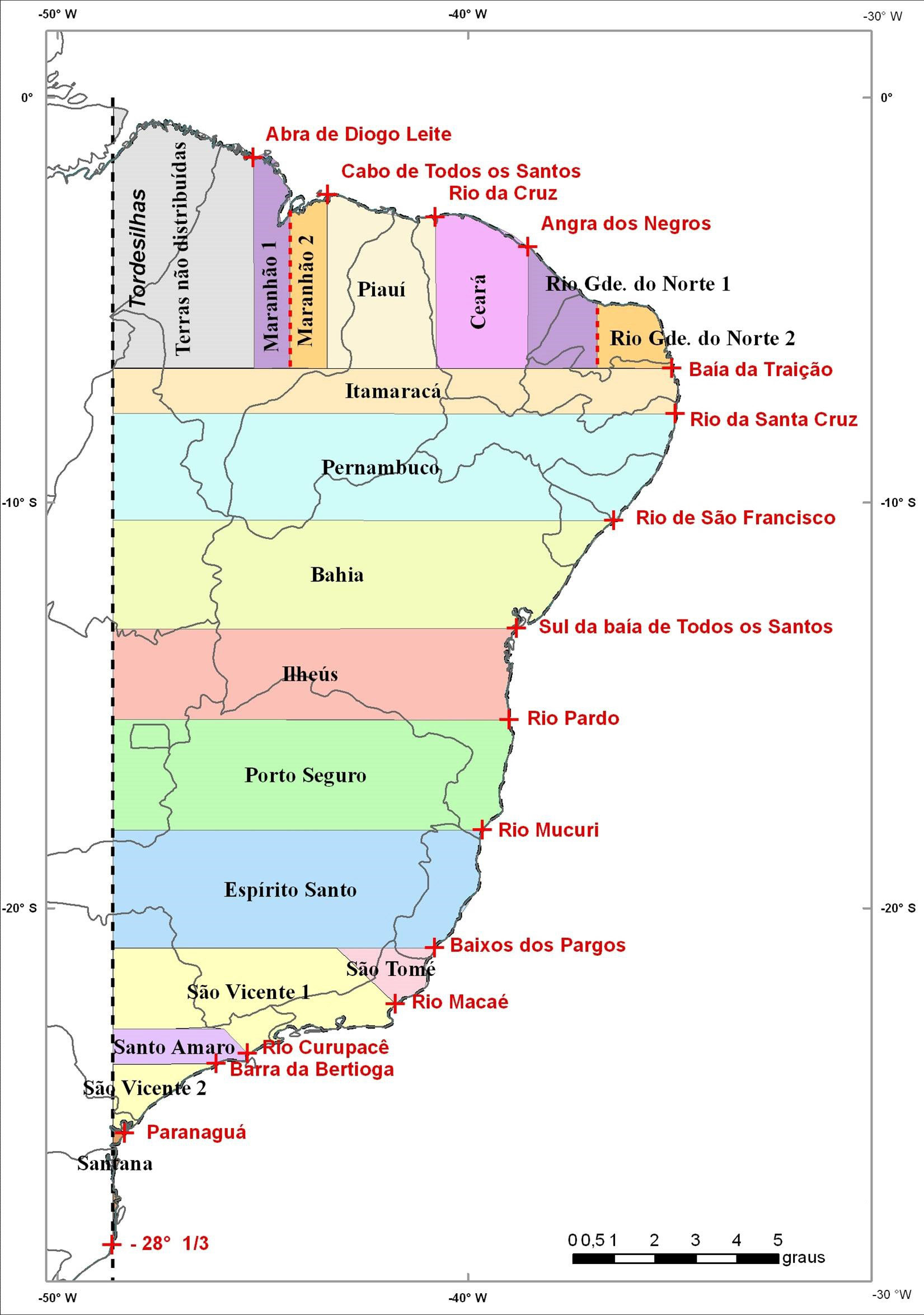
Map of the captaincies of Brazil in 1534

In 1500, the Portuguese explorer Pedro Álvares Cabral reached the northeastern coast of Brazil and claimed the territory of Brazil for the Portuguese Empire as set out in the Treaty of Tordesillas. It was not until 1534, however, that colonization began, spurred on by the increasing French presence in the Northeast. In that same year, the King of Portugal, John III, divided Brazil into fifteen captaincies. Most of what is now the state of Paraíba became part of the Captaincy of Itamaracá, which comprised a thin band of area stretching from the Tordesillas line at the far western extremity to the Ponta do Seixas, the easternmost point of Brazil. The remaining portions of the state fell under the neighboring captaincies of Rio Grande to the north and Pernambuco to the south. Itamaracá, in contrast to Pernambuco, continued to be troubled by French piracy, especially of wood, animal skins, and amber.

Convents, churches, and sugar mills began to sprout up in the captaincy as the colonial population grew. Where once the Portuguese had had a relatively conciliatory relationship with the Tupi people, due in part to their usefulness as allies against other European powers (the French, Dutch, and Spanish), as well as to other hostile indigenous peoples, the growth of the colonies sparked tensions. The principal reasons for heightened tensions were the encroachment of settlers on indigenous territory, driven by the establishment of sugarcane plantations and the increasing nutritional needs of a larger population; the new compulsory labor relations imposed by the Portuguese, which implied the abandonment of the indigenous agricultural production system, essential for the survival of the villages; and the fact that though they were banned from attacking Portuguese settlements, their own villages were subject to attacks from settlers searching for slave labor. Eventually, the tensions came to a head when the Potiguara people, urged on by the French, gathered around 2,000 tribesmen from Paraíba and Rio Grande and attacked the Tracunhaém plantation in 1574, killing all residents. The event had powerful reverberations in Lisbon, leading to King Henry creating the Royal Captaincy of Paraíba, which was subordinate directly to the Portuguese Crown. The "Tragedy of Tracunhaém" also served as the trigger for the Potiguara War, which lasted from 1574 to 1599.

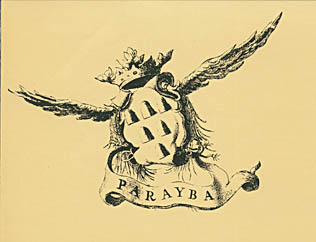
Coat of arms of the Captaincy of Paraíba

Though it was officially created in 1574, the Captaincy of Paraíba was only made reality eleven years after the fact. In 1572, Luís de Brito was named the governor-general of the country and the governor of the northern captaincies, including Itamaracá. He received from the King the order to punish those responsible for the Tracunhaém attack and create a new city to serve as the governor's seat. Brito's expedition, as well as the next three attempts, ended in failure. Finally, in 1584, the new governor-general, Manuel Teles Barreto, mounted a successful expedition with the help of the captain-major of the captaincy, Frutuoso Barbosa, and the fleet of Admiral D. Diogo Flores de Valdés. At the time, eastern Paraíba was inhabited by the Potiguara people and their rivals, the Tabajaras, who had moved there from the central region following a period of drought. The Tabajara joined the Portuguese and together they chased the Potiguara from the area, thereby completing their original mission. Having now conquered Paraíba, the colonists established the first Royal City in Brazil under the Philippine Dynasty in 1585, named "Filipeia de Nossa Senhora das Neves" (today the capital of Paraíba, João Pessoa). Additionally, to repel French invaders, they constructed the Forte de São Tiago on the edge of the Paraíba do Norte river.

=== Dutch invasion ===
Owing to its lucrative sugarcane industry, the Captaincy of Paraíba proved to be one of the most economically successful regions in Portuguese America, alongside Pernambuco and Bahia. Because of this, the Dutch were interested in claiming the Northeast region and first attempted to do so in 1624 by seizing the then-capital city of Brazil, Salvador, in Bahia. Following their expulsion from Salvador, the Dutch made their first appearance on Paraíban territory on June 20, 1625, when they arrived in the Bay of Traição to treat their sick and bury their dead. The Dutch Admiral, Boudewijn Hendricksz, quickly formed an alliance with the Potiguaras, promising them protection in return for military support against the Portuguese. The governor of Paraíba, Antônio de Albuquerque, sent troops to drive away the invaders. Seven companies of men from the Captaincy of Paraíba, the Captaincy of Pernambuco, the Captaincy of Rio Grande, and from indigenous tribes succeeded in defeating the Dutch on August 1, at least for the time being. Hendricksz was able to escape, fleeing to Puerto Rico. During the battle, however, the Potiguaras suffered heavy losses of 600 to a thousand dead.

On December 5, 1632, 1,600 Dutchmen landed on Paraíban shores. After undergoing fire from the Portuguese, they began digging trenches in front of the Forte de Santa Catarina, located in Cabedelo, 18 km away from the center of Filipeia de Nossa Senhora das Neves (João Pessoa). Despite this stand, the Dutch once again proved unable to seize Paraíba and they were forced to retreat to Pernambuco, which they had already conquered in 1630.

The Dutch attempted the invasion anew on November 25, 1634, with the arrival of a squadron of 29 ships on the coast of Paraíba. Though reinforcements were sent to Paraíba from as far as Europe to repel the Dutch, the Portuguese had already been too weakened, and allowed the Forte de Santa Catarina and the Forte de Santo Antônio to fall into the hands of the Dutch. The Dutch then went to Filipeia de Nossa Senhora das Neves in search of Governor Antônio de Albuquerque, who was in command of the Portuguese troops. On Christmas Eve, they entered the city, but did not find Albuquerque; instead, they found empty streets and abandoned homes, a shell of the former city. With that final nail in the coffin — despite some ongoing resistance from the local population — the Dutch had finally conquered Paraíba. After the Dutch invasion, the sugarcane economy, the principal industry of the region, was devastated, as many sugarcane plantations on the coast had been set on fire. It was not until 1654, two decades later, that the Portuguese would finally retake Paraíba.

=== Expansion ===
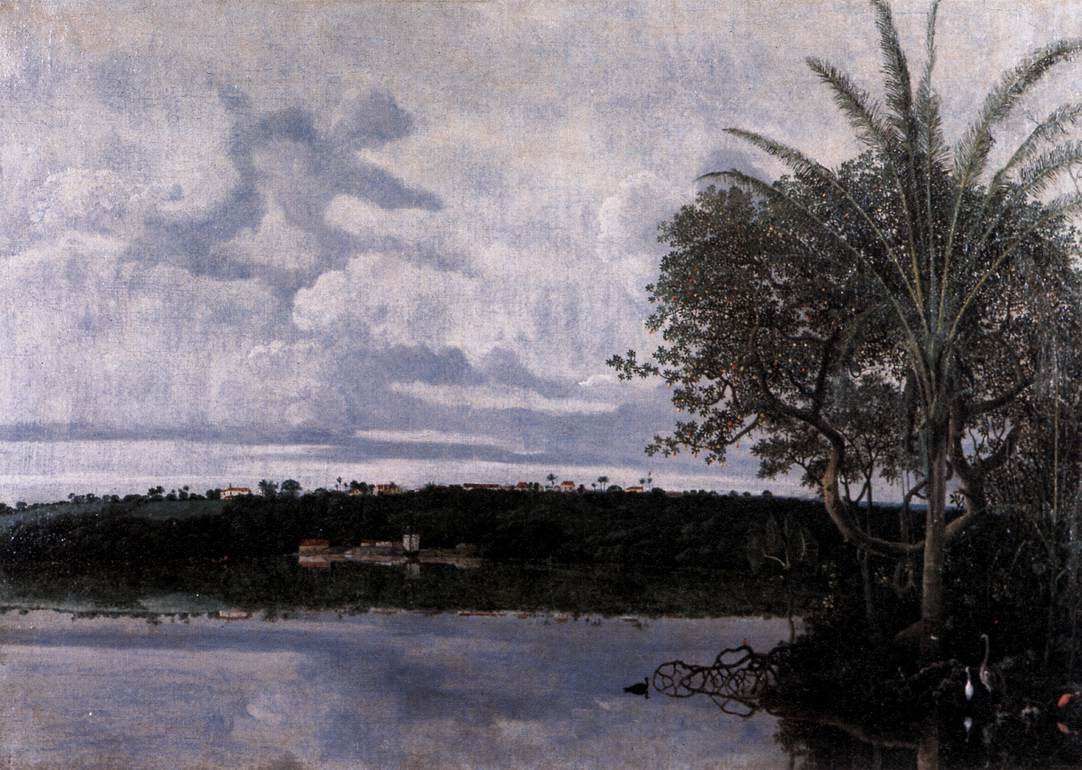
Frederiksstad, modern-day João Pessoa, in 1638, by Frans Post

Until 1670, colonial occupation of Paraíba had mostly been restricted to the east, near the coast, but from that point forward, colonists started pushing further into the interior. Much of these efforts were carried out by fortune-seeking explorers called bandeirantes, led by Domingos Jorge Velho. This expansion resulted in conflicts with the indigenous tribes of the region, including the enslavement and massacre of indigenous peoples.

Western expansion was also spearheaded by Catholic missionaries, who sought to convert the local indigenous population. One of the most important missionaries of this time was the priest Martim Nantes, who founded the village of Pilar.

On January 1, 1756, the Captaincy of Paraíba was dissolved and annexed to Pernambuco. This lasted until 1799, when it became the Captaincy of Paraíba again. At this time, some minor adjustments were made to Paraíba's borders, with a portion of its northern territory being given to Rio Grande do Norte.

=== Revolt ===
Throughout its history, Paraíba participated in various revolts. The Pernambuco Revolution of 1817 stands out as an example; inspired by the War of Independence in the United States and the French Revolution, its objective was to make Brazil an independent country. From its origins in Pernambuco, the revolution spread to the entire Northeast. In Paraíba, the movement arose in the southern municipality of Itabaiana and fanned out to the agreste, sertão, and coast. The movement proved unsuccessful, though the struggle for independence continued on afterwards. The following five years (1818–1822) were marked by clashes between two rival factions: the cajás, also called patriots, who were revolutionaries, and the carambolas (realists), who were counterrevolutionaries.

In 1822, Brazil finally became an independent country and Paraíba was turned into a province of the Brazilian Empire of King Pedro I. Two years later, Paraíba was implicated in the Confederation of the Equator, which was an anti-authoritarian movement that started in Pernambuco. The movement was suppressed by Imperial forces, with some of the leaders sentenced to execution.

Inspired by the various revolutions that took place in Europe in 1848, the Praieira Revolt was organized in Pernambuco at the end of that same year. It arrived in Paraíba in February 1849, led by Maximiano Machado and Borges da Fonseca, demanding various social and economic reforms, such as land ownership changes, democracy, and freedom of the press. The revolt only lasted for about five months and ended in failure. Three years later, in 1851, Paraíba and its neighboring provinces became involved in the Ronco da Abelha revolt. This revolt was a reaction to new modernization laws from the Imperial government that, it was falsely rumored, would enslave the lower-classes of workers in Paraíba now that the slave trade was prohibited in Brazil. Between the months of October and December 1874, Paraíba participated in the Quebra–Quilos revolt, which was instigated by the replacement of the measurement system in Brazil with the metric system. The uprising was mostly concentrated in rural areas and was characterized by several acts of violence, at the same time as the so-called Religious Issue was gaining momentum. Paraíba also participated in the Paraguayan War, with a force of three thousand men.

In 1860, Paraíba had a population of about 212,000 people and suffered from several serious public health problems, including epidemics like cholera and yellow fever. One of the main causes of these issues was the lack of water in the largely semi-arid climate of the province. In 1877, Paraíba was hit by the worst drought in its history, accentuating poverty and prompting migration from the interior to the east.

=== Building a republic ===
In November 1889, after the fall of the monarchical regime in Brazil and the institution of a republic, Paraíba became a federal state. Venâncio Neiva became the first president — equivalent to the modern-day role of governor — of the state. Neiva served from 1889 to 1891, when he was deposed. The next president was a member of the Social Nationalist Party (PSN), Floriano Peixoto. The PSN governed Paraíba until 1908, when the Conservative Republican Party (PRC) won the elections. The PRC then remained in power for an additional two decades, until the end of the Old Republic in 1930.

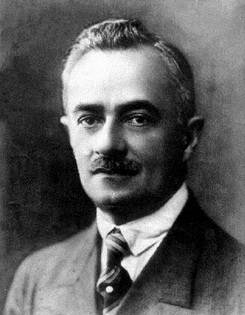
João Pessoa Cavalcanti de Albuquerque, governor of Paraíba from 1928 to 1930, the year of his assassination

After the onset of the First World War (1914–1918), the economy of Paraíba entered a crisis, mainly due to the drop in exports of one of the main agricultural products of the state, cotton. In the April 1919 federal election, the Paraíban candidate Epitácio Pessoa won; at the time, he was leading the Brazilian delegation at the Paris Peace Conference. After returning to Brazil, he was sworn in as president on July 28, 1919, and remained in office until November 15, 1922. It was during his government that Brazil celebrated its first centennial of independence.

Dissatisfied with the current oligarchical system, in February 1926 a rebel group called the Coluna Prestes entered Paraíba. The group faced resistance from the local population as they traveled through cities in the hinterland, including in Piancó where a local political leader, Father Aristides Ferreira da Cruz, died during the clashes, becoming one of the Martyrs of Piancó. The sertão was also home to other groups operating outside the law, namely the cangaço bandits (cangaceiros), the most well-known of which is Virgulino Ferreira da Silva (Lampião).

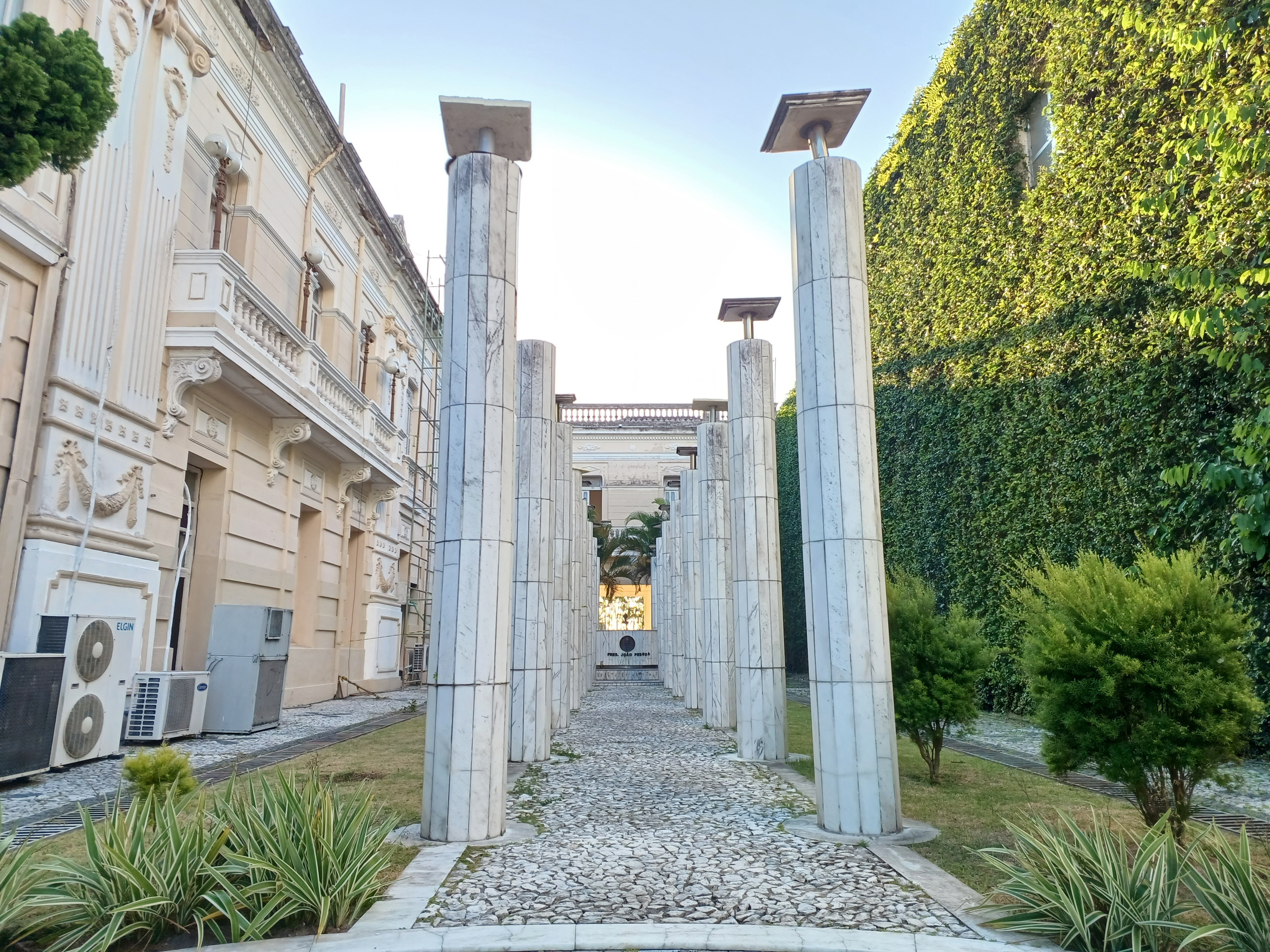
João Pessoa's mausoleum

In 1928, João Pessoa (the nephew of Epitácio Pessoa, the former president of Brazil) was elected as governor of Paraíba. Under his administration, cangaceiros in the interior of the state were persecuted and oligarchs were defied, generating discontent among the local landlords. This was especially the case with José Pereira Lima, a political leader of the municipality of Princesa Isabel and an ally of presidential candidate Júlio Prestes. With the invasion of the city of Teixeira by the Paraíban police and the imminent invasion of Lima's own Princesa Isabel, on February 28, 1930, he proclaimed the independent "Território de Princesa", which would only be subordinate directly to the federal government. The next day, the national election took place, with João Pessoa as the vice-presidential candidate for Getúlio Vargas. Though they had the support of the Liberal Alliance (Aliança Liberal), created by Paraíba together with Minas Gerais and Rio Grande do Sul in the last year, they were defeated by Júlio Prestes and Vital Soares.

On July 26, 1930, João Pessoa was assassinated by João Duarte Dantas. Generating great national commotion, especially among the states of the Liberal Alliance, the death of João Pessoa was one of the triggers of the Revolution of 1930 that brought Vargas to power. It also resulted in the weakening of the armed movement in Território de Princesa, which became a part of Paraíba again on August 11, 1930, four days after João Pessoa was buried in the city of Rio de Janeiro. The state capital was then renamed to João Pessoa and, three weeks later, the current flag of Paraíba was adopted, representing Pessoa's stand against the presidency of Júlio Prestes. Between the 1930 revolution and Vargas' fall from power in 1946, the state of Paraíba was governed by ten federal appointees, the first being Antenor de França Navarro (1930–1932) and the last being José Gomes da Silva (1946–1947). Only in January 1947 did Paraíba start holding direct elections for the governorship again, with the first governor under the new president being Osvaldo Trigueiro (1947–1951).

In 1964, a coup d'état by military forces deposed President João Goulart from power and instituted a military dictatorship. Pedro Gondim, the governor of Paraíba, had been allied with Goulart, resulting in his mandate being revoked and his political rights being suspended for ten years by the new administration. Among the local Paraíban population, opponents to the coup were arrested, exiled, tortured, or killed, with an amnesty only being granted in the late 1970s. The next few governors were all indirectly elected, either by the legislative assembly or the electoral college, until 1983 when Wilson Braga was democratically elected governor. With the constitution of 1988, Brazil returned to a democratic system of government.

In 1997, the body of former president João Pessoa was transferred from Rio de Janeiro to the eponymous capital of Paraíba, where he was buried in a mausoleum built by the state government.

=== Twenty-first century ===
In 2009, Governor Cássio Cunha Lima was impeached after being elected two terms in a row. As such, the runner-up of the previous elections, José Maranhão, who had already been governor from 1995 to 2002, was reappointed as governor of Paraíba. Despite the confirmation of Lima's impeachment by the Superior Electoral Court (Tribunal Superior Eleitoral), he ran again in 2014, though he lost to the former mayor of João Pessoa, Ricardo Coutinho, first elected in 2011.

Between 2012 and 2017, Paraíba faced the worst drought in its recent history, which put more than 90% of Paraíba municipalities in a state of emergency and had significant ramifications for agriculture, electricity generation, and water supply. In 2017, after years in the works, the east axis of the multi-billion dollar São Francisco river transfer project was completed, allowing for water to be diverted to the Paraíba do Norte river. The goal of the project — the largest water infrastructure project in Brazil's history — is to alleviate the impact of droughts and water shortages in the semi-arid regions of the Northeast.

== Geography ==
Paraíba, located in the eastern portion of the broader Northeast region, is one of 27 states of Brazil. Its total area is 56,467.242 km^{2}, making it the seventh smallest state in the country and the fourth smallest in the Northeast. The distance between its north and south extremities is 263 kilometers, and that of its east and west extremities is 443 kilometers. On average, the state sits at a relatively low elevation, with its highest elevations found in the Borborema Plateau in the center of the state. The highest peak in Paraíba and the third highest peak in the Northeast, Pico do Jabre, is located in this plateau at 1,208 meters above sea level.

There are 11 river basins in Paraíba, the largest of which is the Piancó-Piranhas-Açu river basin, which feeds six sub-basins and covers an area of approximately 26,047.49 km^{2}, followed by the Paraíba river basin, which feeds four sub-basins and covers an area of approximately 20,071.83 km^{2}.

=== Climate ===
Köppen climate map of Paraíba

The majority of Paraíba is considered to have a hot semi-arid climate, with almost 98% of its territory included in the so-called "Polygon of Drought." Parts of the state that do not fall into this category, namely the far east and far west, have a tropical climate.

Paraíba goes through wet and dry seasons, with most of its rain falling in the first third of the year, especially in March and April. However, in the east, including the coast and the agreste mesoregion, most rainfall occurs from April to June.

In the entire state, the period from October to December is the hottest and driest of the year, whereas June to August is the coldest, with temperatures in some areas reaching below 20 °C. Areia, located in the agreste, is the coldest city of the state while Patos, located in the sertão, is the hottest. A record low temperature of 7.7 °C was recorded in the city of Monteiro on July 28, 1976.

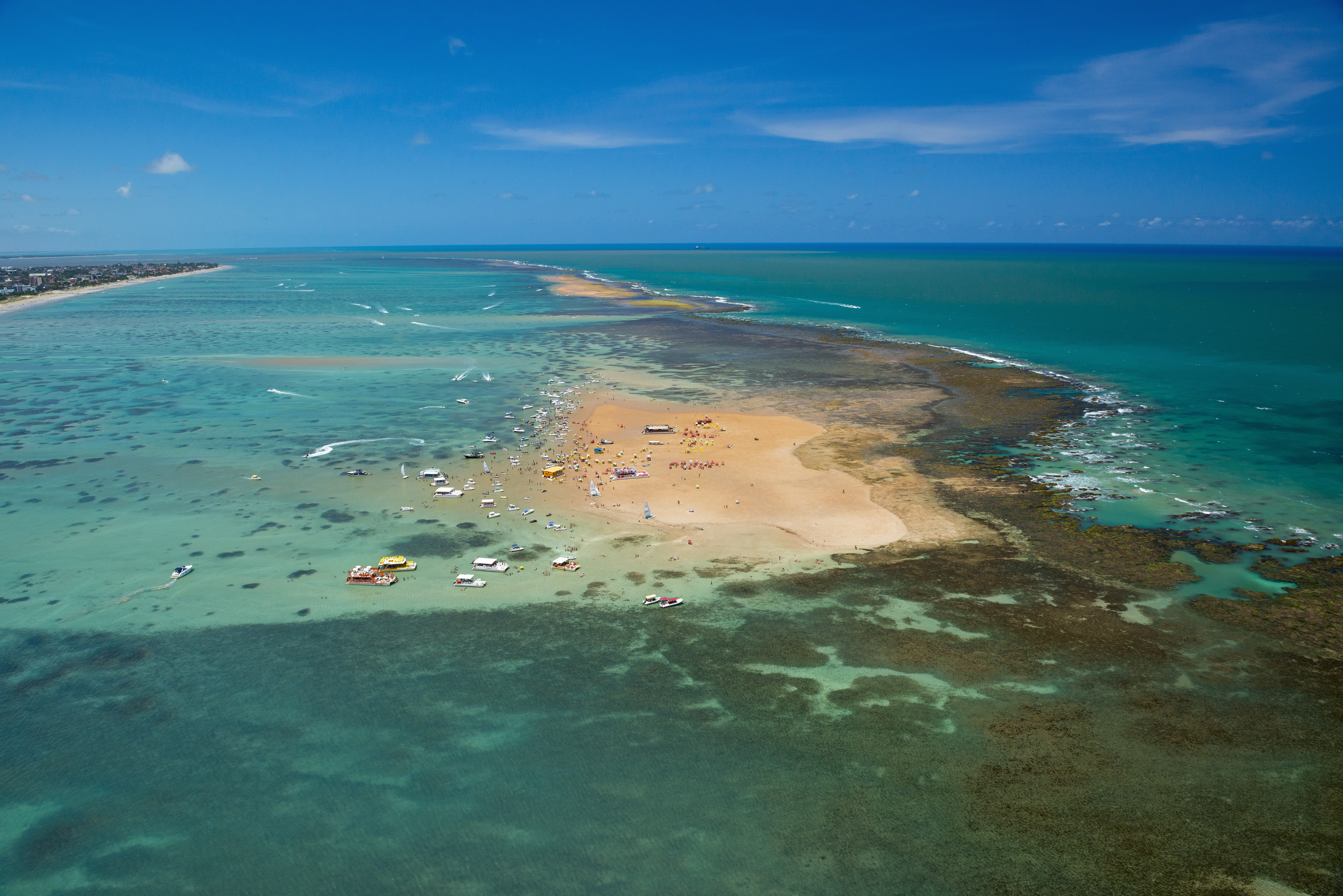
Areia Vermelha Marine State Park

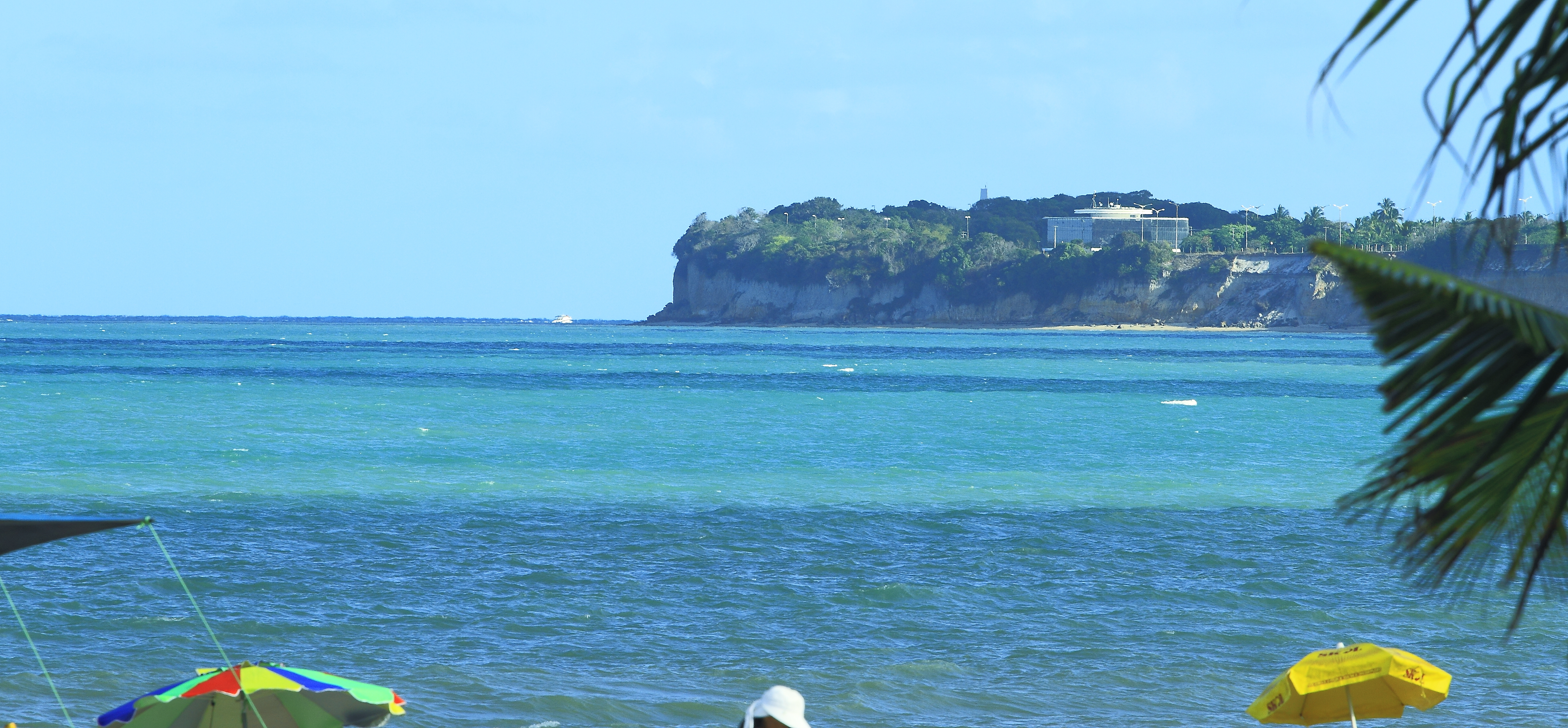
Ponta do Seixas, the easternmost point of the American continents

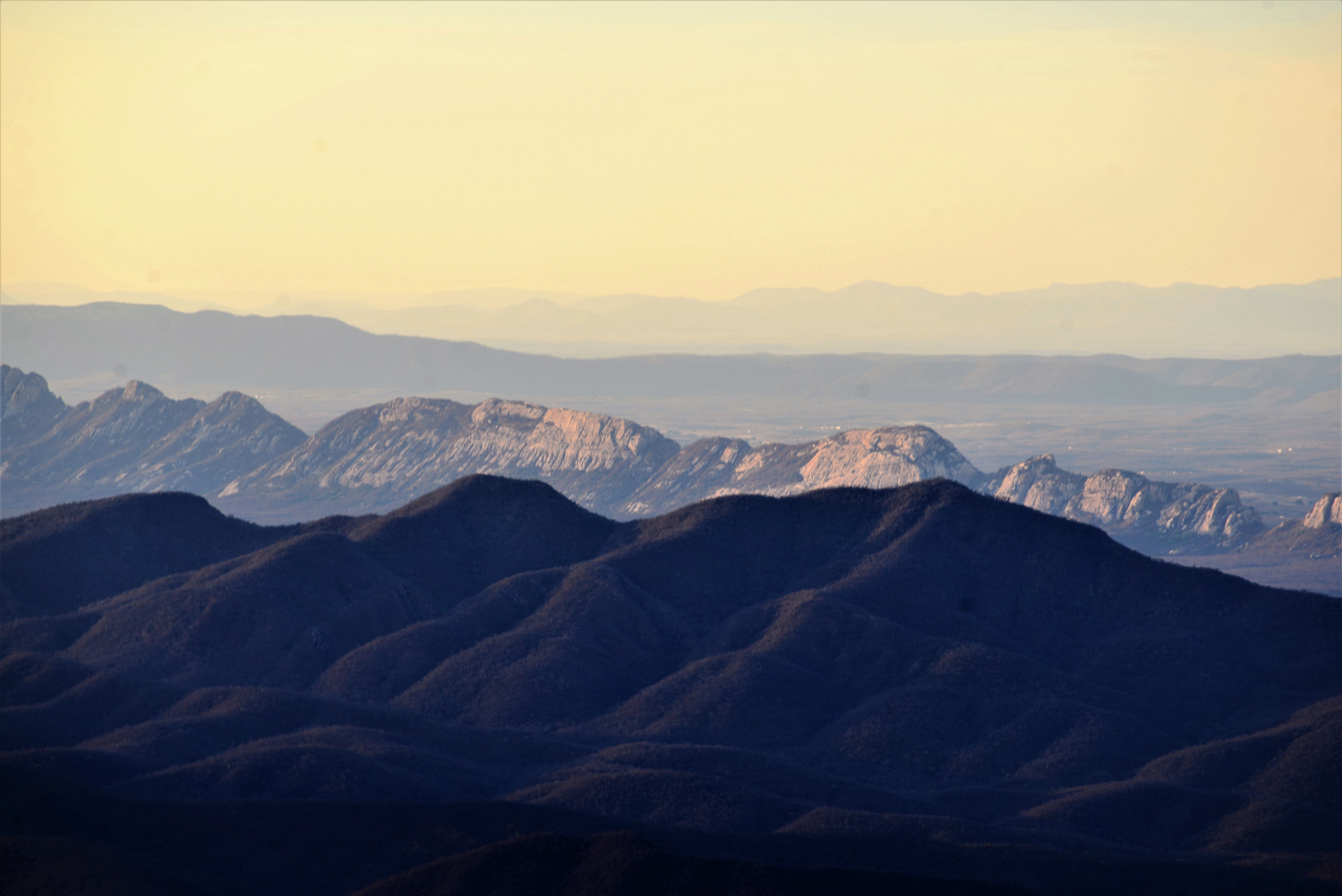
Pico do Jabre is the highest point in the state

=== Geology ===
In 1987, a team led by gemstone prospector Heitor Dimas Barbosa uncovered tourmaline crystals in the Batalha mine, about 50 km away from Patos. A trace of copper gives the tourmalines a vivid turquoise color that is sometimes referred to as "neon".

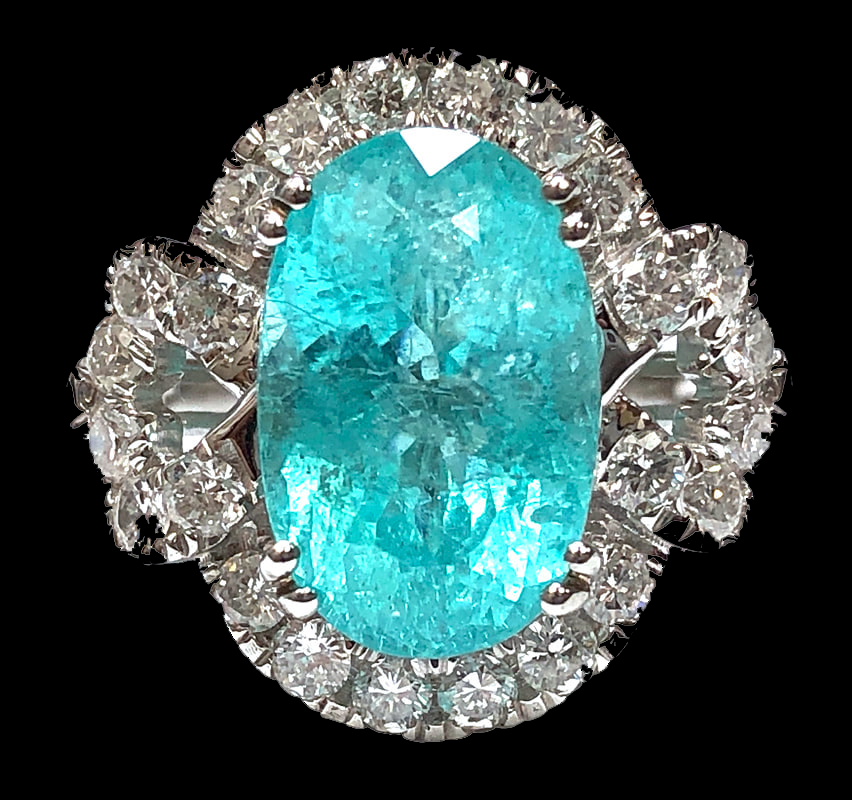
A paraiba tourmaline and diamond ring in platinum

The neon Paraíba tourmaline has also been found in the neighboring state of Rio Grande do Norte. In the early 2000s, tourmaline gems containing copper and bearing similar colors were found in Nigeria and Mozambique.

Initially, the nomenclature for this tourmaline was "Paraíba tourmaline". In 2006, the LMHC (Laboratory Manual Harmonization Committee) agreed that "Paraíba" should be simplified to "paraiba" and should refer to a variety of tourmaline instead of indicating a geographic origin. The term "paraiba tourmaline" may now refer to gems found in Brazil, Nigeria, and Mozambique that contain copper and have the characteristic fluorescent blue-green color.

The stone has since become among the most sought-after gemstones on the market, yielding upwards of $50,000+ per carat. These tourmalines are often subject to heat-treatment and clarity enhancement to achieve a more desirable color. A lack of these treatments often increases the value of the stone.

== Demographics ==
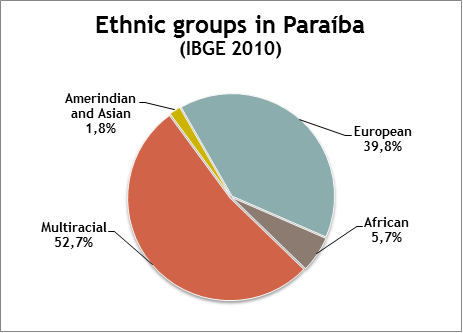
Ethnic groups in Paraíba as of 2010

According to the 2022 census, there were 3,974,687 people residing in the state, with a population density of 70.4 inhabitants/km^{2}. Other numbers include: Urbanization rate: 75.4% (2010), Population growth: 0.8% (1991–2000) and Houses: 987,000 (2006).

The 2022 census also revealed the following figures relating ethnicity: 2,207,880 Brown (Multiracial) people (55.5%), 1,419,778 White people (35.7%), 316,572 Black people (8.0%), 25,478 Amerindian people (0.6%) and 4,912 Asian (0.1%) people.

Among people of mixed ancestry the White, Amerindian and African altogether combination is the most prevalent one, followed by caboclo, mulato and zambo.

=== Largest cities ===
Largest cities or towns in Paraíba (2011 census by the Brazilian Institute of Geography and Statistics)
Rank		Mesoregion	Pop.	Rank		Mesoregion	Pop.
1	João Pessoa	Mata	733154	11	Mamanguape	Mata	42602
2	Campina Grande	Agreste	387643	12	Queimadas	Agreste	41297
3	Santa Rita	Mata	121166	13	Solânea	Agreste	38.991
4	Patos	Sertão	101358	14	Pombal	Sertão	32122
5	Bayeux	Mata	100136	15	Esperança	Agreste	31320
6	Sousa	Sertão	66135	16	São Bento	Sertão	31236
7	Cabedelo	Mata	59104	17	Monteiro	Borborema	31095
8	Cajazeiras	Sertão	58793	18	Alagoa Grande	Agreste	28426
9	Guarabira	Agreste	55657	19	Pedras de Fogo	Mata	27389
10	Sapé	Mata	50357	20	Cuité	Agreste	25950

Religion in Paraíba (2010)
1. Catholicism (77.0%)
2. Protestantism (15.1%)
3. Spiritism (0.60%)
4. Other (1.60%)
5. No religion (5.70%)

Historical population
Year	Pop.	±%
1872	376,226	—
1890	457,232	+21.5%
1900	490,784	+7.3%
1920	961,106	+95.8%
1940	1,422,282	+48.0%
1950	1,713,259	+20.5%
1960	2,018,023	+17.8%
1970	2,445,419	+21.2%
1980	2,810,032	+14.9%
1991	3,200,677	+13.9%
2000	3,444,794	+7.6%
2010	3,766,528	+9.3%
2022	3,974,687	+5.5%

=== Religion ===
According to the 2010 census, the population of Paraíba is made up of Roman Catholics (76.96%), Protestants (15.16%), Spiritists (0.62%), Jehovah's Witnesses (0.47%), Brazilian Apostolic Catholics (0.22%), Mormons (0.11%), Orthodox Christians (0.05%), Candomblecists (0.035%), Umbanda (0.029%), Esoteric (0.023%), Jewish (0.017%), Eastern religious (0.014%), indigenous traditions ( 0.010%), spiritualists (0.004%), Islamic (0.002%), Hindus (0.002%) and Afro-Brazilian religious (0.001%), in addition to other religiosities. There were also those without religion (5.661%), including atheists (0.106%) and agnostics (0.046%); people with indeterminate religion and/or multiple belonging (0.154%); those who did not know (0.154%) and did not declare (0.016%).

=== Statistics ===
- Vehicles: 432,337 (March/2007);
- Mobile phones: 1.5 million (April/2007)
- Fixed line telephones: 431 thousand (April/2007)
- Cities: 223 (2007).

=== Education ===
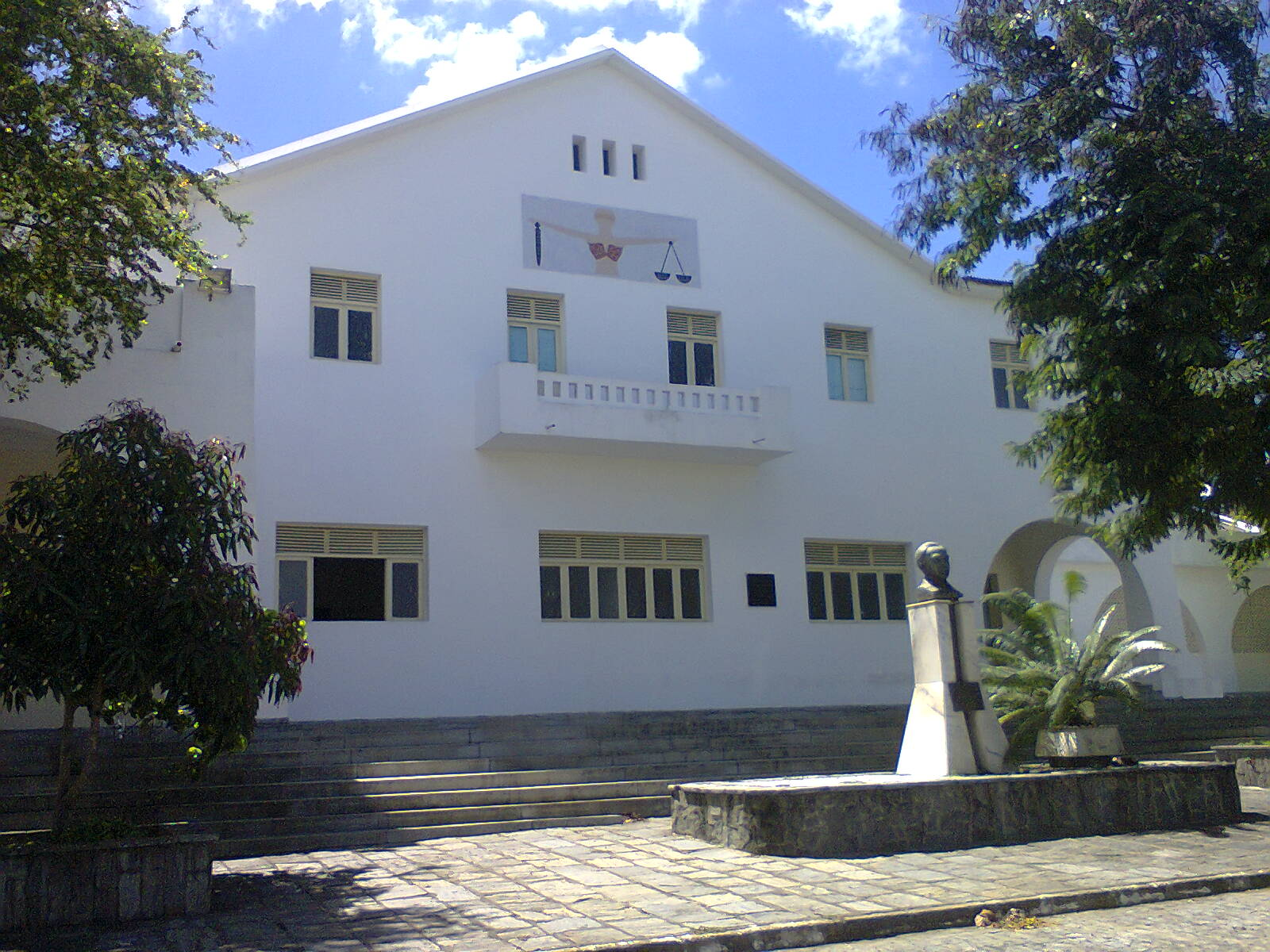
Law school of the State University of Paraíba, Campina Grande campus

Portuguese is the official and only language spoken in the state and thus the primary language taught in schools. However, significant dialectal differences regarding other Brazilian varieties are present, although mainly phonological (Northeastern accent).

English and Spanish are part of the official high school curriculum.

==== Educational institutions ====
- Universidade Federal da Paraíba (UFPB) (Federal University of Paraíba);
- Universidade Federal de Campina Grande (UFCG) (Federal University of Campina Grande)
- Universidade Estadual da Paraíba (UEPB) (State University of Paraíba);
- UNIPÊ (Centro Universitário de João Pessoa);
- Instituto de Educação Superior da Paraíba (IESP);
- Faculdade Maurício de Nassau (FMN) (Maurício de Nassau College);
- Instituto Federal de Educação Tecnológica (IFPB) (Federal Institute of Technology of Paraiba);
- and many others.

== Economy ==
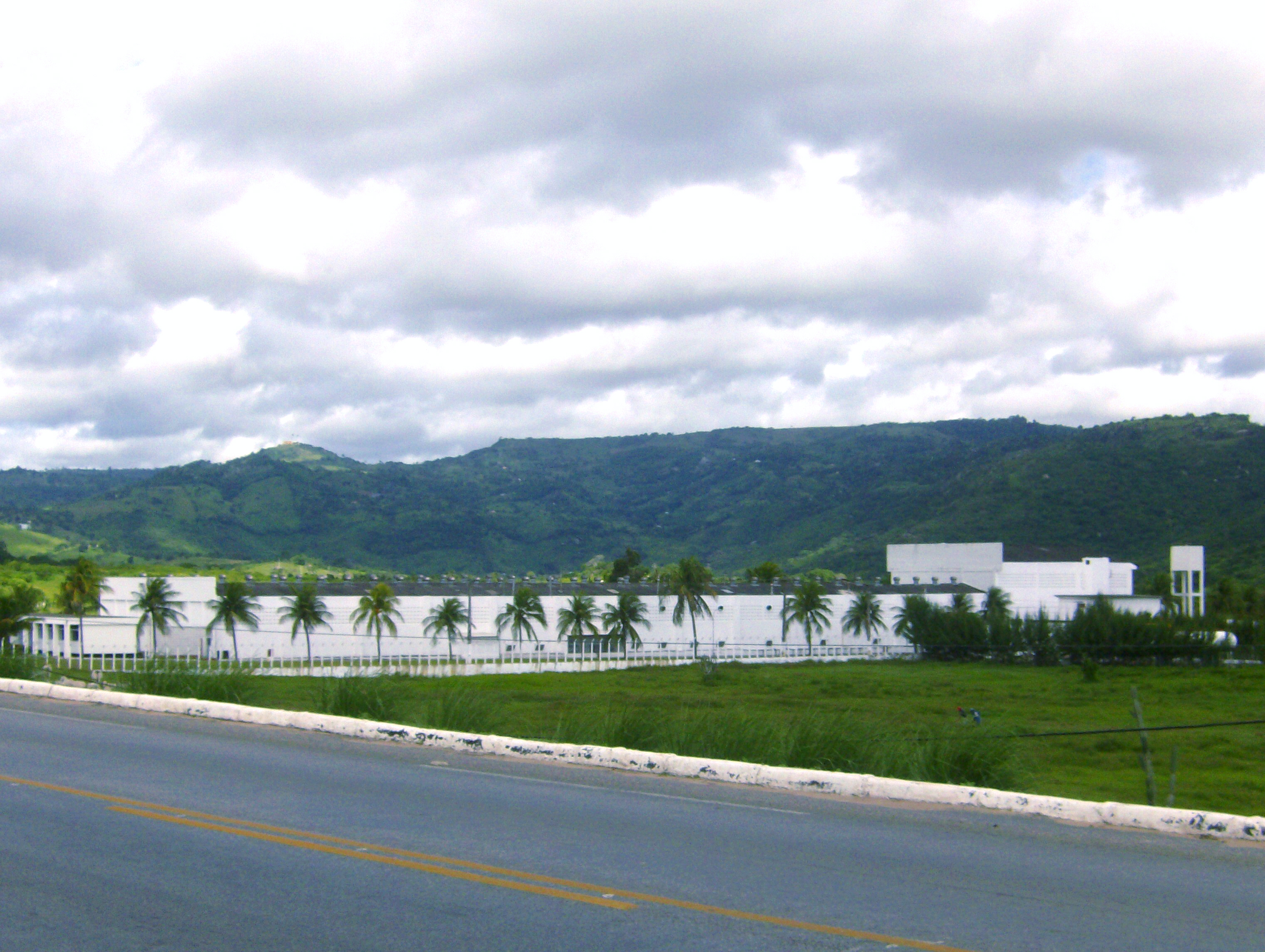
Food industry in Belém da Paraíba

The service sector is the largest component of GDP at 56.5%, followed by the industrial sector at 33.1%. Agriculture represents 10.4%, of GDP (2004). Paraíba exports: woven of cotton 36.3%, footweares 20.1%, sugar and alcohol 10.8%, fish and crustacean 9.7%, sisal 7%, cotton 6.6% (2002).

Share of the Brazilian economy: 0.8% (2004).

The Paraíba economy is largely based upon the making of shoes and other leather products, the raising of cattle for beef, and sugarcane, corn. Though historically sugarcane has dominated the Paraíba agricultural sector, pineapple, corn, and beans cultivation are also widespread. The other important economical sector in the state is tourism, especially the state urban and unspoilt beaches, ecotourism and festivals such as "carnaval" and "São João."

== Infrastructure ==
=== International Airport ===
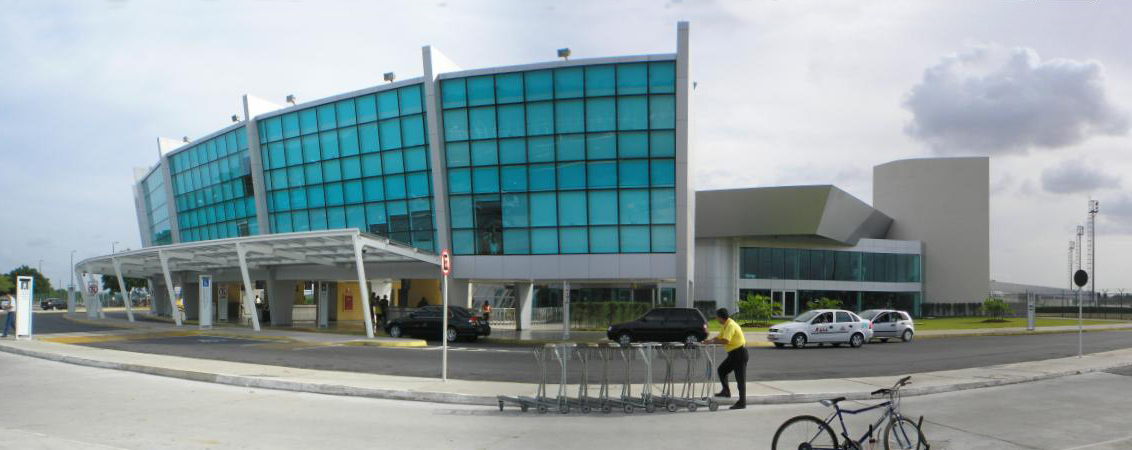
Presidente Castro Pinto International Airport (JPA)

Located in the municipality of Bayeux, eight kilometres (5.0 mi) from downtown João Pessoa, Presidente Castro Pinto International Airport is currently undergoing expansion and remodeling work, which will raise the terminal's annual capacity to 860 thousand passengers. The airport is well located in relation to obstacles because it covers an area roughly 65 metres (213 feet) above sea level and is sufficiently distant from urban areas or large real estate developments.

The surrounding area is sparsely populated, with large open spaces. The existing developments are industrial with some small weekend country houses. There is no rough terrain or tall buildings nearby creating obstacles for takeoffs and landings. The airport also is blessed with excellent climatic conditions for air operations. Moreover, within its approach radius there are no obstacles that can hinder or create risk for local air traffic. Named for a past president (former name for governors) of Paraíba, Castro Pinto, the airport operates round the clock.

The current passenger terminal, built in an area of 8,947.72 square metres (96,312.46 square feet), has two levels, gardens and ample vehicle parking. It has all the expected amenities: arrival and departure lounges, a main concourse, check-in counters, baggage storage lockers, airline counters, snack bar/restaurant, tourist information booth, car rental agencies, taxi service and private parking.

=== Highways ===
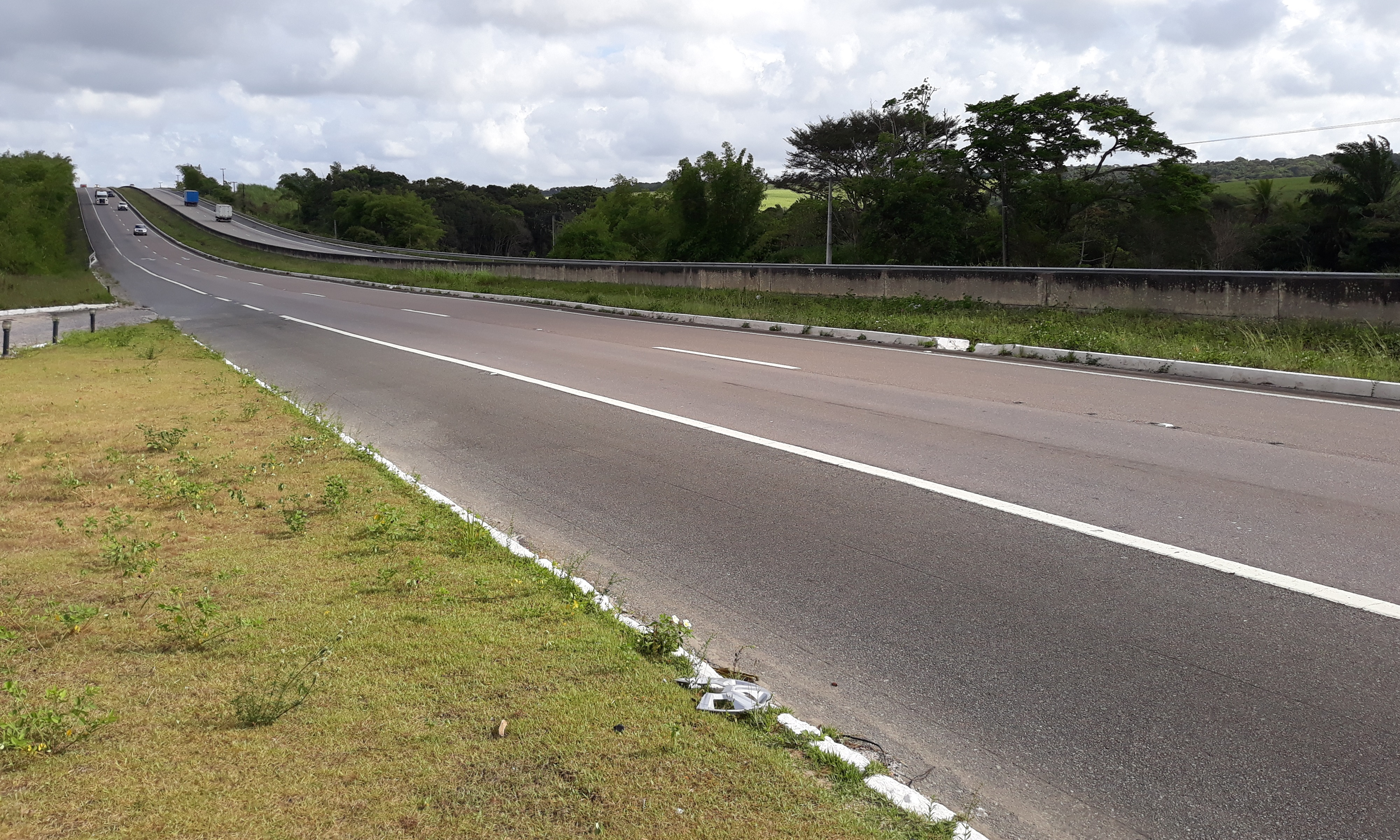
BR-101 Highway in Paraíba

The BR-101 also the BR-230 are found in Paraíba . Several other roads also cross the state composing the complex net which is present all across the country.

=== National Airport ===
Located in the interior of the state of Paraíba, in the city of Campina Grande, João Suassuna Airport was remodeled in 2003, receiving a new terminal with capacity of 250 thousand passengers a year.

The old building was demolished and on the site a new facility was built holding nine shops, the main concourse, arrival and departure lounges, VIP lounge, bathrooms, mezzanine and a diaper-changing area.

The terminal area was increased to 2,500 square metres (27,000 square feet). The boarding area has 350 square metres (3,800 square feet) and the parking lot has spaces for 180 cars.

This expansion benefited the city both economically and from the standpoint of tourism. With the possibility for new flights, the air cargo movement will be able to grow, along with the number of tourists coming to attend the city's São João Festival. A panel measuring 17 by 3.5 metres (56 by 11 feet) in the front of the building carries a poem by the Paraíban writer Ariano Suassuna, in homage to his father, for whom the airport is named. Three more artworks are on permanent display in the passenger terminal.

== Culture ==
=== Festa Junina (Saint John Festival) ===
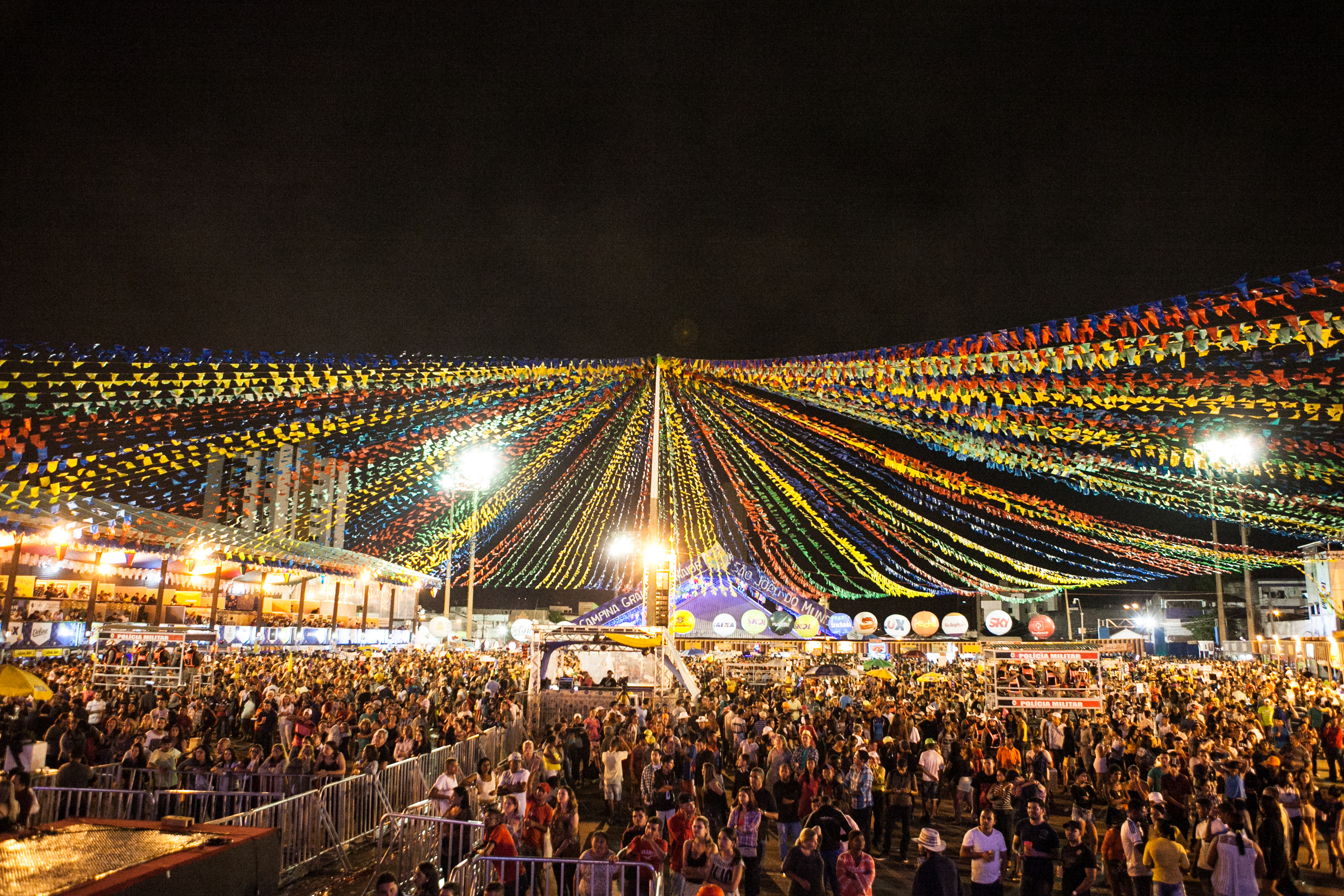
Saint John Festival in Campina Grande

Festa Junina was introduced to Northeastern Brazil by the Portuguese for whom St John's day (also celebrated as Midsummer Day in several European countries), on the 24th of June, is one of the oldest celebrations of the year. Differently, of course, from what happens on the European Midsummer Day, the festivities in Brazil do not take place during the summer solstice but during the winter solstice. The festivities traditionally begin after the 12th of June, on the eve of St Anthony's day, and last until the 29th, which is Saint Peter's day. During these fifteen days, there are bonfires, fireworks, and folk dancing in the streets (step names are in French, which shows the mutual influences between court life and peasant culture in the 17th, 18th, and 19th-century Europe). Once exclusively a rural festival, today in Brazil, it is largely a city festival during which people joyfully and theatrically mimic peasant stereotypes and clichés in a spirit of jokes and good times. Typical refreshments and dishes are served. Like during Carnival, these festivities involve costume-wearing (in this case, peasant costumes), dancing, heavy drinking, and visual spectacles (fireworks display and folk dancing), such as what happens on Midsummer and St John's Day in Europe, and bonfires are a central part of these festivities in Brazil.

=== Carnival ===
The four-day period before Lent leading up to Ash Wednesday is carnival time in Brazil. Rich and poor alike forget their cares as they party in the streets.

== Flag ==
The word nego on the state flag is Portuguese for "I deny" or "I refuse", referring to the events that led to the Revolution of 1930.

Due to Milk Coffee Politics in Brazil, the president of the country always alternated between someone from the state of Minas Gerais and someone from the state of São Paulo. In 1929, the incumbent president from São Paulo, Washington Luís, was supposed to support a politician from Minas Gerais as the next president, but he instead decided to nominate someone from São Paulo for the second time in a row, Júlio Prestes. The state governor of Paraíba, João Pessoa Cavalcânti de Albuquerque, refused to support the appointment of Júlio Prestes, and in 1930, Pessoa joined the alliance for the overthrow of the federal government. The revolution succeeded in toppling the Old Republic and installing Getúlio Vargas—who was from neither Minas Gerais nor São Paulo—as the president of Brazil, however, João Pessoa was assassinated; there is still debate as to whether the motive behind his murder was personal, political, or both. Following these events, the word nego was added to the flag of Paraíba.

According to the official government site of the state of Paraíba, the red color stands for the blood of João Pessoa after his assassination, while the black color represents mourning.

== Sports ==
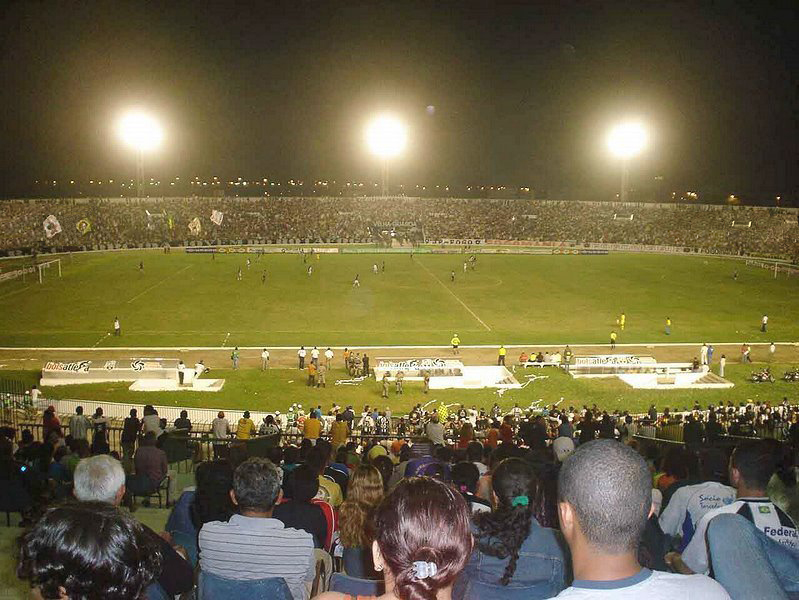
Almeidão stadium in João Pessoa

In football, the main teams in the state are: Botafogo from João Pessoa, Campinense and Treze, both from Campina Grande.

== Important figures and celebrities ==
- Kaio de Almeida, Brazilian swimmer
- Zé Marco, beach volleyball player
- Hulk, football player
- Matheus Cunha, Brazilian football player
- Douglas Santos, Brazilian football player
- Álvaro, Brazilian beach volleyball player
- George Wanderley, beach volleyball player
- João Batista, Brazilian sprinter

== See also ==
- Captaincy of Paraíba
- Brazil
- Ingá Stone (Undeciphered petroglyph in Ingá municipality)
- List of municipalities in Paraíba
