= History of Paraíba =

Historical aspects of Paraíba, Brazil

Flag of Paraíba.

The history of Paraíba began before the discovery of Brazil, when the coastline of the state's current territory was populated by the Tabajara and Potiguara indigenous peoples. When the Portuguese arrived, the region was established as part of the Captaincy of Itamaracá. However, there were difficulties in implementing the Portuguese occupation fronts in the area, especially due to the resistance of the natives and the influence of French explorers, who used the coast of Paraíba for the illegal extraction of brazilwood.

As a result of the establishment of sugarcane mills, the region experienced high economic and demographic growth and consolidated itself as one of the northeastern centers of colonial Brazil. After spending a period under Dutch rule, Paraíba returned to Portuguese control in 1654. It became a federal captaincy in 1799, a province of the Empire of Brazil in 1882 and a state of the federation of Brazil in 1889. (Note: A privateer, or corsair, was not a pirate, but the captain of a ship authorized by a government's mission or charter to plunder the vessels of other nations. Corsairs were a cheap way of weakening the enemy and disrupting their sea routes.)

== 15th and 16th centuries ==
=== Maritime expeditions ===
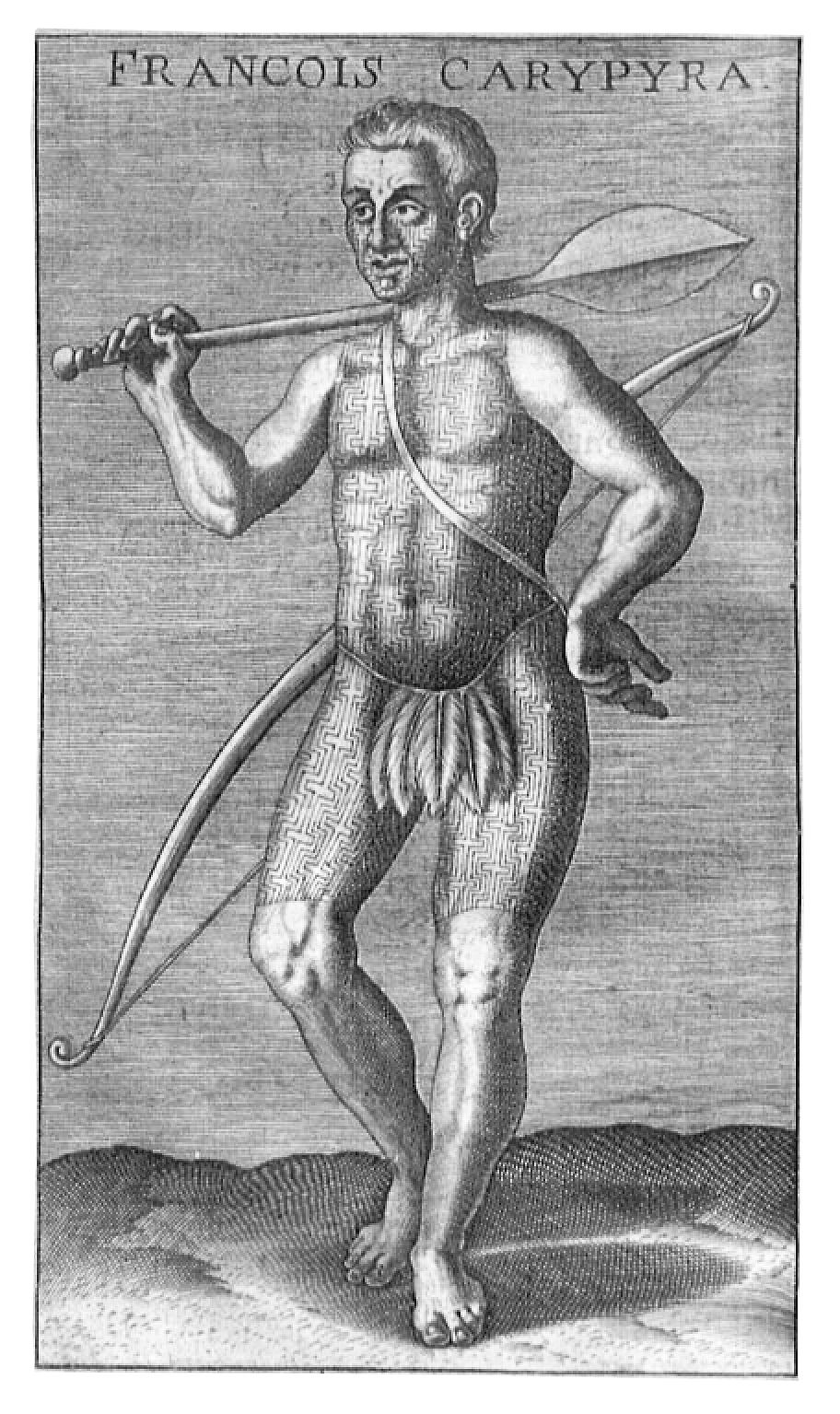
Warrior of the Tabajara tribe.

During the late 15th and early 16th centuries, Europe experienced the transition from the Middle Ages to the Modern Era, characterized by the maritime expeditions, globalization, mercantilism, colonialism and the expansion of Christianity. The Kingdom of Portugal, with its advanced nautical art, was a pioneer in establishing a colonial empire with the explorations of the Madeira (1419), the Azores (1427), the African coast (1434) and the sea route to India (1498). Between 1492 and 1502, the Kingdom of Castile explored America with Christopher Columbus and made the first circumnavigation of the world, begun by Ferdinand Magellan and completed by Juan Sebastián Elcano between 1519 and 1522.

In 1494, the kingdoms of Portugal and Castile signed the Treaty of Tordesillas to divide the lands "discovered and undiscovered" by both outside Europe. These explorations led to numerous naval expeditions in the Atlantic, Indian and Pacific Oceans and land excursions in the Americas, Asia, Africa and Australia until the end of the 19th century. The Spanish navigator and explorer Vicente Yáñez Pinzón was the first to land on Brazilian territory, reaching Cape Santo Agostinho in Pernambuco on January 26, 1500. Pedro Álvares Cabral, captain of a Portuguese expedition traveling to the Indies, arrived in Porto Seguro in Bahia on April 22 of the same year and claimed sovereignty over the territory, which he called the Ilha de Santa Cruz, for the Kingdom of Portugal. The French privateers were also prominent among the Europeans who visited Brazilian beaches from the southeast to the northeast from the beginning of the 16th century.

==== The natives ====
At the beginning of the 15th century, between 2.5 and 3.5 million indigenous people, divided into four linguistic and cultural groups, lived in Brazil: Tupi, Jê, Arawak and Kalinago. Most of the tribes encountered by the Europeans on the coast belonged to the Tupi trunk, who had expelled the non-Tupi tribes to the hinterland. Overall, the tribes were traditional communities formed by individuals whose villages occupied a contiguous area, spoke the same language, had the same habits and a sense of unity. As it grew, each group divided into a new autonomous unit that became increasingly differentiated and hostile as it spread apart.

The tribes had a warrior chief, an ordinary man who was assigned command only in cases of war. There was also a leader for the religious ceremonies with great influence over the group known as the pajé and caraiba, who attended to the sick with medicinal herbs and magic. There were no slaves or dominant social strata and everyone worked equally to survive. The indigenous people had no written language, used rudimentary techniques to obtain their means of subsistence and the exploitation of natural resources was limited. Agricultural activity was carried out almost exclusively on forest land, where they cleared the fields with their stone axes and burned the land to grow cotton, yams, beans, corn, manioc, sweet potatoes, pumpkins, peppers, tobacco and other plants, as well as fruit trees such as cashews and pequi. Each group lived in permanent war against the others within its area of expansion, even with those from the same cultural background.

=== Pre-colonialism ===
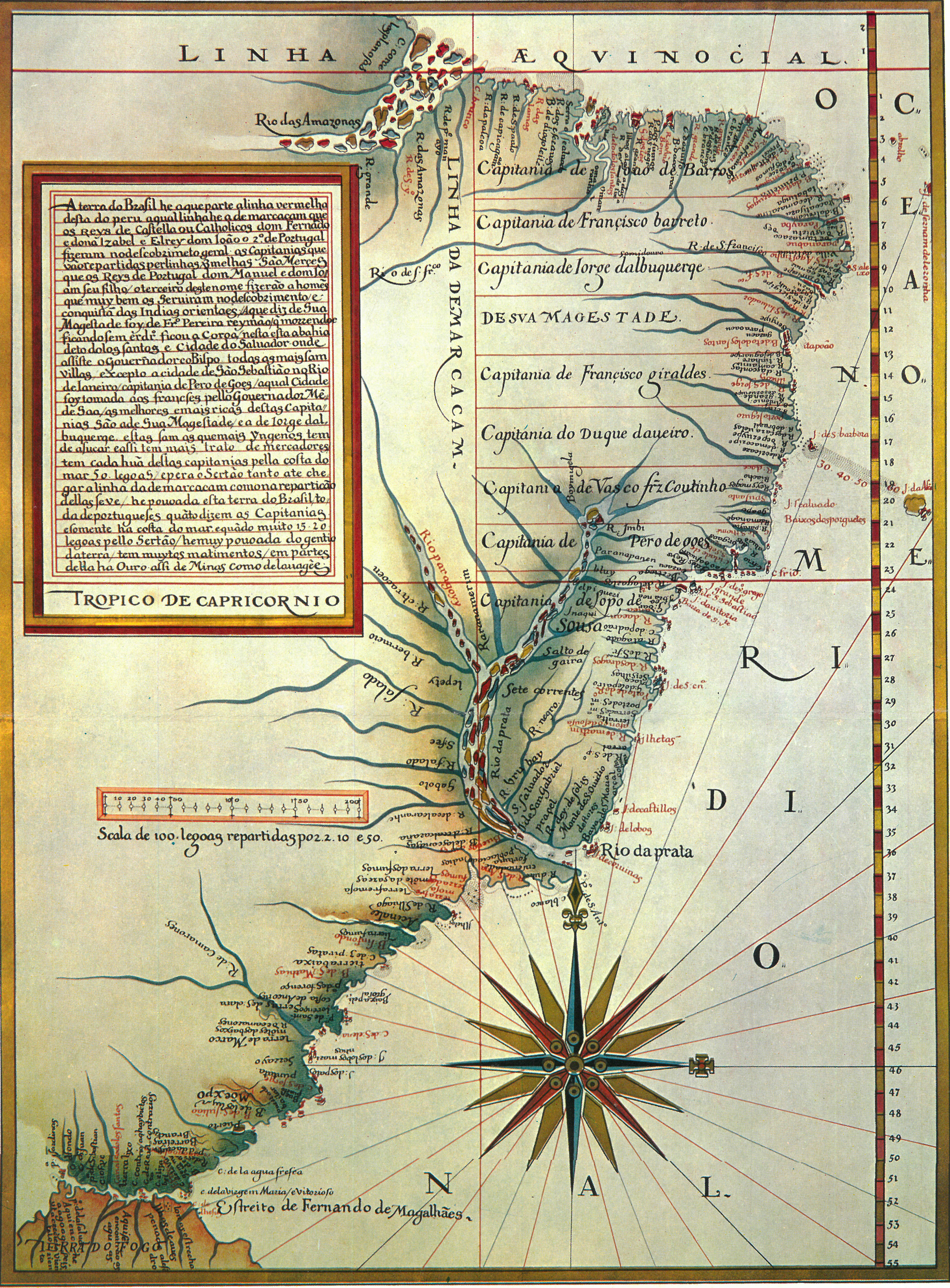
Map by Luís Teixeira (c. 1574) with the division of Portuguese America into captaincies.

Despite the discovery of the New World, Portuguese interests were focused on the lucrative spice trade with the East Indies. On February 16, 1504, the King of Portugal, Manuel I, donated the Captaincy of São João (now Fernando de Noronha) to Fernão de Loronha to explore brazilwood. The structures were limited to factories, temporary constructions where friendly relations were formed with the natives, whose permanence depended on the stability of these relations, enemy attacks and profits from trade.

They were simple fortifications staffed by a few men used mainly to store brazilwood and to supply the ships that arrived to collect it; all the workforce was formed by indigenous allies. Exploratory expeditions were sent by the navigators Gaspar de Lemos in 1501 and Gonçalo Coelho in 1503, who surveyed the Brazilian coastline and described its geographical features. The extraction of brazilwood was short-lived, as this type of tree was quickly exhausted and did not generate permanent settlements. Portugal's lack of interest in the American continent allowed other nations to visit the Brazilian coast, such as the English, Dutch, Spanish and French.

==== The relationship between the natives and the Europeans ====
In the early decades, small settlements composed mainly of convicts, corsairs, smugglers, deserters and occupants of the small factories emerged on the Brazilian coast. (Note: The degraded who were sent in greater numbers after the implementation of the Hereditary Captaincies in 1534 were largely responsible for the adaptation of foreigners to the physical reality of Brazil. They exploited the land's natural resources, captured indigenous people to sell as slaves, adopted the natives' customs and diet and learned everything they could from them.) Initially, the European conquerors perceived their relationship with the natives as a commercial alliance based on the barter practice, in which objects of limited value (knives, scythes, axes, glass necklaces, textiles and others) were exchanged for brazilwood, cotton and exotic species such as monkeys and parrots. The Portuguese practiced "cunhadismo", an indigenous custom used to incorporate strangers into their society, which consisted of forming a union between a native woman and a European man. It served as an effective and extensive way of recruiting workforce to cut and transport brazilwood to the factories and ships, hunt and gather food and capture prisoners. "Cunhadismo" was the basis of the miscegenation that formed the Brazilian population, allowing foreigners to form units apart from the villages, composed of multiple indigenous wives and their countless children. One of these groups was in the Captaincy of Bahia and was formed by Diogo Álvares Correia, known as Caramuru, and his large indigenous family.

=== Hereditary captaincies and colonialism ===
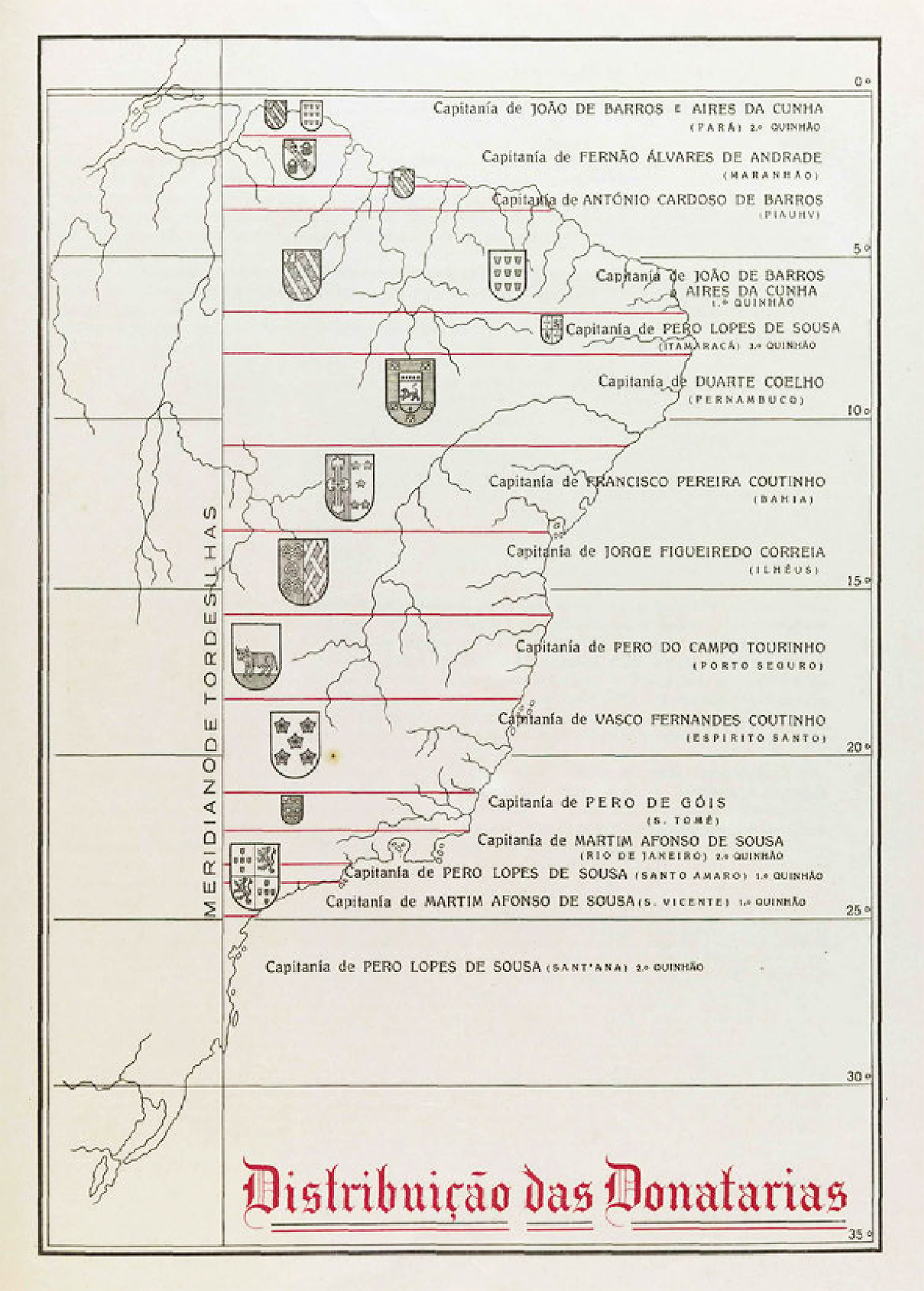
Map of the first captaincies.

In 1534, Portugal implemented the system of Hereditary Captaincies to avoid possible invasions, especially from the French. Fourteen territories divided into 15 lots were distributed to 12 small noblemen, as many Portuguese wealthy men were not interested in the region, considering that the only source of wealth confirmed at that point was brazilwood, reserved for exploitation by the Crown. Four of the donatários never came to Brazil to take possession of their lands.

After the implementation of the Hereditary Captaincies, relations between indigenous peoples and settlers in the current state of Paraíba changed due to the conflicting interests and the intensification of the colonization process. The Portuguese were concerned with keeping an alliance with the tribes in order for them to join their battle against European enemies (the French, Dutch and Spanish) and other hostile indigenous peoples in the expansion of their frontiers (the Tapuia). Both the Portuguese and the French maintained friendly policies with the natives who occupied the regions of the current state of Paraíba, such as the Potiguara, inhabitants of the coast and the first to have contact with the colonizers, and the Tabajara, who left the hinterlands of the current Northeast region for the lands occupied along the Paraíba do Norte River.

During the process of conquest and colonization of Brazil by the Portuguese, the different indigenous ethno-linguistic groups such as the Tamoio, Tupiniquim, Aimoré and Goitacá were generally reduced to two large groups: the Tupi (considered tame) and the Tapuia (considered untamed). The relations of alliance or hostility between the native tribes and the foreigners also depended on their own objectives and interests linked to the dynamics of their social organizations. For both groups, the arrival of the Europeans brought incalculable damage such as epidemics, high mortality, mass enslavement, intensification of intertribal wars, slave labor and social and cultural disruption. As allies or enemies, the Europeans became part of the inter-tribal relations of the various Tupi groups, who associated with different groups (Portuguese, French, Dutch), according to circumstances and their interests. The Tupi language, also known as the "common language", was used by foreigners to communicate with the majority of natives on the Brazilian coast.

In geographical terms, the history of Paraíba includes the captaincies of Itamaracá and Rio Grande, part of the area that forms present-day Paraíba, and the captaincies of Pernambuco and Bahia, also decisive contributors to its formation.

==== Captaincy of Rio Grande ====
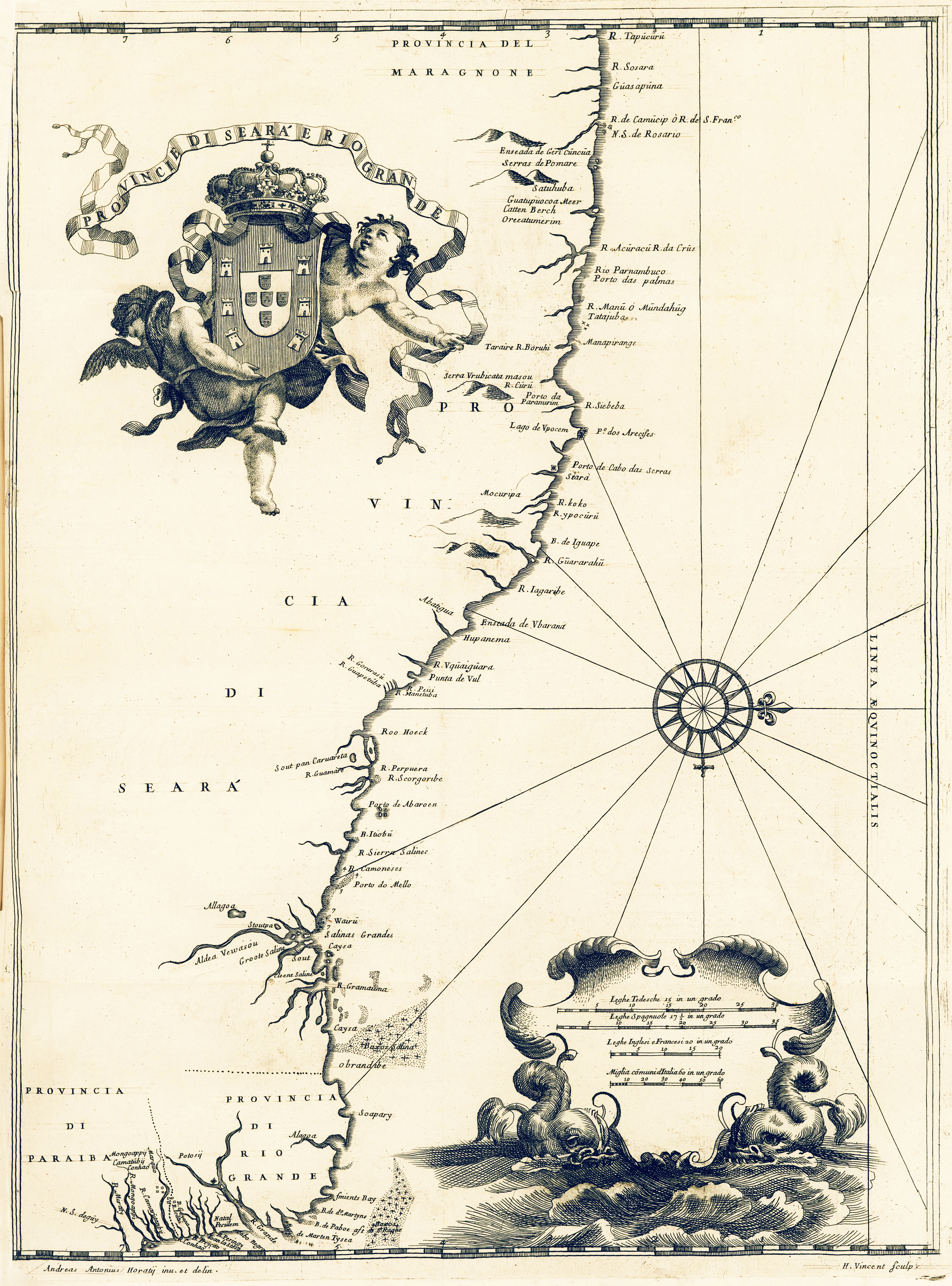
Captaincies of Ceará and Rio Grande (1698).

In November 1535, a fleet of ten ships with 900 men and over a hundred horses commanded by Aires da Cunha, a warrior experienced in the conquests of the Orient set sail from the Tagus for Brazil. João de Barros, Aires' partner, sent two of his sons to represent him on the expedition. The fleet first headed for the Captaincy of Pernambuco, where Duarte Coelho welcomed the explorers and provided them with information and interpreters, as well as a rowing boat to precede the squad and survey the coast.

The squad explored the coast with the goal of reaching the mouth of the Amazon River, probably in search of gold, abundant in the areas. After reaching Cape São Roque, the rowing boat provided by Duarte Coelho disappeared and the ship Capitania sank, killing Aires da Cunha. However, the remaining boats reached the estuary and landed on the Trindade Island. There they built a castle and established a colony which they named Nazareth. For about three years, they explored the surrounding lands in search of gold, sailing about two hundred and fifty leagues upriver and creating two more settlements.

However, the explorers failed to find gold and were constantly attacked by the Potiguara, which led them to return to Portugal. On the way, three ships were blown by contrary winds and ended up in the Antilles, where they were taken prisoner by the Spanish. Around 1550, João de Barros tried again to colonize his captaincy, arming a fleet with his two sons, but the Potiguara and the French offered fierce resistance. In 1554, Luís de Melo da Silva tried to explore the region with three ships, but he sank. Later, the government of Pernambuco used the abandoned areas of these captaincies to expand its territory, expelling the French from Maranhão, founding the city of Belém and attacking the English in the Amazon.

==== Captaincy of Itamaracá ====
In 1534, the Captaincy of Itamaracá was given to Pero Lopes de Sousa, but he left the territory in the charge of Francisco de Braga, who had previously been responsible for the factories of Igarassu and the Itamaracá Fort, spoke Tupi and had a good relationship with the indigenous people and the small local population. In 1535, Braga and some associates went to the site of the French fort and founded the village of Nossa Senhora da Conceição (now Vila Velha). When Duarte Coelho arrived, Francisco de Braga had been living in the region for three years.

==== Captaincy of Pernambuco (New Lusitania) ====
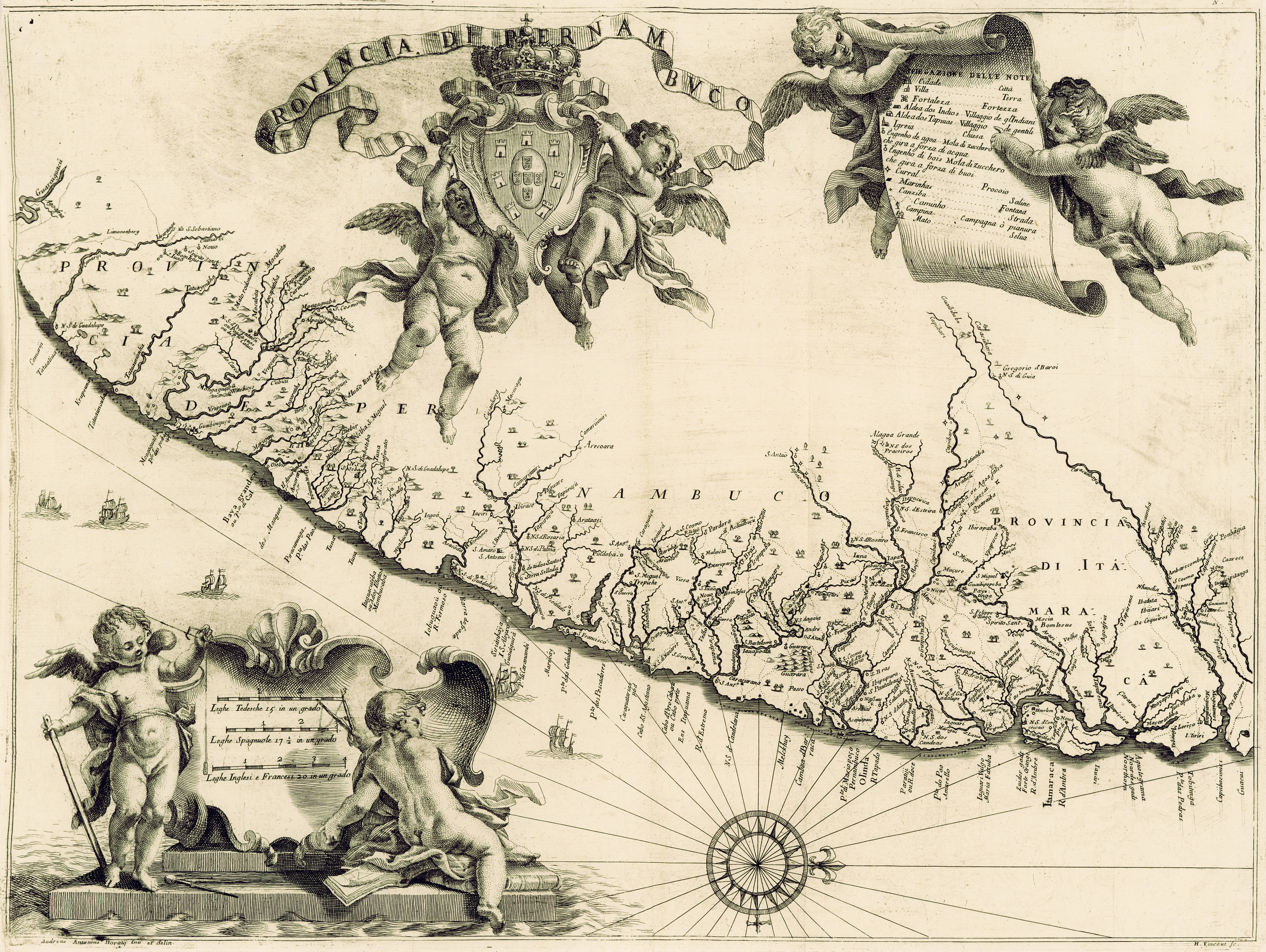
Captaincies of Pernambuco and Itamaracá (1698).

Duarte Coelho, donatário of the Captaincy of Pernambuco, left Portugal in October 1534 and arrived at the mouth of the Igarassu River on March 9, 1535, landing at Reduto dos Marcos. The site of the Igarassu factory was ideal because it ensured a peaceful occupation due to the long coexistence between the indigenous people and those who lived there. There, on September 27, 1535, he founded the village of Cosme e Damião. After its foundation, he organized an expedition and found a site near a beach protected by a barrier reef with narrow openings that he considered strategic and easily defensible. However, the place was occupied by a village of Caeté indigenous people, who were expelled after a violent battle.

In January 1536, Duarte Coelho moved to the area, leaving the village of Cosme e Damião under the command of his lieutenant, Afonso Gonçalves. There, Aires da Cunha's expedition met up with Duarte Coelho, who was involved in building the town that would become Olinda, the future seat of his captaincy. In 1540, Duarte Coelho went to Portugal to raise funds for the construction of mills in his territory, returning in September of the following year and bringing with him specialized labour and plant seedlings from the Canary Islands.

At the beginning of 1542, Duarte Coelho began building the first of five mills on the banks of the Beberibe River, near Olinda. On August 7, 1554, he died in Lisbon. His successor, Jorge de Albuquerque Coelho, expanded the area of European presence by attacking the indigenous groups between the area of the Várzea do Capibaribe and the mouth of the São Francisco River. The massacre of the native populations cleared the way for the installation of more sugar mills.

==== Captaincy of Baía de Todos os Santos ====
In 1536, the donatário Francisco Pereira Coutinho arrived in Todos os Santos Bay, whose territory offered favorable circumstances for colonization with a wide and safe anchorage and was frequented since 1501 by Portuguese exploration and trade fleets, Spanish navigators and French corsairs. He founded a factory, built a fortification by the sea and formed a settlement in the place known as Vila Velha with the help of the people who had lived there for a long time, including Diogo Álvares, with his sons and sons-in-law. In the early years, the settlement lived in peace with the indigenous people and the settlers were able to plant their crops. However, as they moved further into the hinterland and built two new mills, the Tupinambá rebelled, attacking and destroying the mills and the crops. In 1545, surrounded in his fortification and with his water and food supplies blocked by the natives, Francisco Pereira Coutinho took refuge in the Captaincy of Porto Seguro. After Diogo Álvares signed a peace pact between Fernando Coutinho and the rebellious natives, he decided to return to take possession of his castle, but contrary winds threw his ships onto the coast of the Itaparica Island, where he was devoured by the Tupinambá.

==== Captains, settlers, indigenous people and conflicts ====
As the captaincies developed, relations between the indigenous people and the colonizers began to deteriorate. Among the factors that disrupted these relations, the most important were: the growth of the colonies and their increased need for food; the development of sugar cane plantations and mills that expanded from the coast into the hinterland, threatening and violating the territories occupied by the indigenous villages; the new compulsory labor relations imposed by the Portuguese, which meant the neglect of the indigenous agricultural production system, essential for the survival of the villages; the increased demands for a cultural transformation of the natives in order to adapt them to compulsory labor; the perception by the natives that, instead of being allies to fight their enemies, they had become captors and slavers, and their opponents an object of exchange, which demeaned their cultural values and religious beliefs; and the realization by the natives that the prohibition on attacking the Portuguese and their settlements did not prevent the settlers from attacking their villages in search of slave labor, in a clear disregard for the marriage agreement between them. Conflicts also occurred, not only between the indigenous people and the settlers, but also between the settlers and the donatários. Disputes escalated in the mid-1540s, culminating in the revolts in Bahia in 1545, São Thomé in 1546, Espírito Santo in 1546 and Porto Seguro in 1546.

=== Governorate General of Brazil (1549-1572) ===
On January 7, 1549, John III, King of Portugal, appointed Tomé de Sousa as governor-general of Brazil and captain-major of the Captaincy of Bahia. Besides the donatário, the new system created two positions subordinate to the governor-general with specific functions: the ouvidor-geral (English: ombudsman-general), responsible for exercising judicial functions, unifying laws and rules and re-establishing order among the captaincies, and the provedor-mor (provider-major), responsible for overseeing and reviewing the accounts and decisions made by the clerks and accountants, his subordinates in the administration of the colony's finances.

=== Repartition of Brazil (1572-1577) ===
After Mem de Sá's death in March 1572, the Kingdom of Portugal implemented a new administrative system based on the division of the colony into the Northern Government, with its capital in Salvador and ruled by Luís de Brito e Almeida, and the Southern Government, headquartered in Rio de Janeiro and headed by Antônio Salema. The purpose of the administrative division was to reduce the distance between the administrative government and the captaincies and improve the defense of the colony and its settlements.

==== Attack on the Tracunhaém Mill ====
In 1574, during an incident known as the Tragedy of Tracunhaém, an indigenous woman named Iratembé, daughter of the chief Ininguaçú, married to a mameluco and escaped with her husband to Olinda. Her brothers set out to capture her and found Antonio Salema visiting the city, who ordered Iratambé's immediate return and provided them with a safe-conduct to arrive at the village without difficulty. However, when they stopped for the night at the Tracunhaém Mill, they were received by Diogo Dias, the plantation owner, who kidnapped Iratembé in the middle of the night and refused to hand her over. The natives returned to the village and reported the incident to Ininguaçú, who sent emissaries to Pernambuco to complain to the authorities, but no action was taken. Instigated by the French, Ininguaçú gathered around 2,000 tribesmen from Paraíba and Rio Grande do Norte and attacked the mill, killing all the inhabitants - owners, settlers and slaves. The group also attacked and set fire to mills in the Captaincy of Itamaracá, killing more than 600 people in total.

==== Paraíba River ====
Although the Captaincy of Itamaracá extended as far as the Traição Bay, its exploitation was not pursued by its donatários. Except for the region located on the banks of the Goiana River, the territory remained dominated by the Potiguara and the French, who trafficked in brazilwood. From 1560 onwards, the Potiguara wars, caused by the increase in the enslavement of indigenous people, and the fear that the French would settle on the Paraíba River, as had happened in Guanabara Bay, led Sebastian, the King of Portugal, to order Luís de Brito to conquer that area.

In 1574, Luís de Brito e Almeida, after hearing about the Tracunhaém incident, ordered Fernão da Silva, who was based in Pernambuco, to gather Portuguese and natives and conquer the Paraíba River. Upon arriving there, he claimed possession of the lands of Paraíba in the name of the Kingdom of Portugal. However, the expedition, threatened by the Potiguara, had to flee across the beach and take refuge in Itamaracá.

Instigated by the residents of Itamaracá and Pernambuco, who were suffering constant attacks from the Potiguara, Luís de Brito organized a new expedition to conquer the river. In 1575, he gathered an army of 15 ships in Bahia, under the command of his nephew, Bernardo Pimentel d'Almeida, and set sail for the Paraíba River, but the rough sea and contrary winds dispersed the fleet; some ships, including Luís de Brito's, returned to Bahia. Bernardo Pimentel d'Almeida's ship and others anchored in Pernambuco, but tired of waiting, headed back to Bahia. The unsuccessful and expensive expeditions made Luís de Brito e Almeida abandon the plans to conquer and settle Paraíba. The Potiguara and the French, motivated by their successive victories, intensified their incursions into the territory of the Captaincy of Itamaracá, extending their domains as far as the border of the Captaincy of Pernambuco on the other side of the Igarassú River, forcing the remaining settlers to take refuge on the Itamaracá Island.

=== Administration of Lourenço da Veiga (1577-1581) ===
At the beginning of his government, Veiga ordered the organization of an expedition to seize Paraíba, but abandoned it when he was informed that Frutuoso Barbosa, a wealthy brazilwood merchant who lived in Pernambuco, had offered to conquer and colonize the area in exchange for being the captain-major of the territory for ten years. Frutuoso Barbosa and his expedition composed of four ships, with relatives, families of settlers, religious of the Franciscan, Benedictine and Carmelite orders, soldiers, ammunition and other material means necessary for colonization, set sail from Lisbon in 1580. However, attacks by corsairs, storms and contrary winds dispersed the fleet; part ended up on the coast of Brazil and part, including Frutuoso's ship, in the West Indies. His wife died during the voyage and, after frustrating his initiative, he returned to Portugal. Also in 1579, during Veiga's rule, 11 French ships trading off the Brazilian coast of Dieppe and Le Havre were attacked and set on fire by Portuguese vessels; the survivors took refuge with the allied natives. On June 17, 1580, Diogo Lourenço da Veiga, who was ill, died in Baía.

=== Interim administration of Cosme Rangel de Macedo and Antônio Muniz Barreiros (1581-1583) ===
Before the Kingdom of Portugal appointed a replacement for Diogo Lourenço da Veiga, a board composed of the members of the Chamber of Deputies and Cosme Rangel de Macedo, ombudsman-general, took over the administration of Brazil. In 1582, Frutuoso Barbosa returned to Pernambuco under orders from Philip II, King of Spain and Portugal, to fulfill his part of the contract signed between him and the Crown. Supported by Simão Rodrigues Cardoso, ombudsman-general of Pernambuco, two hundred men and a troop of natives, Barbosa set out to conquer Paraíba by sea. When he reached the mouth of the Paraíba River, he found eight French ships, of which he set fire to five that were at anchor, while three others fled.

Encouraged by the victory, some of their relatives and Spanish soldiers landed, but as they approached the coast they were ambushed and more than forty men died, including Spanish nobles, soldiers, Portuguese and Frutuoso's son. The ships returned to the mouth of the river, where they awaited the arrival of Simões Rodrigues and his troops. In about 7 to 8 days, they fought and killed many Potiguara and spotted many enemies, leaving the camp and fleeing in a hurry to Pernambuco.

=== Administration of Manuel Teles Barreto (1583-1587) ===
Manuel Teles Barreto arrived in Salvador on May 9, 1583. In 1585, the Capuchin friars of the Order of Saint Anthony, including Friar Melchior de Santa Catarina, arrived in Pernambuco to establish convents in Brazil; the first to be built was that of Our Lady of the Snows, in Olinda. The most important responsibilities of his administration were to fortify the city, clear Paraíba of natives and Frenchmen and warn the captains of the entire coast against French, English and Dutch privateers.

==== The mission of Diego Flórez de Valdés ====
On September 25, 1581, the expedition commanded by Diego Flórez de Valdés left Seville, in Spain, with the mission of colonizing and fortifying both sides of the Strait of Magellan, and Pedro Sarmiento de Gamboa to govern the settlements. The other goal of the mission was to rescue Brazil from French and English invasions. The expedition, composed of twenty-three ships, settlers and five thousand men of sea and war, faced a serious storm in Cádiz which destroyed part of the fleet. The expedition with only 15 boats arrived in Rio de Janeiro on March 25, 1582, and was received by Salvador Correia de Sá and Father Joseph of Anchieta. There were many sick people, who were treated in a hospital that José de Anchieta set up at the base of Morro do Castelo, which would later become the Santa Casa de Misericórdia.

Leaving Rio de Janeiro on November 2, 1582, Flórez de Valdés headed for the Strait of Magellan, but storms and contrary winds destroyed two ships and damaged a third, forcing him to dock on the Santa Catarina Island. On his way to the La Plata River, he encountered a boat that reported it had been plundered by three English ships with plenty of ammunition and instruments of war. Unaware of the destination of the English, Flórez de Valdés divided his fleet into three. The largest ships, with six hundred men, headed for São Vicente and Rio de Janeiro with the settlers and their families on board; three vessels left for the La Plata River and the remaining fleet headed for the Strait of Magellan. There, they explored the region, but were delayed by bad weather and returned to Brazil, arriving in São Vicente on April 15, 1583, without fulfilling their mission. In São Vicente, Flórez de Valdés ordered the royal engineer Giovanni Battista Antonelli to build a fort at the mouth at the entrance to São Vicente. Valdés left for Salvador on June 2, 1583.

==== Conquest of Paraíba ====
After landing in Salvador, Flórez de Valdés discussed the conquest of Paraíba with Manuel Teles Barreto, governor-general, and Martim Leitão, ombudsman-general. On March 1, 1584, his fleet and two other galleons left for Pernambuco to organize forces for the expedition. Besides Martim Leitão, the squad was joined by Martim Carvalho and Frutuoso Barbosa. While the land forces struggled to reach their destination and faced little resistance, Flórez de Valdés arrived in Paraíba and found six French ships near a fort; het fire to five ships, let one escape and destroyed the structure. At the end of the battle, they encountered the land troops. Flórez ordered a fort to be built on the left bank of the mouth of the Paraiba River, opposite the tip of Restinga Island, contradicting Frutuoso Barbosa. On May 1, 1584, the day of his departure for Spain, he assigned Francisco de Castrejón to command the fort, providing it with a hundred and ten Spanish arquebusiers, a galleon and two pataches, appointed Frutuoso Barbosa as the governor of the future settlement and named the fort São Filipe in honor of King Philip II.

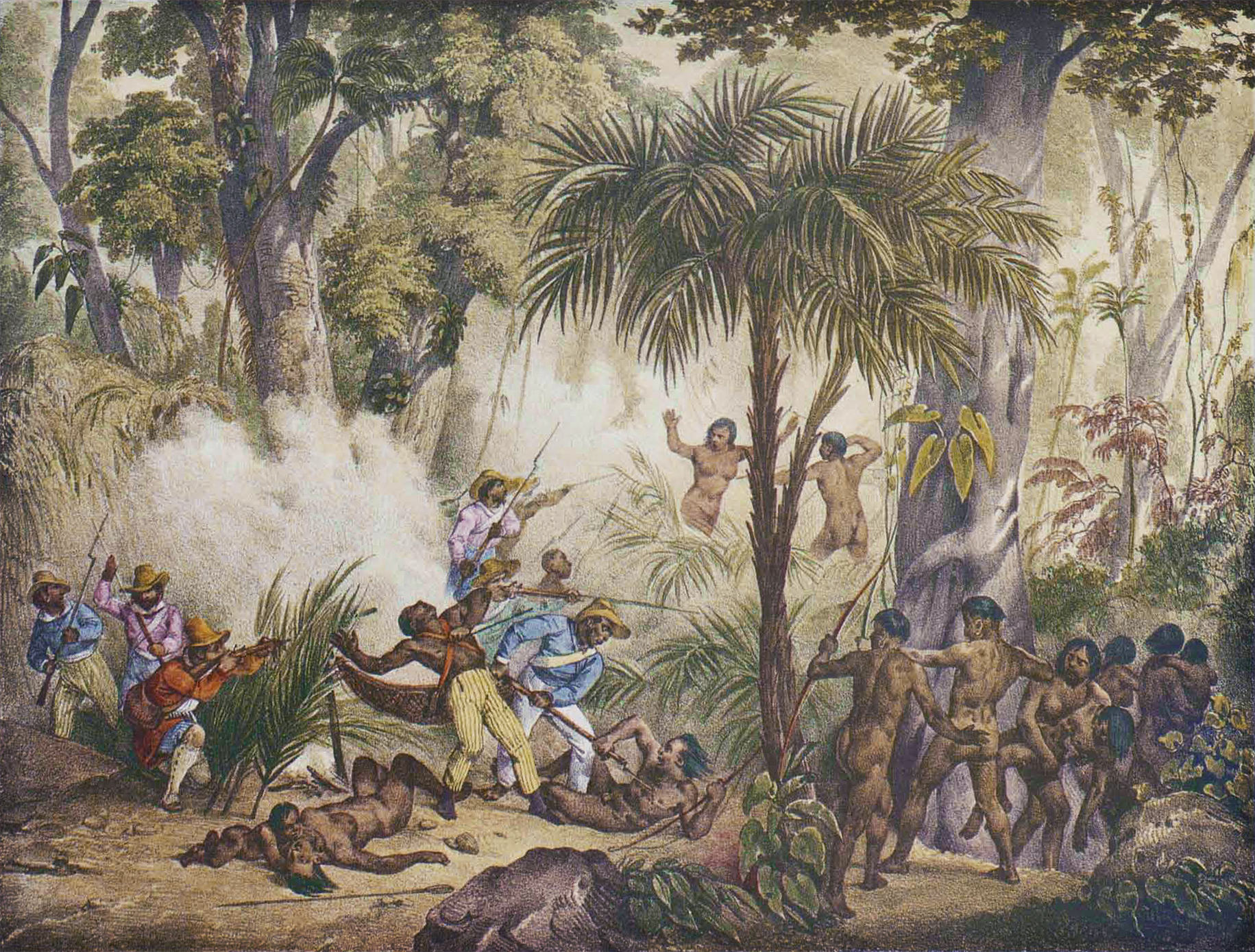
Guerillas - Johann Moritz Rugendas (1835).

Over the next few months, the soldiers based in the fort fought against the natives, hunger, the lack of weapons and ammunition, disease due to the lack of drinking water and also against themselves. Martim Leitão, who had remained in Pernambuco and was supported by the governors of the captaincies of Itamaracá and Pernambuco and their residents, believed that it was necessary to preserve everything that had been conquered. In November 1584, two French ships anchored three leagues away from Traição Bay and, together with the Potiguara, attacked the structure using European war tactics. Castrejón and Barbosa sent urgent requests to Martim Leitão, who arranged for two ships with men, weapons, ammunition and supplies, at his own expense, to reach the fort. Pero Lopes Lobo and Gaspar Dias de Moraes set sail in four days and, arriving at Paraíba, joined Castrejón's boat, set fire to the French vessels they found anchored and repelled the Potiguara.

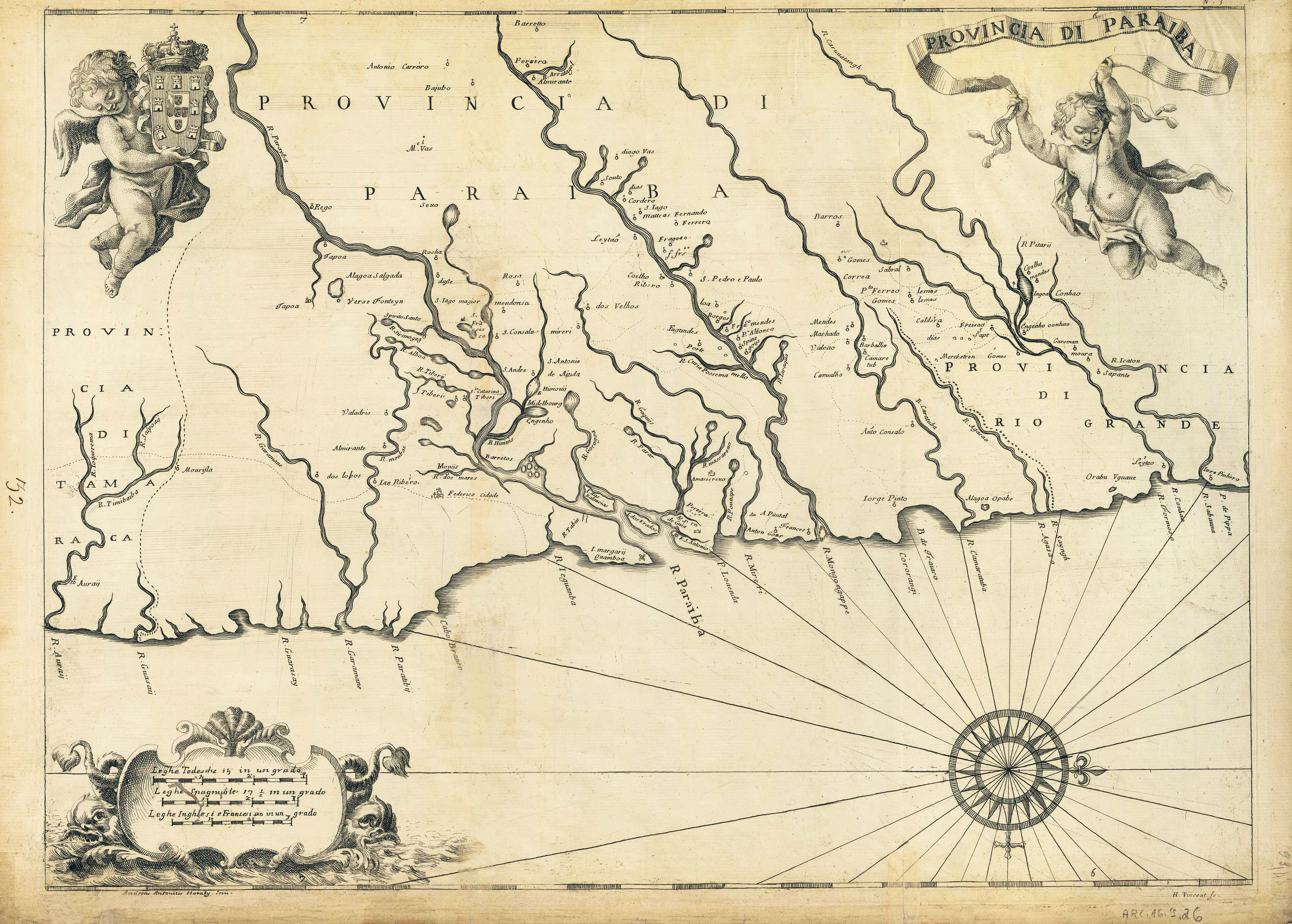
Map of the Captaincy of Paraíba (1698).

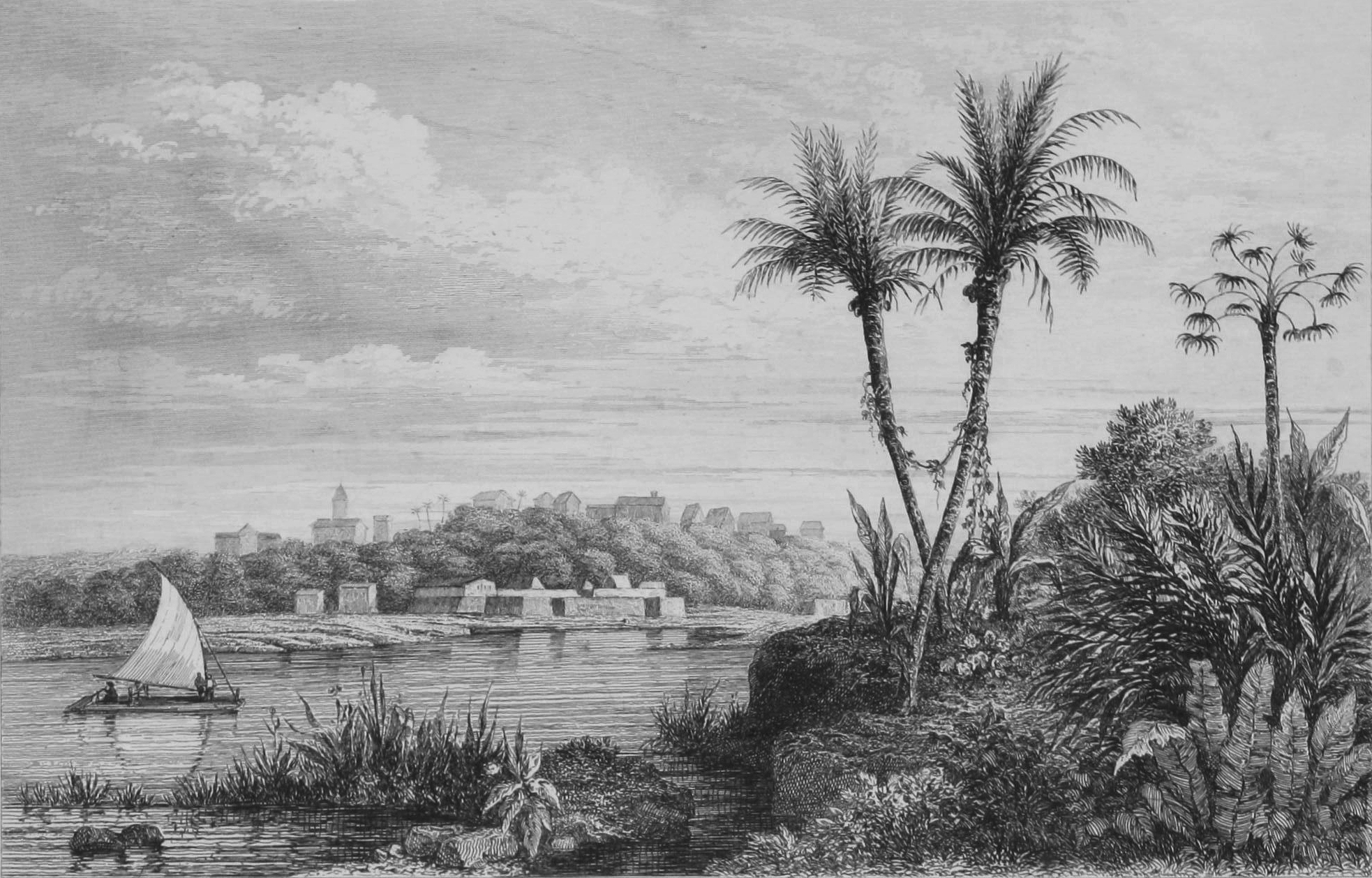
Former village of Parahyba.

In January 1585, a large number of Potiguara and Tabajara occupied the fort, marching out at night with three mobile palisades built from thick palm trunks to protect them from the artillery. Castrejón asked for urgent help from Olinda, which was alarmed to hear that Pirajibe and his tribe had joined forces with the Potiguara of Paraíba. On February 14, the City Council officials, the Procurator Martim Carvalho and the Bishop and Captain of Pernambuco D. Filippe gathered together and asked Martim Leitão to command the project, given its importance and urgency. In a joint effort by the captaincies, a large army left for Paraíba before the end of February.

On March 6, Francisco Barreto came across a settlement of around three thousand natives on the banks of the Tibiri River, where Pirajibe lived. Attacking by surprise, he killed many of the natives before they could react and forced the rest to flee. The next morning, Martim Leitão, recognizing that the Tabajara were from the Pirajibe tribe, sent a messenger in an attempt to recruit them to his side. They fought with the Pirajibe and Guirajibe tribes all the way to the tip of Cabedelo, where they crossed the river in boats. When he reached the fort, all the enemy had been defeated. After a successful raid to Reritiba, Martim Leitão decided to return to Olinda, leaving behind only Pero Lopes Lobo and a few men with the rest of Castrejón's troops, replacing Frutuoso Barbosa who had renounced his claims to those lands.

In June 1585, Pero Lopes Lobo and Castrejón burned the fort, sank the ship, threw the cannons into the sea and returned to Olinda. Castrejón, accused of insubordination and negligence, was arrested and sent to the Royal Court, where he was acquitted. In July, Martim Leitão received two natives from the Pirajibe tribe who asked for help as their village had been cornered. He sent João Tavares to negotiate, who met with Pirajibe and other chiefs to agree the terms of peace between the Tabajara and the Portuguese. João Tavares returned to the captaincy with peace signed with the tribe on August 5, 1585, day of Our Lady of the Snows.

Martim Leitão arrived in Paraíba on October 29, 1585, with carpenters and masons to build a fort and start his settlement. After exploring the surrounding area with Manuel Fernandes, the King's master builder, he chose a hill near the natural wharf of the Sanhauá River (today's Varadouro district) for the future town. He chose the top of the hill for the chapel, built under the invocation of Our Lady of the Snows. There, the first city of Paraíba, called Nossa Senhora das Neves, would be built by the settlers in memory of the day when peace was sealed with the Tabajara. Next to the chapel, Martim laid the foundations of the fort and ordered mud houses to be built for the workers.

Martim Leitão left Cristovam Lins to conclude the work and ordered Pero Lopes, João Tavares and the others to fight the Potiguara in the Copaoba Hills. Uniting his troops and the Tabajara, he headed for Traição Bay to fight the French. After defeating them, they returned to Paraíba, where they saw the completion of the fort. Martim Leitão left for Pernambuco on January 20, 1586, leaving the structure under the command of João Tavares. At the end of February, captain Francisco de Moralles arrived in Pernambuco with 50 Spanish soldiers to take over the post at São Filipe Fort by royal decree. He sent the captain and his men to the Varadouro Fort with the recommendation that they remain under the obedience of João Tavares and await further orders from the Crown. When he arrived at the site in April 1586, Francisco de Moralles did not follow Martim Leitão's orders and, confronting João Tavares, expelled him from the fort along with the Portuguese forces, spontaneously taking over the command of the structure and the government of the captaincy.

In the following months, Martim received numerous complaints about Moralles from the inhabitants of Paraíba and the Tabajara. On September 27, he was informed that five heavily armed French ships had been sighted in Traição Bay planning to attack the fort with the Potiguara, and Moralles needed urgent help to fight them. Moralles and his men left the fort and headed for Pernambuco, where he remained until his return to Europe. On December 23, 1586, Martim Leitão and his men arrived at Nossa Senhora das Neves and left for the Copaoba Hills the following day, putting Pero de Albuquerque in command of the fort.

In Copaoba, when Pirajibe's troops and men arrived, they spotted more than 50 villages and vast cotton fields. When they attacked, they faced little resistance, as most of the men were helping the French to carry the brazilwood. The Potiguara and 150 Frenchmen returned and surrounded the Portuguese, who managed to destroy three more villages before breaking the siege and fleeing. Martim Leitão headed towards the coast in search of Tejucupapo, the leader, but on the way he came across a large palisade where the French were also located. A heavy battle ensued, leaving more than 47 wounded and three dead. Back in Paraíba, Martim Leitão sent two caravels to raid the French ships, but they had already left because they had burnt all the brazilwood. Subsequently, the Potiguara disappeared from Paraíba for a few years, taking refuge on the other side of the Rio Grande. On January 10, 1586, the first sesmaria of Paraíba, located near the mouth of the river of the same name, was registered.

=== Main administrators of the Captaincy of Paraíba ===
==== João Tavares (1586-1588) ====
João Tavares effectively became governor and captain-major of Paraíba at the end of 1586. In January 1587, Martim Leitão ordered the construction of the São Sebastião Fort on the banks of the Tibiri River, near the D'el Rei Mill, to protect the area. When the work on the fort was finished in February, Martim Leitão returned to Olinda and the settlement of Nossa Senhora das Neves began to form. The Jesuit priests, including Simão Travassos and Jerônimo Machado, built the Chapel of Saint Gundisalvus in rammed earth near the village of Pirajibe, in the area known today as Ilha do Bispo. During the government of João Tavares, spaces were successively occupied to form the settlement of Nossa Senhora das Neves.

The first street probably started at the top of the hill, where the Church of Our Lady of the Snows was built, and went down the slope towards Varadouro. Many families soon came to settle and occupy the first houses. João Tavares also established his conquest inland, developing agriculture, especially sugar cane cultivation and promoting the construction of new mills. Peace with the Tabajara was also extended to some Potiguara villages with the help of the Jesuits. He build other structures: the Diogo Nunes Fort, next to the Santo André Mill and the Restinga Fort, on the Restinga Island. In 1579, Frutuoso Barbosa, representing Pedro de la Cueva, had appealed to the Royal Court to recover his rights to the Captaincy of Paraíba. At the beginning of August 1588, João Tavares gave up his post.

==== Frutuoso Barbosa (1586-1588) ====
In August 1588, Frutuoso Barbosa was recognized as governor and captain-major of the Captaincy of Paraíba and the town of Nossa Senhora das Neves was recognized as the Royal City of Filipeia de Nossa Senhora das Neves. By the same decree, Pedro de La Cueva became captain of the Spanish soldiers and the forts in Paraíba. At the beginning of 1589, the Franciscan friars, who had been settled in Olinda since 1585, arrived in Paraíba. In the same year, Friar Melchior de Santa Catarina built the Convent of Saint Francis and then returned to Olinda. In 1589, Frutuoso Barbosa ordered the construction of the Cabedelo Fort, transferring the weapons from the Restinga Fort with the help of the Tabajara from Pirajibe tribe, who received payment and finished the work in October 1589.

The disagreements between La Cueva and Barbosa began immediately. Busy with their disagreements, they neglected the defense of the captaincy and, as a result, the Potiguara settled in Paraíba and attacked friendly farms and villages. In 1590, the captaincies of Itamaracá and Pernambuco, after a request for help from the settlers of Paraíba, sent a troop commanded by Pero Lopes Lobo who, joining forces with the men of La Cueva and the Tabajara of Pirajibe and Guarajibe tribes, managed to repel the invaders and destroy the nearby villages. Later, they went on to Copaoba Hills and Traição Bay, destroyed an indigenous fortification with little resistance and captured many women and children.

On his return, Pero Lopes made Barbosa and La Cueva shake hands as a sign of peace, but the disagreements between them continued. Once the battle was over, Barbosa ordered a fort to be built on the banks of the Inhobi River, in order to construct more mills in its vicinity, but La Cueva refused to help, claiming that there were no orders from the King Philip I regarding this. Barbosa asked the friars to instigate the natives to build it without receiving anything and appointed Pedro Coelho de Sousa as its captain. King Philip I, informed of the problems, ordered La Cueva to return to Portugal and, unable to bear the burden of the government of Paraíba, Frutuoso Barbosa resigned his post in 1591. At the same time, there were increasing disagreements between the Jesuits and Franciscans over the indoctrination of the allied indigenous villages and over political disagreements between the Kingdom and the Society of Jesus.

===== André de Albuquerque (1591-1592) =====
André de Albuquerque remained in office until the arrival of the new governor appointed by King Philip I. In 1591, he received authorization to build the Inhobi Fort and sent part of the men from the Cabedelo Fort to Inhobi. Cabedelo, being unguarded, suffered a major attack from the Potiguara and the French and was totally destroyed.

===== Feliciano Coelho de Carvalho (1592-1600) =====
Feliciano Coelho de Carvalho arrived in Paraíba at the end of 1591 and took office at the beginning of 1592. He summoned the Jesuits, the Franciscans and the respective chiefs of the tribes and ordered that the indigenous villages be relocated to improve the defenses of the territory. However, the Jesuits refused to accept that the settlers wanted to use the indigenous people as they pleased, an attitude that was contrary to that of the Franciscans, who supported everything. The sequence of events between the leaders of the orders, the inhabitants of Filipeia de Nossa Senhora das Neves and Coelho de Carvalho, who were more supportive of the Franciscans, resulted in the Jesuits leaving Paraíba in 1593. In 1595, the Benedictine monks arrived in Paraíba and France and Spain went to war, resulting in their colonies suffering more attacks from French and English pirates.

In the same year, an English squad with three ships commanded by the privateer James Lancaster and four by the pirate John Venner gathered at Cape Branco, but instead of attacking Paraíba, they went to Recife, where they bombarded the fort and took over the city, as the defenders retreated to Olinda. They stayed there for a month, looting freely and chartering several more French and Dutch ships to load everything they had taken. Meanwhile, Coelho de Carvalho kept busy attacking the local inhabitants and the French who were constantly trying to invade Paraíba and fighting with the Franciscans. In 1596, a French squad composed of 12 ships and 350 men of war attacked the Santa Catarina do Cabedelo Fort, which was bravely defended by just 20 men. Coelho de Carvalho, who was inland fighting the natives, heard the news and set off to return, but as he traveled along the coast, he came up against two Potiguara tribes together with the French. He defeated the natives and imprisoned the French.

The Kingdom of Portugal considered necessary to conquer and populate the Captaincy of Rio Grande, a stronghold of the French and the Potiguara, for the security of the Captaincy of Paraíba. A Royal Letter dated March 15, 1597 ordered Francisco de Sousa, governor-general of Brazil, and Feliciano Coelho de Carvalho to provide all the necessary means to Manuel Mascarenhas Homem, captain-major of Pernambuco, to occupy that region with a fortress and a colony. Francisco de Sousa sent a fleet of eleven ships commanded by Admiral Antonio da Costa Valente and Francisco de Barros Rego to meet the forces of Feliciano Coelho and Manuel Mascarenhas in Paraíba.

On December 17, 1597, the land forces, commanded by Coelho de Carvalho, and the naval force, commanded by Mascarenhas, departed to meet at the Potengi River (or Grande River). Near the Traição Bay, the land forces were infected by an epidemic of smallpox, which practically wiped out the troops and forced the rest to return to Paraíba. However, Jerônimo de Albuquerque, who was immune, boarded a caravel and continued his journey. The naval expedition arrived at the scheduled location and immediately began building the fort, but they were attacked by a large army of Potiguara and Frenchmen, whom they managed to repel. The arrival of new troops led overland by Coelho de Carvalho allowed them to complete the construction of Reis Fort.

When the structure was ready, Coelho de Carvalho and Mascarenhas returned and left Jerônimo de Albuquerque as its captain, who tried to make peace with the Potiguara using a shaman, his prisoner, called Ilha Grande. He brought Jerônimo together with the Potiguara chiefs, Zorobabé and Pau-Seco, with whom he achieved conciliation. Once the terms had been set, the agreement was celebrated at a ceremony in Filipeia attended by the governors of Paraíba and Pernambuco, on June 11, 1599. The conquest of the Captaincy of Rio Grande and the peace agreement with the Potiguara ushered in an era of peace and prosperity for Paraíba and also for the new colony.

== 17th century ==
The peaceful environment between 1600 and 1624 allowed the city of Filipeia to grow, its trade to increase and the frontiers of colonization to advance into the interior of the captaincy, with the construction of new sugar mills around the Paraíba River. Paraíba's trade consisted of exporting brazilwood and sugar and importing basic necessities and luxury goods. In addition to the sugar mills and food crops, cattle breeding was also beginning to develop.

=== Dutch invasions ===
In 1621, the Dutch created the Dutch West India Company (West-Indische Compagnie or WIC), which had a monopoly on the slave trade in the Netherlands. At the end of 1623, the WIC organized an expedition of twenty-three ships and three yachts with five hundred cannons, manned by one thousand six hundred sailors, to attack Bahia. In May 1624, 1,200 soldiers and 200 sailors attacked by sea and land. Salvador's troops fled and the Governor-General Diogo de Mendonça Furtado was arrested and sent to the Netherlands. Matias de Albuquerque, then governor of the Captaincy of Pernambuco, was elected governor-general and began to organize the colonists' resistance to the invasion. In 1625, Spain sent an squad of fifty-two ships with around twelve thousand men under the command of Fadrique de Toledo Osorio, Marquis of Villanueva de Valdueza, and Manuel de Meneses, who expelled the Dutch on May 1 of that year.

==== Attack on Cabedelo Fort ====
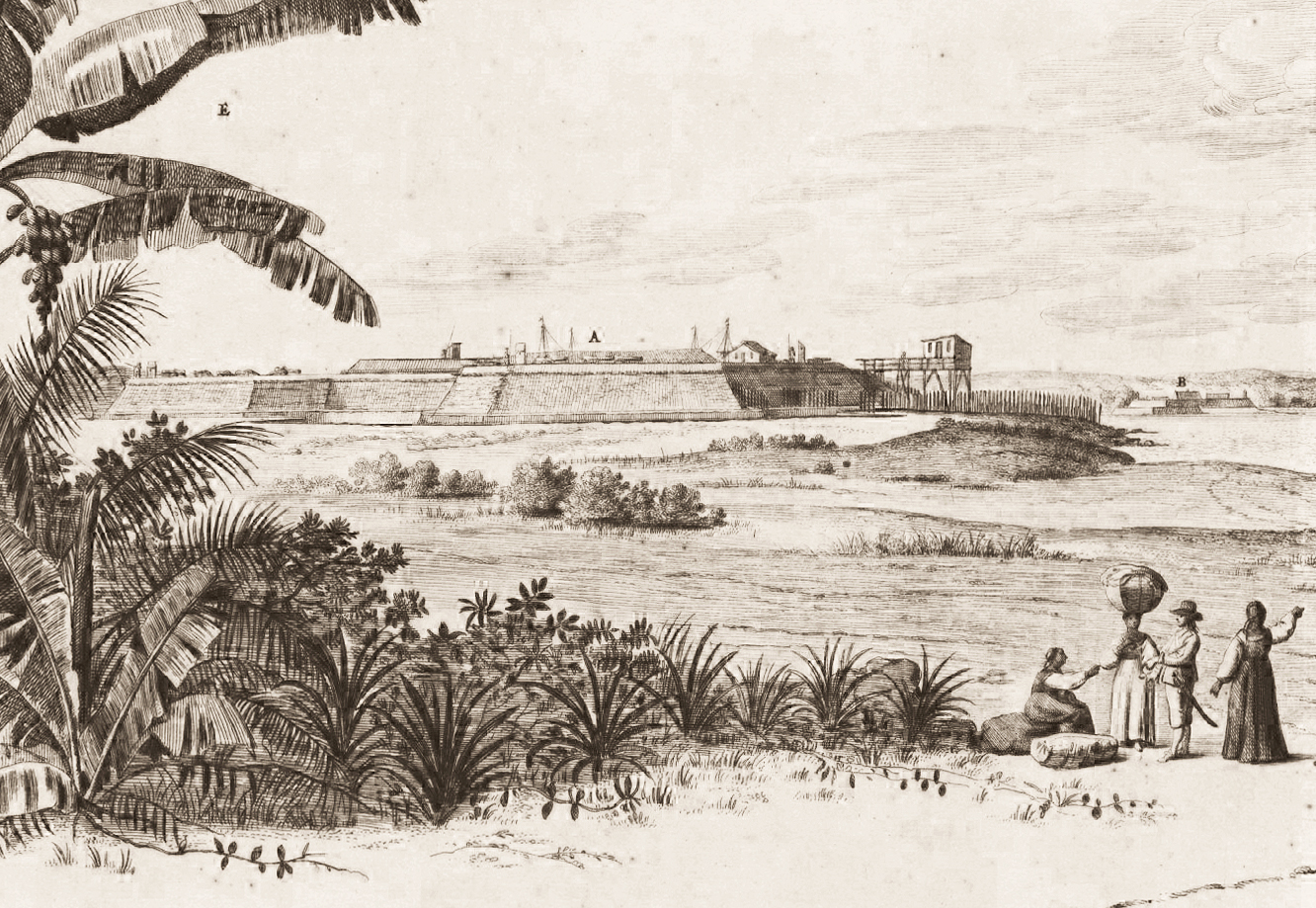
Detail of the Cabedelo and Santo Antônio Forts.

Hendrick Corneliszoon Lonck planned to attack Filipeia in 1629 if his mission to take Olinda went wrong. However, the Dutch conquered the city in 1630. In 1631, Antônio de Albuquerque Maranhão, concerned about defending the bar of the Paraíba River, ordered the construction of the São Sebastião Fort on the opposite bank to Cabedelo, in the present-day district of Costinha, in Lucena. He also had the Restinga Fort reinforced to form a defensive triangle.

In September 1731, a caravel loaded with weapons, ammunition and eight cannons arrived carrying a Portuguese company commanded by Captain Antônio Figueiredo de Vasconcelos, and a Spanish company commanded by Captain Manuel Godinho. On December 2, a Dutch fleet of 16 ships led by Lieutenant Colonel Stein-Callefels, with 1600 men commanded by Major Hugo-Wirich, left Recife for Paraíba and landed at Cape Branco on December 5. (Note: At the time, Cape Branco beach stretched along the entire coastline from present-day Cape Branco to Cabedelo. The Dutch landed in what is now the municipality of Cabedelo.) Antônio Albuquerque, expecting the arrival could occur at Cape Branco beach, had set up a defensive line there and tried to prevent the enemy from arriving. However, suffering heavy losses, he retreated to the Cabedelo Fort, allowing the Dutch to settle there. After six days of intense fighting trying to conquer the fort, the Dutch army realized that it had insufficient men for the task and decided to withdraw at dawn on December 12, 1631.

==== Attack on Santo Antônio Fort ====
In 1633, the Dutch conquered the captaincies of Itamaracá and Rio Grande. Pernambuco, led by Matias de Albuquerque, was still resisting the invaders using guerrilla tactics. Small groups of ten to forty men attacked the Dutch by surprise and quickly retreated, regrouping at Arraial do Bom Jesus, on the outskirts of Recife, where they were concentrated. As a result, they managed to keep the Dutch confined to the fort and the urban perimeter of Recife and Olinda. At the beginning of 1634, the Dutch, worried about the arrival of winter, decided to attack the town of Filipeia, in Paraíba, as they thought this was the easiest place to conquer with the forces they had. On February 24, 21 ships carrying 1500 men left Recife for Paraíba, divided into two units. The first brigade's mission was to invade the Paraíba River and take control of the Restinga Fort in order to block the passage of the river. The second brigade, on which the first was dependent, had the mission of conquering the Santo Antônio Fort, preventing it from attacking the first division.

On the 27th, the first group landed in the mouth of the Paraíba River, while the second headed for Lucena to disembark its troops. On land, 150 men commanded by Colonel Sigismund von Schkopp advanced along the narrow path that led to the fort, the only possible route since it was surrounded by mangroves on one side and the sea on the other. However, as they approached, their scouts spotted a trench with a palisade blocking the road, but Schkopp insisted on advancing, taking advantage of the night. Spotting the Dutch, Captain Domingos de Almeida's company and Simão Soares' indigenous troop began firing and launching arrows, leading them to retreat. The Dutch returned shortly afterwards, armed with axes and hoes to break down the palisade, but they were again repulsed. Schkopp decided to hide and wait for reinforcements to arrive, but Antônio de Albuquerque sent 500 men, including 200 natives, in boats through the mangroves, who attacked the Dutch from the rear. Losing many men, the Dutch had to flee in a hurry.

==== Surrender of Paraíba ====
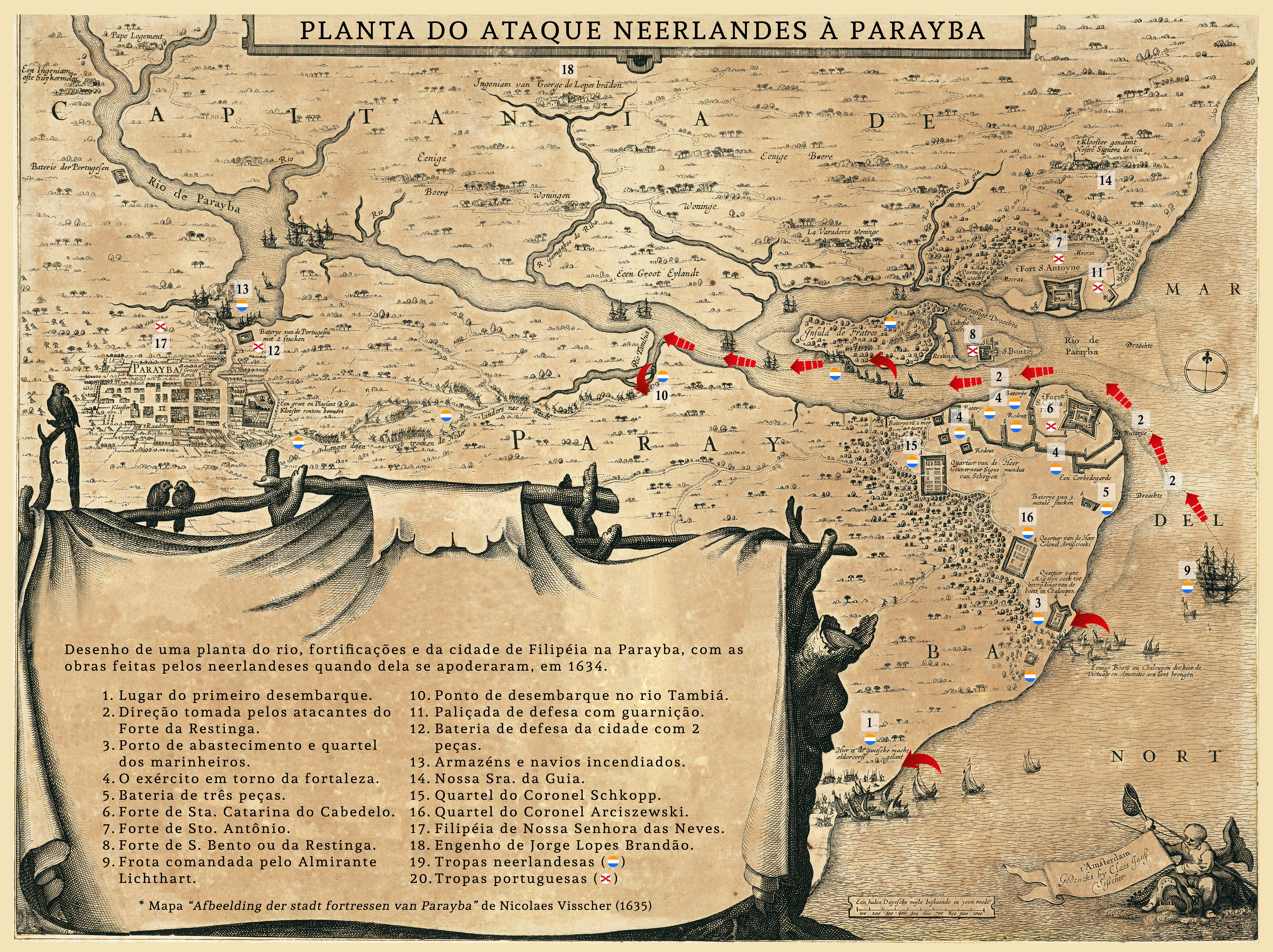
Map of the conquest of Paraíba.

Reinforced by troops from Europe under the command of Colonel Krzysztof Arciszewski and Colonel Schkopp, the Dutch had a total of 2,534 soldiers at their disposal to conquer Paraíba. On November 25, 1634, their fleet of 29 ships captained by Admiral Lichthart set sail from Recife for Paraíba, arriving off the coast of Cape Branco on December 4. Using yachts and sloops, they disembarked part of their troops in the Jaguaribe cove, far from Cabedelo, while three ships continued on with orders to anchor off the tip of Lucena. After receiving the news that the Dutch were landing in the cove, Antônio Albuquerque got together with the companies of Captains Gaspar de Valcaçar and Domingos de Arriaga and marched there. When they arrived, the Dutch had already disembarked 600 men who were positioned in three ranks facing the sea, the forest and the road ahead, where Albuquerque was coming, with one cannon each.

The battle took place in the Jaguaribe cove, but feeling outnumbered, Antônio de Albuquerque ordered a retreat. However, during the escape, some soldiers were captured by the Dutch and one, in exchange for his freedom, informed them of a road that led to Cabedelo Fort. On the 5th, Colonels Schkopp, with three troops, and Arciszewski, with two, each carrying a bronze cannon, advanced along the beach towards the fort. The Dutch's concern this time was not to attack, but to establish their camps. Captain Kaspar van der Ley was designated to follow the route indicated by the prisoner, taking three brigades with him, while the rest followed the river to the fort. Schkopp, ordering the ships to bring the necessary supplies, managed to set up three camps near the fort: one on the river, one on the beach and one on the indicated path.

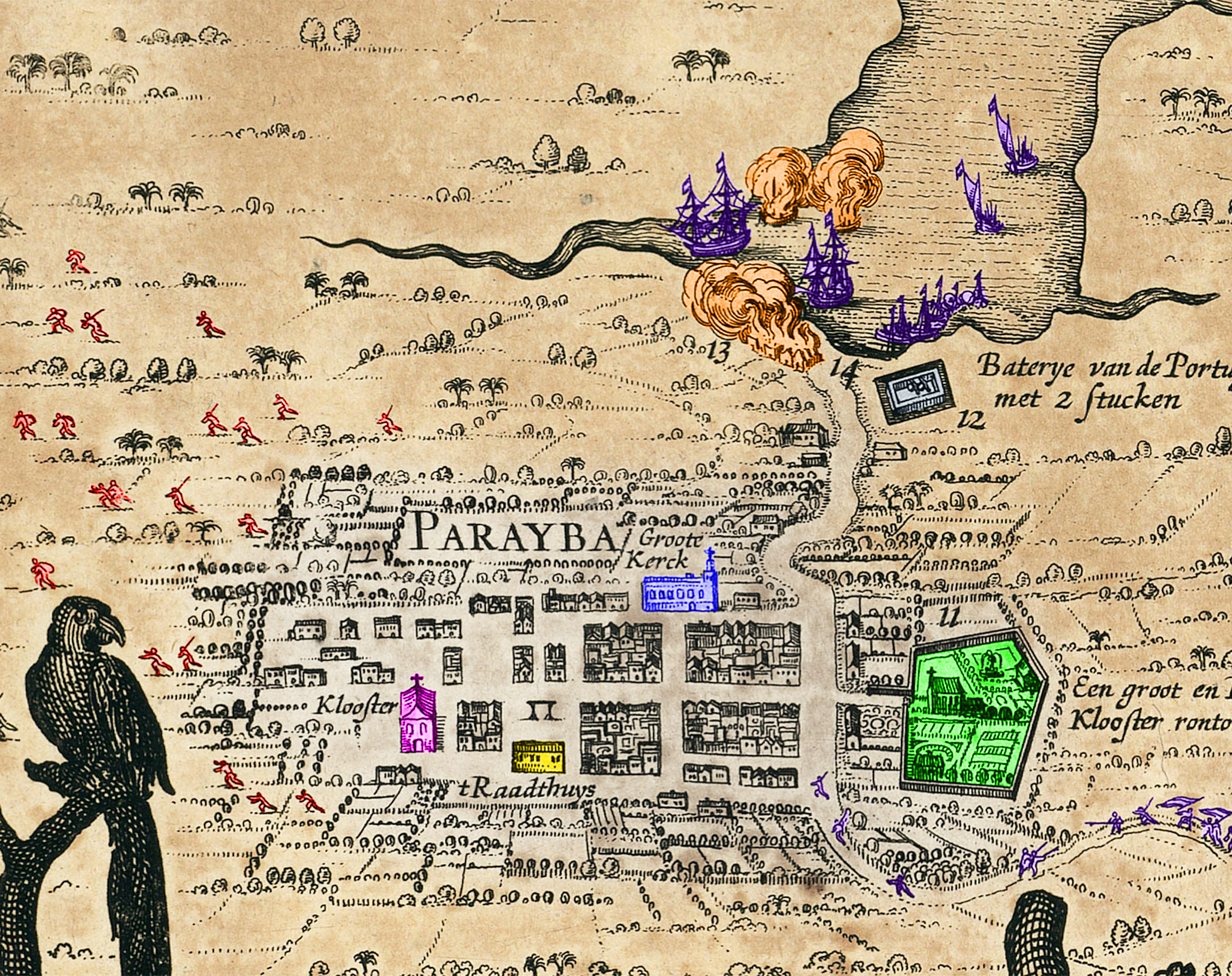
Detail of the city of Filipeia on the Afbeelding der stadt fortressen van Parayba map of Nicolaes Visscher (1635). * Dark blue - Cathedral Basilica of Our Lady of the Snows; * Pink - Monastery of St. Benedict; * Orange - Ships and warehouses burning at Varadouro dock; * Grey - Portuguese army with 2 cannons; * Yellow - Town Hall; * Green - Church and Convent of St. Anthony; * Purple - Arrival of the Dutch; * Red - Escape of Portuguese and settlers.

On the 7th, Antônio de Albuquerque ordered the forts of Cabedelo and Restinga to bombard the enemy bases and sent troops to attack them. On December 8, 1634, the yacht Kemp-haen arrived from Rio Grande with the news that the 300 men of Nhandui, the son of a chief of the Tarairiu tribe, who had been recruited by the WIC, were camped in Cunhaú, south of Rio Grande. The Cunhaú Mill, owned by the governor of Paraíba, Antônio de Albuquerque, and his brothers, as well as the fort next to it, had been conquered by the WIC in October. On the 9th, 7 yachts and 7 boats with 400 soldiers commanded by Admiral Lichtart stormed the Restinga Fort and caused irreparable damage to the defense of Paraíba. The Dutch began to use the Restinga barracks against the Portuguese, making it difficult to relocate troops and send supplies between the forts of Cabedelo and Santo Antônio. In the next few days, the Dutch forces raided Jorge Lopes Brandão's Gargaú plantation in search of supplies and their camps constantly bombarded the Cabedelo Fort.

On the 14th, Captain Fernando de La Riba Aguero and João Vicente São Félix, the Count of Bagnuolo, arrived at Cabedelo with their respective troops, but to avoid the enemy trenches, they headed for Filipeia. While the Portuguese were busy defending the Cabedelo Fort, Captain Jean Descars decided to attack the Santo Antonio Fort with 60 men. On the way, he captured some African slaves and two peasants who informed him that the forts were low on supplies and gunpowder and that the Count of Bagnuolo was in Filipeia with 600 men. Over the next few days, the firing intensified, with Captain Domingos de Arriaga dying on the 15th and Captain Jerônimo Pereira on the 16th. On the 16th, the forces were ready to attack the Santo Antônio Fort. On the 17th, Governor Antonio Albuquerque was planning with the Count of Bagnuolo and Captain La Riba Aguero the best way to send reinforcements to Cabedelo without too many casualties.

On the 18th, without the knowledge of the governor, the captains of Cabedelo Fort, Gregório Guedes Souto Maior and Gaspar de Valcaçar surrendered to the Dutch. Antônio Albuquerque, who was at the Santo Antônio Fort, heard about the loss of the Cabedelo Fort and went to take refuge in the chapel of Our Lady of Guia. Captains Valcaçar, Munoz and Palomo, who had arrived with reinforcements, saw that the fort was unable to resist and surrendered on the morning of the 23rd after negotiations. On hearing of the capitulation, the Count of Bagnuolo, who was in Filipeia, ordered the burning of the houses and the stocks of sugar and brazilwood, in order to leave no spoils for the winners. He also ordered the occupants of the Viradouro Fort to take as many cannons as they could carry and withdraw inland to mount a resistance. Antonio Albuquerque and his companies set fire to three ships and two warehouses loaded with sugar and left for the interior. On the 24th, Christmas Eve 1634, the Dutch entered the abandoned town of Filipeia de Nossa Senhora das Neves.

=== First towns of the Captaincy of Paraíba ===
==== Areia ====
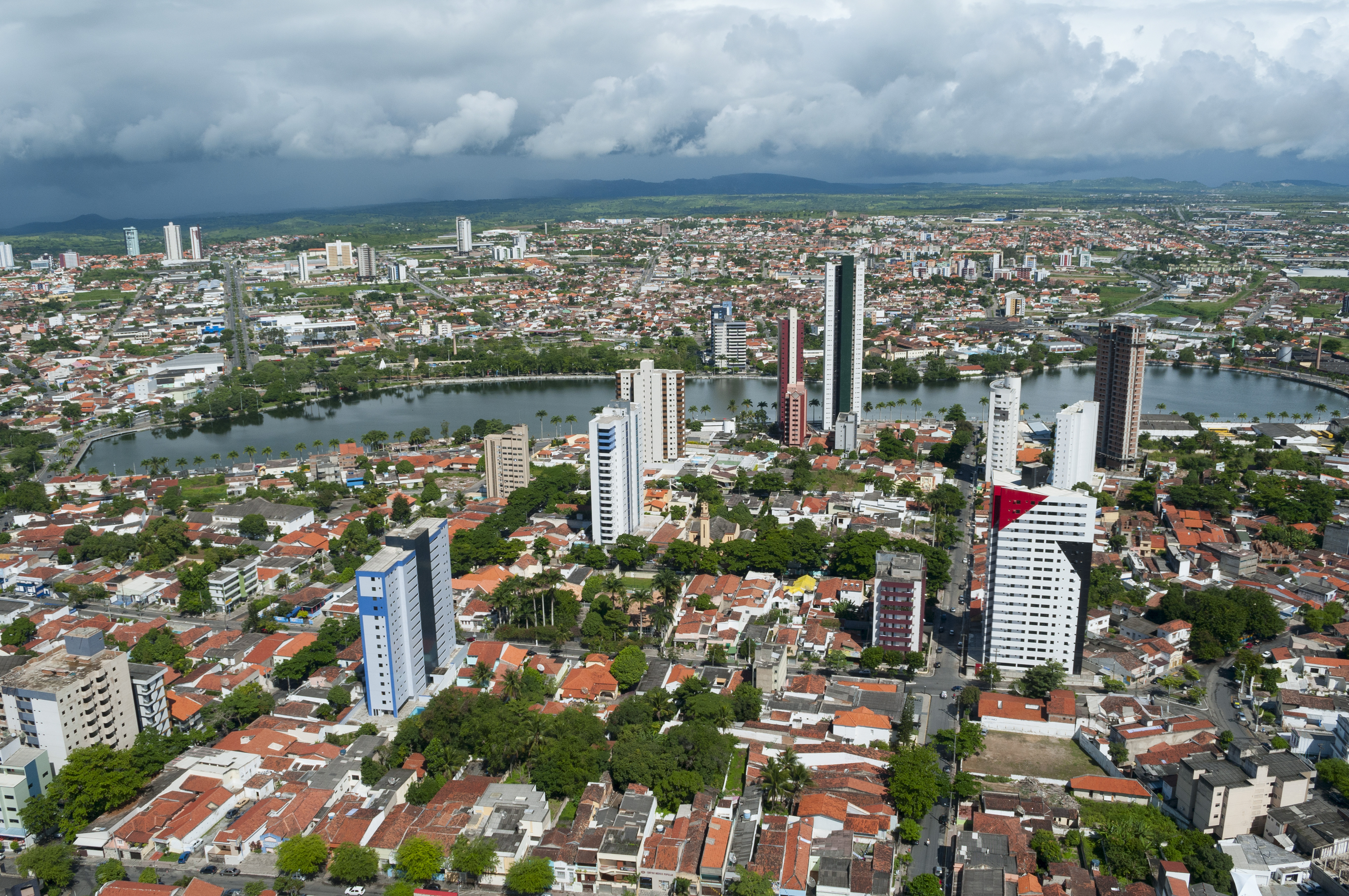
Aerial view of Campina Grande.

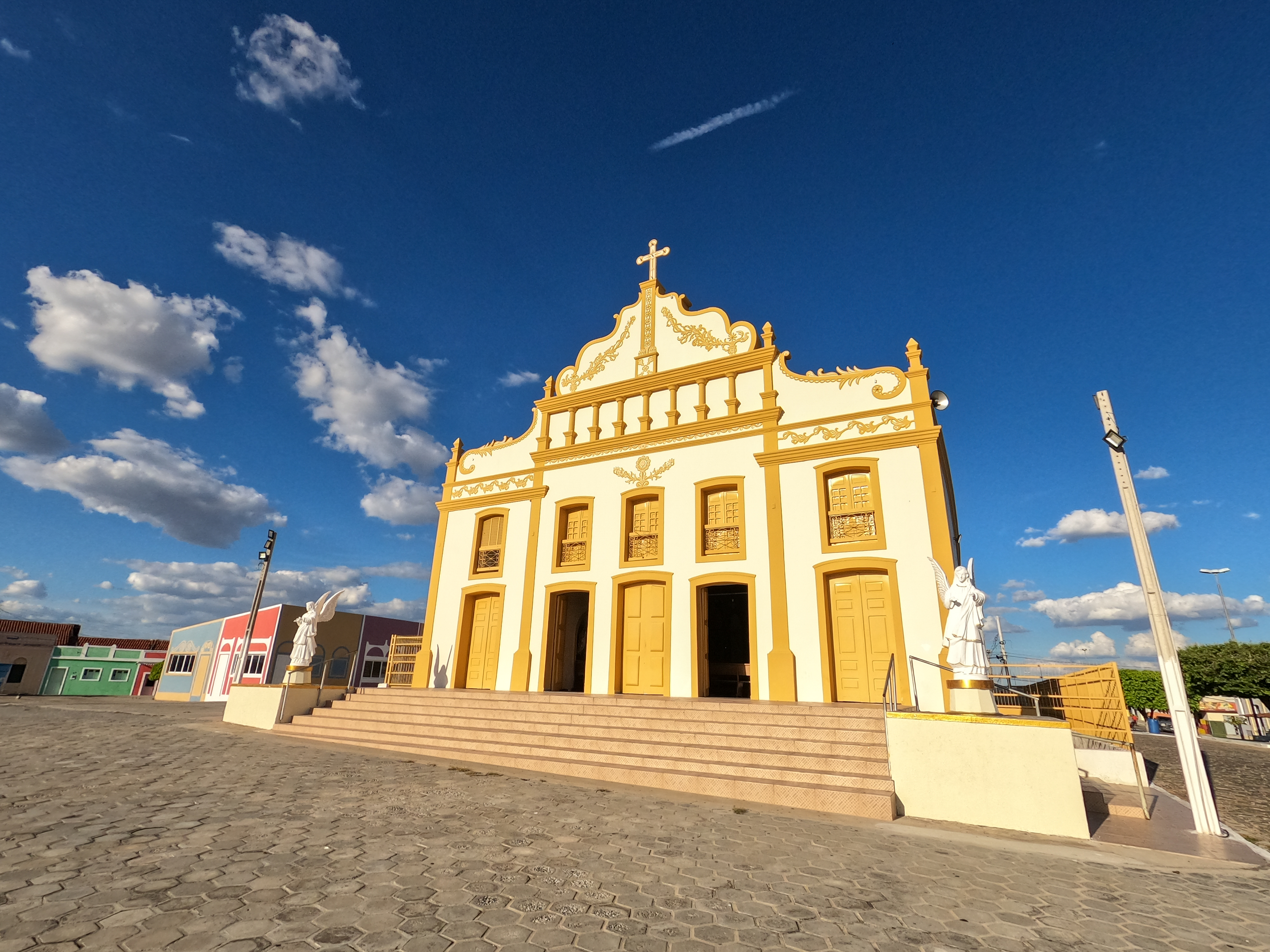
Church of Our Lady of Miracles in São João do Cariri.

Formerly known as Bruxaxá, Areia was elevated to the parish with the name of Nossa Senhora da Conceição by the Royal Charter of May 18, 1815. Its political emancipation took place on May 18, 1846, by creation law number 2. Areia is known for having freed its slaves before the Golden Law.

==== Campina Grande ====
Campina Grande was originally a village of Cariri indigenous people. In 1697, the Portuguese Teodósio de Oliveira Lêdo settled the Ariá tribe there, and the following year the natives began to be catechized by a Franciscan sent by Manoel Soares de Albergaria, governor of the captaincy. Situated between the high hinterland and the coastal area, with land suitable for growing manioc, corn and other cereals indispensable to the settlers' lives, the settlement quickly became a prosperous village. In 1769, it was a parish under the invocation of Nossa Senhora da Conceição, and in 1790, it became a town under the name of Vila Nova da Rainha.

==== Pilar ====
The settlement of Pilar began at the end of the 17th century, when the Dutch found cattle ranches in the area in 1630. In 1670, Jesuits, accompanied by the Cariri indigenous people, founded a school surrounded by a settlement with a population composed mainly of prospectors who moved there in search of gold.

==== Pombal ====
At the end of the 17th century, Teodósio de Oliveira Lêdo made an expedition across the Piranhas River, where he founded a village that was initially named after the stream. Due to the success of the entrance, the place was called Nossa Senhora do Bom Sucesso in honor of the town's patron saint. Under a Royal Charter dated June 22, 1766, the village was renamed Pombal, in honor of the famous Marquis of Pombal.

==== São João do Cariri ====
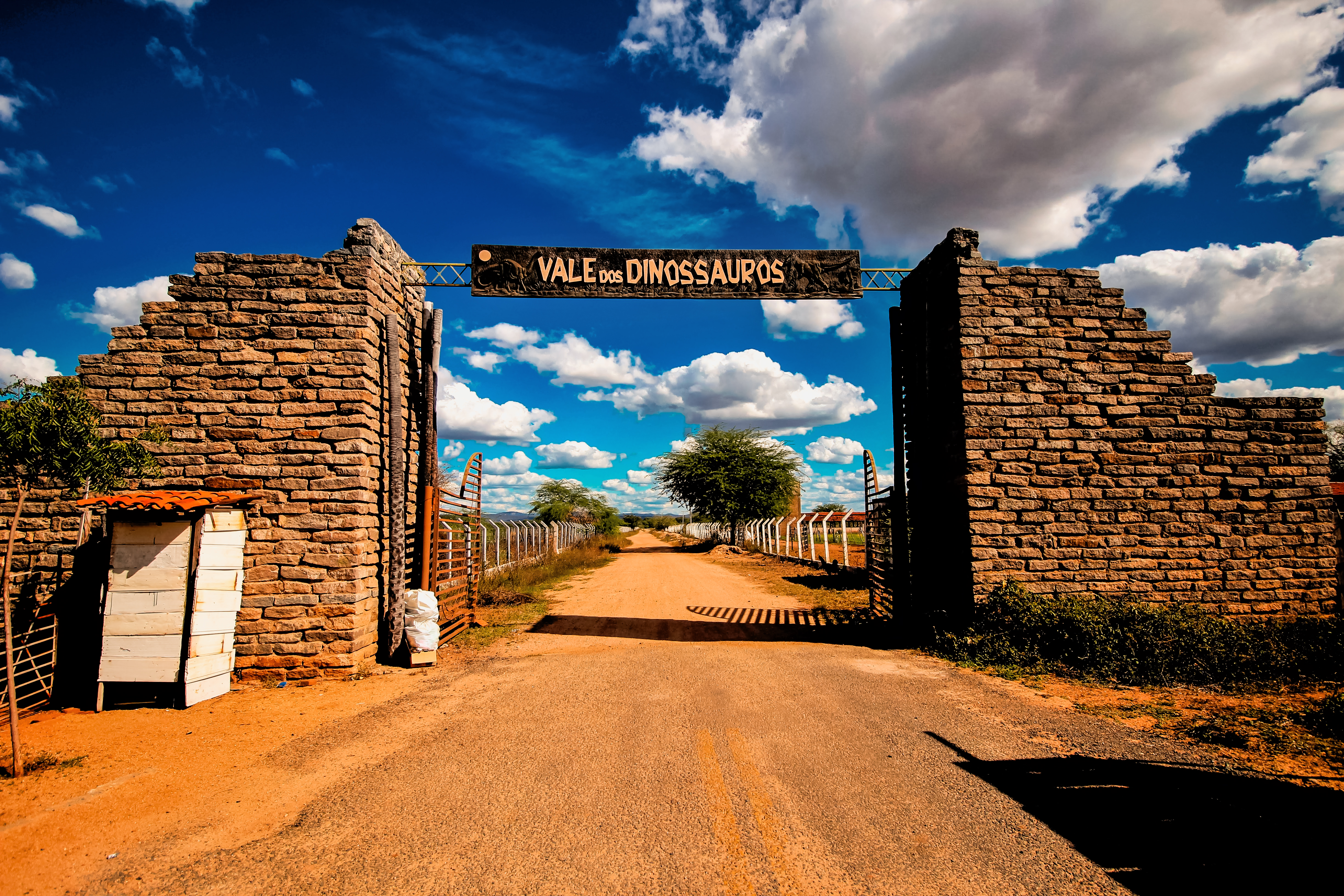
Entrance to the Valley of the Dinosaurs.

Until the middle of the 17th century, the territory was occupied by the large tribe of Cariri indigenous people, which gave rise to the name of the entire physiographic region. In the same century, Custódio Alves Martis, a resident of the Captaincy of Pernambuco, founded a settlement near the Paraiba River, which he named São João. In 1775, the village was elevated to the category of a town with the name of Cariri Velho or Cariri de Fora, to distinguish it from another village with the same name in Pilar. Political emancipation was achieved on November 15, 1831.

==== Sousa ====
Currently the sixth most populous city in the state of Paraíba and home to one of the most important paleontological sites in the country, the Valley of the Dinosaurs, Sousa was once a village known as Jardim do Rio do Peixe. The land in the region was very fertile, which quickly accelerated the process of settlement and progress in the area. By 1730, there were approximately 1,468 people living in the valley. Sousa was elevated to a town with its current name in honor of its benefactor, Bento Freire de Sousa, on July 22, 1766. It was politically emancipated on July 10, 1854.

=== Main religious orders in the Captaincy of Paraíba ===
==== Jesuits ====
The Jesuits were the first missionaries to arrive in the Captaincy of Paraíba. At the behest of Frutuoso Barbosa, they set about building a school in Filipeia. However, due to disagreements with the Franciscans, who did not use such strict educational methods as the Jesuits, the idea was discontinued. The King John V, unhappy with the Jesuits for not allowing the enslavement of the indigenous people, blamed them for the rivalry with the Franciscans and expelled them from the territory. 115 years later, the Jesuits returned to Paraíba and founded a school where they taught Latin, philosophy and literature. Some time later, they founded a seminary next to the Church of Our Lady of the Conception. Today, this area corresponds to the garden of the Government Palace. In 1728, the Jesuits were expelled again.

==== Franciscans ====
The Franciscan priests arrived at the request of Frutuoso Barbosa with the aim of catechizing the natives. Friar Antônio do Campo Maior landed with the purpose of founding the first convent in the captaincy and his work was concentrated in several villages. During Feliciano Coelho's administration, some disagreements began because the Franciscans, like the Jesuits, did not enslave the indigenous people. After some disagreements between them, Feliciano Coelho settled down with the friars. The Church and Convent of Saint Anthony were built on a large plot of land at the top of the hill that contained a limestone quarry, from which the material required for the construction was taken over the years. The religious complex is currently home to the São Francisco Cultural Center, maintained by the Paraíba State Government and administered by the Archdiocese of Paraíba.

==== Benedictines ====
The superior general of the Benedictines was interested in founding a convent there. Antonio Borges da Fonseca, governor of the captaincy, donated a site in order for the convent to be built within two years. The Church of Saint Benedict was located on Nova Street, now General Osório Avenue, where there is still a wind vane with a blade, built in 1753.

==== Carmelites ====
The Carmelite missionaries came to Paraíba at the request of Cardinal Henrique in 1580, when Brazil was under Spanish rule. Their history in the state remains incomplete, as several historical documents were lost in the Dutch invasions, but it is known that they founded a convent and started missionary work. Friar Manuel de Santa Teresa restored the convent after the French Revolution, but it was soon demolished to serve as a residence for the first bishop of Paraíba, Adauto de Miranda Henriques. They also founded the Church of Mount Carmel.

== 18th century ==
=== Annexation by Pernambuco ===
In 1755, the captaincies of Paraíba and Ceará were annexed to Pernambuco. In 1756, in accordance with the Marquis of Pombal's plans for the economic restructuring of the Kingdom of Portugal, hardwood was created and shipped to Pernambuco to rebuild the Lisbon, which had been destroyed by the earthquake of 1755. The materials were also sent to the Royal Navy's warehouses, where they were used to build large ships.

The economic growth of the Captaincy of Paraiba sparked complaints demanding the creation of an autonomous government detached from Pernambuco. Jerônimo José de Melo e Castro, governor of the captaincy, did not accept having his authority contested by Luís Diogo Lobo da Silva, governo of Pernambuco, who prevented him from properly punishing his enemies. His biggest complaint was that any administrative or other act, no matter how insignificant, required him to report to Pernambuco. After the death of Melo e Castro, Fernando Delgado Freire de Castilho was appointed by the Overseas Council to examine the advisability of keeping Paraíba annexed to Pernambuco or creating a government of its own; ultimately, the detachment was approved.

On January 18, 1799, the Royal Letter separating the Captaincy of Paraíba from Pernambuco arrived in Recife. In this document, the reasons alleged for the detachment were the increase in the population, culture and trade of the captaincy and the ignorance of Pernambuco about the internal affairs of Paraíba. The Kingdom of Portugal also ordered the establishment of direct trade between Paraíba and the Crown, but kept the responsibility for the external and internal defense of the captaincy under the control of Pernambuco.

== 19th, 20th and 21st centuries ==
=== Republican period ===
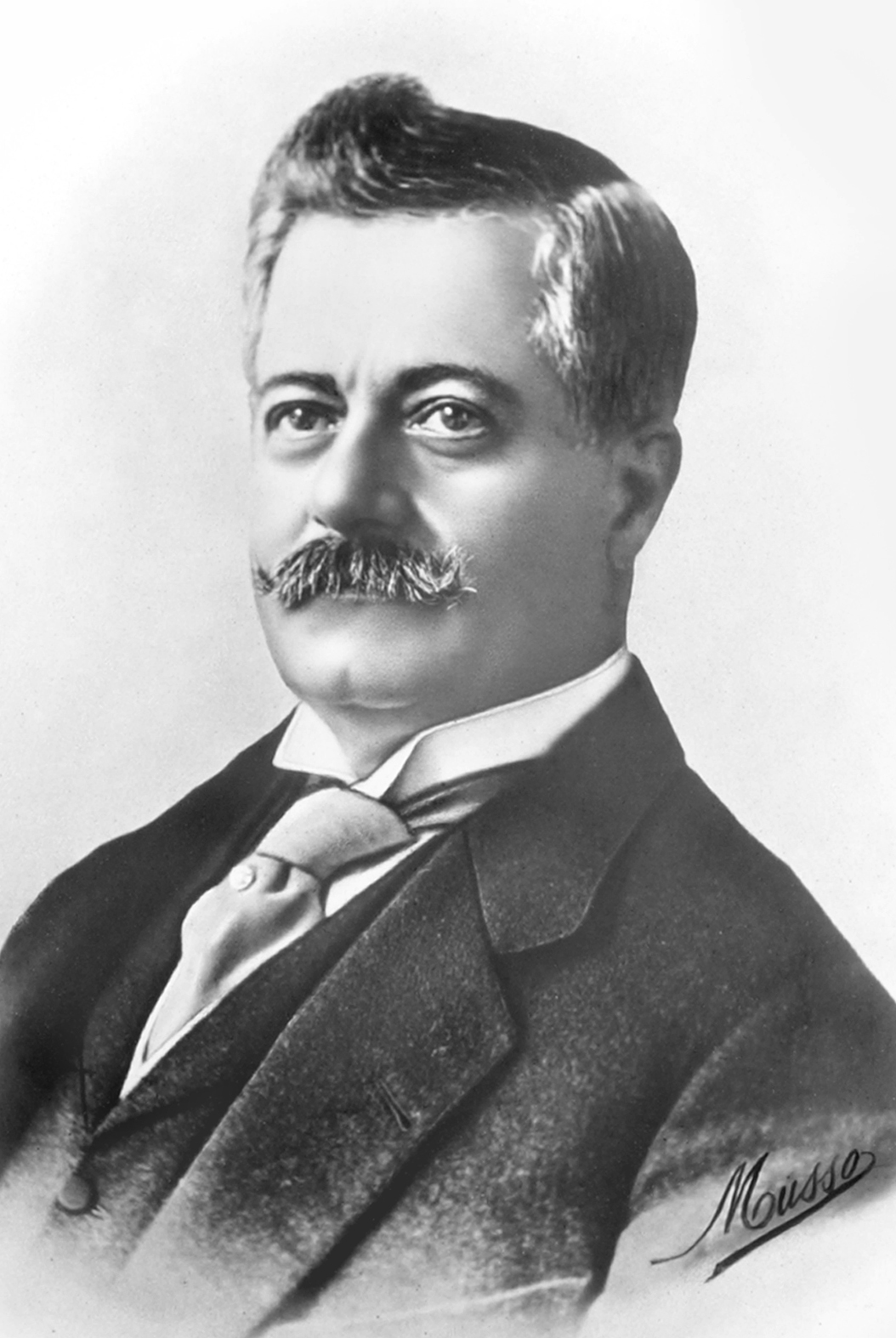
Epitácio Pessoa was the only person from Paraíba to become President of the Republic, between 1919 and 1922, as well as being the only Brazilian to have held the presidency of the federal executive, legislative and judicial branches.

In November 1889, after the collapse of the monarchy and the establishment of the republic in Brazil, Paraíba became a federal state. Its first governor was Venâncio Augusto de Magalhães Neiva, in power from 1889 to 1891, when he was deposed. A triumvirate was installed in his place and governed the state until 1892, when Álvaro Lopes Machado was appointed by Floriano Peixoto to assume the government of Paraíba. During his time in office, Lopes Machado installed the state's Court of Justice, paid civil servants on time, built several public dams in all regions of the state, paved roads, reduced the state's debt, increased the strength of the public force, and created the state press, the Paraíba Board of Trade and the Public Works Directorate. His administration lasted until 1896, when he resigned to run for the Senate and was replaced by the state's vice-president, Monsignor Valfredo Leal, and later by Antônio Alfredo da Gama e Melo.

During the First Republic, between 1889 and 1930, colonels and oligarchies controlled Paraíba, such as: Venâncio Neiva, Álvaro Machado and Epitácio Pessoa. Overall, the period featured the growth of the urban population, as well as the increase in workers' demands and organization, which were repressed during the administration of Epitácio Pessoa. With the outbreak of the World War I, Paraíba's economy went into crisis, mainly due to the fall in cotton exports, one of the state's main agricultural products.

In 1926, the Prestes Column, led by Luís Carlos Prestes, Miguel Costa and Juarez Távora, visited Paraíba. At the same time, the state experienced the cangaço, led by Antônio Silvino, Chico Pereira and Virgulino Ferreira da Silva, in the towns of Cajazeiras, Guarabira, Piancó and Sousa.

==== Revolution of 1930 ====
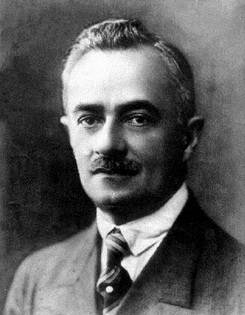
João Pessoa Cavalcanti de Albuquerque, president of the state of Paraíba between 1928 and 1930.

The Revolution of 1930 was an armed insurrection across Brazil that ended the First Republic. President Washington Luís, who was supposed to support the candidacy of Antônio Carlos from Minas Gerais, endorsed the nomination of Júlio Prestes from São Paulo, which broke the alliance between the states. Minas Gerais, along with Paraíba and Rio Grande do Sul, created the Liberal Alliance and nominated Getúlio Vargas and João Pessoa for the presidency and vice-presidency, respectively.

Júlio Prestes' victory sparked a rebellion that prevented him from taking office. In Paraíba, João Pessoa, the defeated candidate, faced several revolts. One of them, led by Colonel José Pereira, an ally of Júlio Prestes, took place in Princesa Isabel, where several houses and offices of those suspected of receiving arms for the rebels were raided by the police. On July 26, 1930, João Pessoa was assassinated by João Duarte Dantas in a confectionery shop in Recife, an episode that caused considerable controversy throughout Brazil and boosted the 1930 Revolution. His body was buried in Rio de Janeiro and the capital of Paraíba, previously called Cidade da Paraíba, was renamed João Pessoa in his honor.

==== Post-First Republic ====
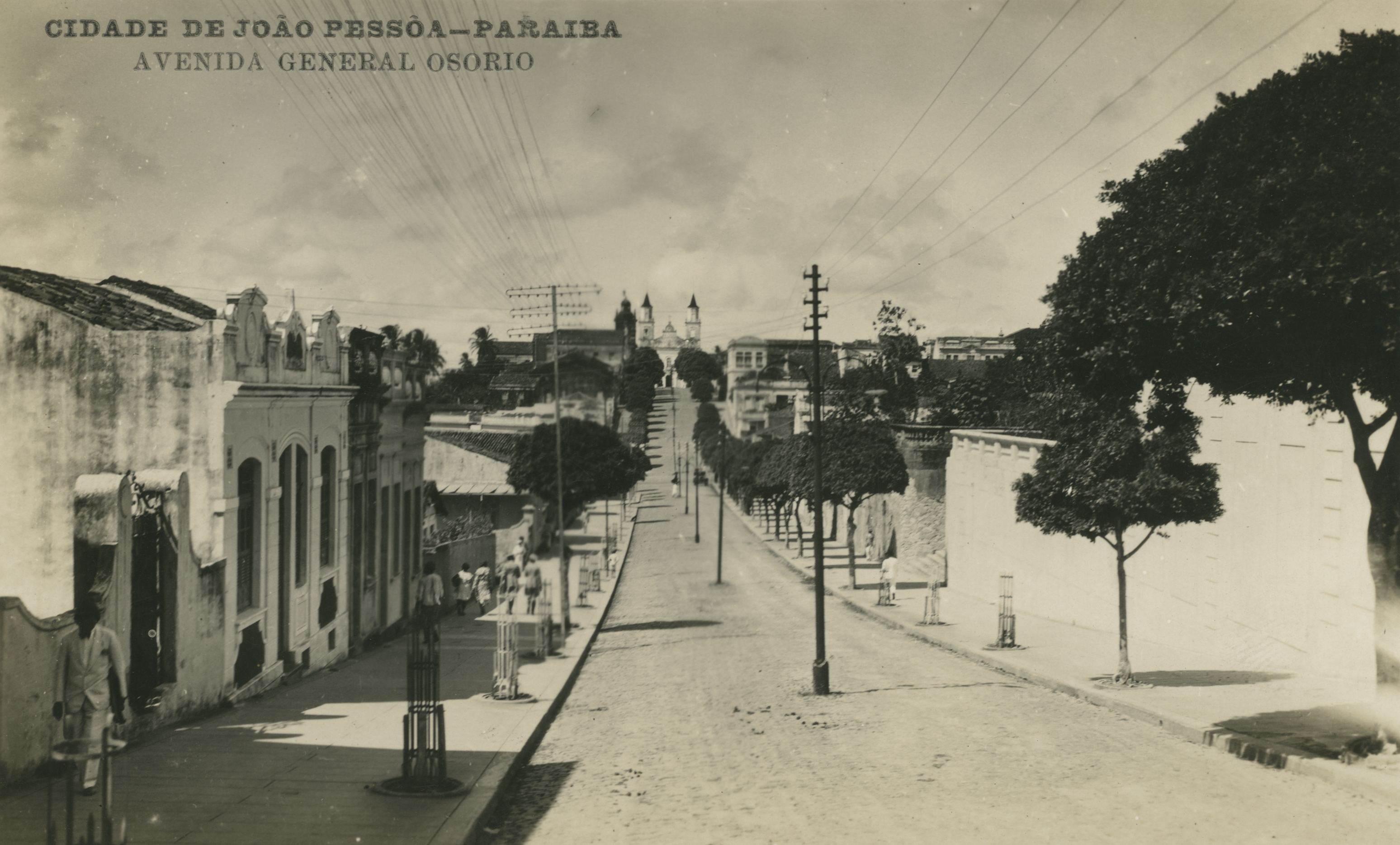
General Osório Avenue, 1930s.

Map of the State of Paraíba, 1926.

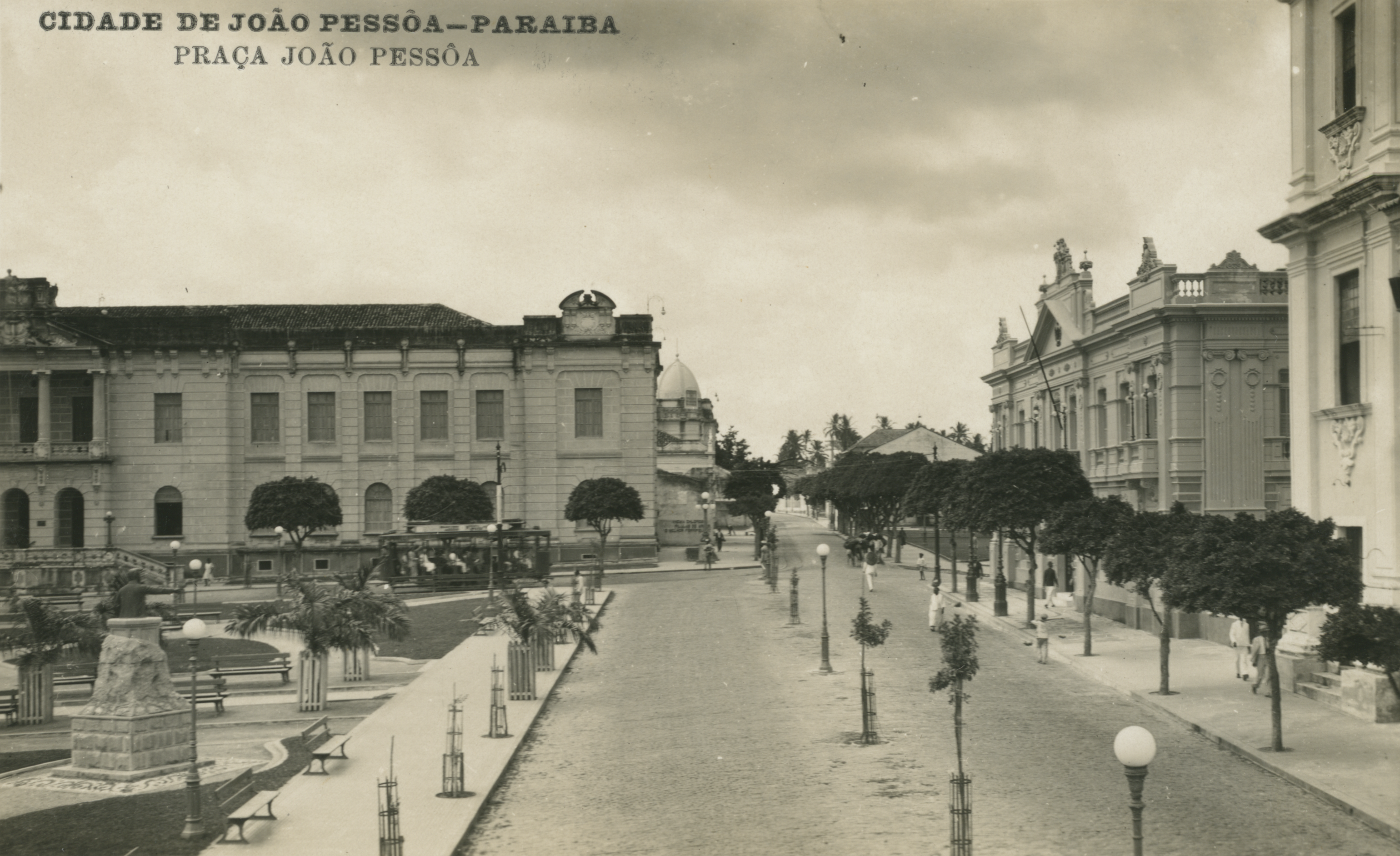
João Pessoa Square, 1930s.

Álvaro Pereira de Carvalho assumed office after João Pessoa's death until October 4, 1930, when he was replaced by José Américo de Almeida, who was appointed federal interventor by President Getúlio Vargas. Later, the position was held by Antenor Navarro, Gratuliano da Costa Brito and José Marques da Silva Mariz. In 1935, Argemiro de Figueiredo was elected governor and, in 1937, with the Estado Novo, he became federal interventor until 1940. Until 1947, Paraíba had several federal interventors appointed by the President of the Republic, the last being José Gomes da Silva, between 1946 and 1947. In the 1960s, Paraíba participated in the 1964 military coup that ousted João Goulart from power, when the state was governed by Pedro Gondim, a Goulart ally. With the establishment of a military dictatorship, several opponents were imprisoned, exiled, tortured or killed. Pedro Gondim had his mandate revoked and his political rights suspended for ten years; João Agripino Filho took over, succeeded by Ernâni Sátiro, Ivan Bichara, Tarcísio Burity, Clóvis Bezerra Cavalcanti and Wilson Braga.

In 1989, during Tarcísio Burity's administration, Paraíba's current constitution was promulgated. In 1991, Ronaldo Cunha Lima was elected and remained in office until 1994, when he resigned to run for the Senate. His vice-president, Cícero Lucena, completed his term. In the 1994 elections, Antônio Mariz, the former mayor of Sousa, won. He took office in 1995, but died the same year, and was succeeded by his vice-president José Maranhão, who was re-elected in 1998 until he resigned in 2002. That year, Cássio Cunha Lima, son of former governor Ronaldo, was elected governor and re-elected in 2006, but his mandate was revoked in 2009, along with his vice-governor, and former governor José Maranhão, who came second in the elections, returned to power. In 2010, Ricardo Vieira Coutinho, former mayor of João Pessoa, was elected to succeed Maranhão, re-elected in 2014 and governed Paraíba until the end of his second term. In 2018, João Azevêdo, former Secretary of Infrastructure, Water Resources, Environment and Science and Technology of Paraíba, was elected governor of the state.

== See also ==
- Captaincy of Paraiba
