= Paraíba do Norte =

Paraíba do Norte may refer to:

- Paraíba do Norte, an old name for the Brazilian state of Paraíba
- Paraíba do Norte River, a river in Paraíba
