= Restinga Island =

Island in Cabedelo, Paraíba, Brazil

- Interactive map of Restinga Island

Geography
- Location: Paraíba do Norte river
- Coordinates: 7°0′S 34°51′W
- Area: 5.8 km^{2} (2.2 sq mi)

Administration
- Brazil
- Paraíba state

Restinga Island (Portuguese: Ilha da Restinga) is an estuary island situated in the Paraíba do Norte river, more specifically in the municipality of Cabedelo, Paraíba, Brazil. It encompasses 580 hectares (5,8 km^{2}) and is part of an archipelago comprised by four other smaller islands, namely Stuart, Tiriri, Andorinhas and Eixo.
