= Paraíba do Norte River =

River in Paraíba, Brazil

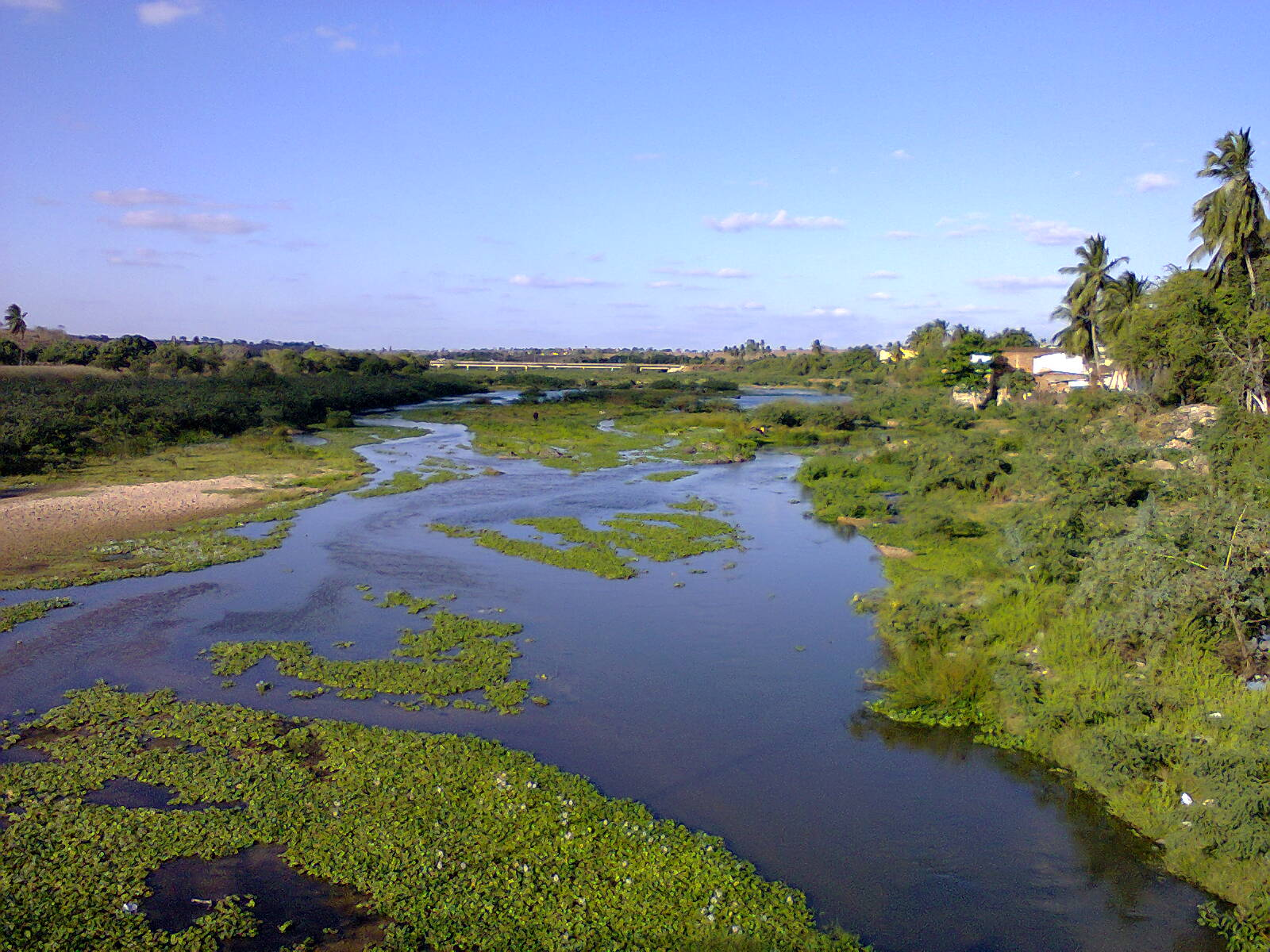
Paraíba river in its medium course, crossing Itabaiana municipality

The Paraíba do Norte River, mostly known as Paraíba River, is the most important watercourse of the state of Paraíba in northeastern Brazil. The river originates in the Borborema Plateau, and flows northeast to empty into the Atlantic Ocean, north of João Pessoa, the state capital. Its constantly menaced estuary has a handful of little islands—among them Restinga and Stuart—and is the habitat of a range of animal species, as well as a number of ecosystems such as mangroves, the Atlantic Forest and salt marshes.
