= Removal of Eduardo Cunha =

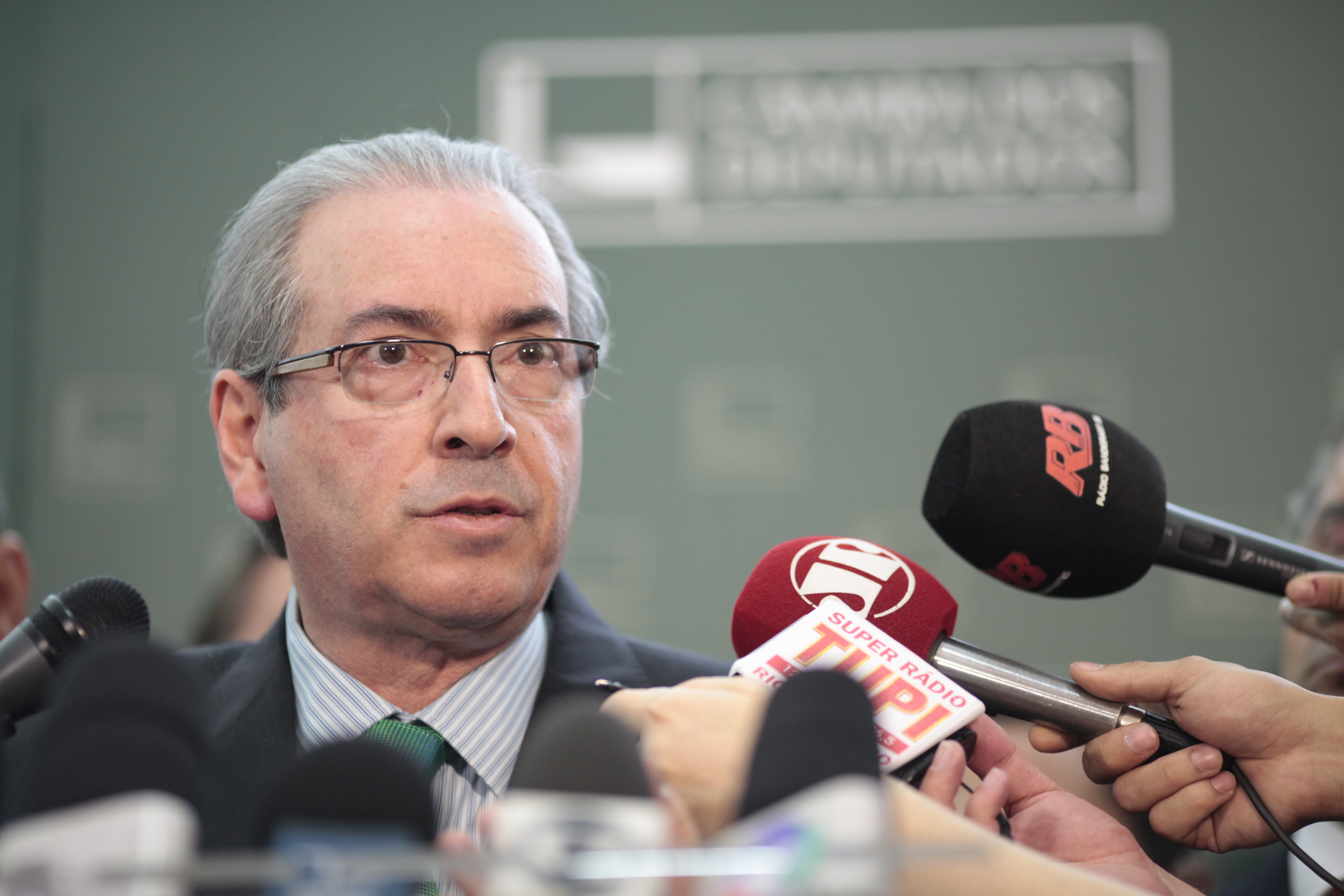
- Accused: Eduardo Cunha, President of the Chamber of Deputies
- Proponents: Socialism and Liberty Party, Sustainability Network
- Date: 3 November 2015 – 12 September 2016 (10 months, 1 week and 2 days)
- Outcome: Motion approved by the Chamber; removed from office; political rights suspended for 10 years
- Charges: Tax evasion and perjury
- Cause: Operation Car Wash

Polls

Voting in the Ethics Council
- Accusation: Vote to approve the report requesting Cunha's removal
- Votes in favor: 11 / 20
- Votes against: 9 / 20
- Result: Approved

Voting in the Constitution and Justice Commission
- Accusation: Voting to appeal from the Ethics Council decision
- Votes in favor: 12 / 66
- Votes against: 48 / 66
- Not voting: 6 / 66
- Result: Appeal rejected; motion proceeds to final voting in the Chamber floor

Voting in the Chamber floor
- Accusation: Vote to remove Cunha from office
- Votes in favor: 450 / 513
- Votes against: 10 / 513
- Present: 10 / 513
- Not voting: 63 / 513
- Result: Cunha removed from office; political rights suspended for 10 years

The removal of Eduardo Cunha consisted of an investigation against Brazilian congressman Eduardo Cunha in the Ethics Council of the Chamber of Deputies for breaking "parliamentary decorum", which resulted in his removal from the Chamber in a voting of 450 to 10. The process began on 3 November 2015 and ended on 12 September 2016.

== History ==
=== Background ===
Cunha was investigated for hiding the existence of bank accounts outside Brazil and lying about it in a testimony before a Parliamentary Inquiry Commission in March 2015.

=== Motion in the Ethics Council ===
On 13 October 2015, the Socialism and Liberty Party and Sustainability Network filed a motion in the Chamber Ethics Council against congressman Eduardo Cunha.

In a session on 19 November, congressman Fausto Pinato (PRB-SP) tried to read his report, but the session was cancelled 20 minutes later after it started, as Cunha began the daily proceedings on 10:44, before having minimum quorum. At the same time, the Ethics Council session was being held, but it was delayed.

On 1 December, after 6 hours of session with interferences of Cunha's allies to delay the works, the meeting ended without voting on the report, due to a joint Congress session in the Chamber floor. On the next day, for the same reason, the meeting was cancelled one more time.

The Council chair met on 3 December with Prosecutor General Rodrigo Janot to talk about Cunha's interferences to delay the process.

On 8 December, there was once again a session held with lots of discussion and no decision. The works were cancelled due to the daily proceedings in the main floor, where it was voted the members to compose the special commission for the impeachment of President Dilma Rousseff.

On 9 December 2015, congressman Pinato was removed from rapporteur by the Chamber Director's Board.

Pinato read his report on 24 November, when Cunha's allies asked for more time to analyze it.

After many delays, it was approved on 2 March 2016 a preliminary report which asked to continue the disciplinary process against Cunha and requesting his removal.

In the beginning of May, Eduardo Cunha was suspended from his term as member of the Chamber by the Supreme Federal Court. The rapporteur of his removal process, congressman Marcos Rogério (PDT-RO), received the position of the technical advisory that Cunha's suspension would not interfere with the progress of the process.

On 10 May 2016, Cunha's defense attorney, Marcelo Nobre, rejected the possibility to request the suspension of the motion. According to him, there were no proofs which could led to the congressman's removal. Members of the Chamber who are part of Cunha's most loyal allies went against expectations and did not express their intention to ask for the disciplinary process to be suspended due to the suspension determined by the Supreme Court. On the first council session after the court ruling, the group had an athypical behaviour during the meeting: no one emphatically supported Cunha and, when they spoke, they showed interest to speed up the works. This meeting was held only for the presentation of a motion which established new rules for substitution of permanent and substitute members of the council. The proposal aimed to avoid changes in the composition during the final days of discussion.

On 17 May, attorney and Economic Law professor of University of São Paulo, Tadeu de Chiara, third and last defense witness, testified before the council and said he didn't know the congressman. He explained that he was approached by Cunha's defense team who gave him the task of "studying the case" regarding the trusts of which the congressman would be a beneficiary. On the same day, due to pressure made against the Progressive Party caucus by Cunha's allies, the resign of congressman Cacá Leão as permanent member of the Ethics Council was decided during a meeting with the Chamber party leader, Aguinaldo Ribeiro.

On 25 May, in response to a point of order made by Carlos Marun (PMDB-RS), Interim President of the Chamber Waldir Maranhão (PP-MA) gave another favorable decision to Eduardo Cunha. In his decision, the final report has to be limited only to the complaints mentioned in the preliminary report approved by the Ethics Council.

On 1 June, congressman Marcos Rogério read his report, which requests Cunha's removal. He states that the congressman lied when said to the inquiry commission that he didn't have bank accounts outside Brazil.

On 8 June the report analysis was postponed. The Ethics Council chair, José Carlos Araújo (PR-BA), delayed the analysis to 8 June, after congressman Marcos Rogério asked for more time to analyze a separate vote which request for a lighter punishment of term suspension.

On 9 June, it was delayed, for a third time, to 14 June. Without enough quorum, the Chamber Constitution and Justice Commission cancelled the meeting.

After around 6 months of processing in the Ethics Council, the removal request, which was considered the longest in the council's history, was approved on 14 June 2016. The approved made by Marcos Rogério was approved in a voting of 11–9, which allowed analysis in the Constitution and Justice Commission and the floor voting.

=== Appeals in the Constitution and Justice Commission ===
On 14 July, congressmen voted to reject an appeal from Eduardo Cunha in the Constitution and Justice Commission. There were 48 votes rejecting the report of congressman Ronaldo Fonseca (PROS-DF), against 12 votes accepting the request. RIght after the result, Cunha made a quick speech stating his mandate is being repealed by his colleagues for omission of information, with a process based in accusations unproven by denouncers.

=== Voting on the Chamber floor ===
On 30 August, congressmen signed a deal and Chamber President Rodrigo Maia (DEM-RJ) confirmed to 12 September 2016 the voting session.

On 12 September 2016, the Chamber floor finally approved his removal. Only 10 members of the Chamber vote in favor of Cunha: Arthur Lira (PP-AL), Carlos Andrade (PHS-RR), Carlos Marun (PMDB-RS), Dâmina Pereira (PSL-MG), João Bacelar (PR-BA), Jozi Araújo (PTN-AP), Júlia Marinho (PSC-PA), Marco Feliciano (PSC-SP), Paulo Pereira da Silva (SD-SP) and Wellington Roberto (PR-PB).

Other 9 congressmen abstained: Laerte Bessa (PR-DF), Rôney Nemer (PP-DF), Alfredo Kaefer (PSL-PR), Nelson Meurer (PP-PR), Alberto Filho (PMDB-MA), André Moura (PSC-SE), Edson Moreira (PR-MG), Mauro Lopes (PMDB-MG) and José Saraiva Felipe (PMDB-MG).

== Suspension ==
AC 4070
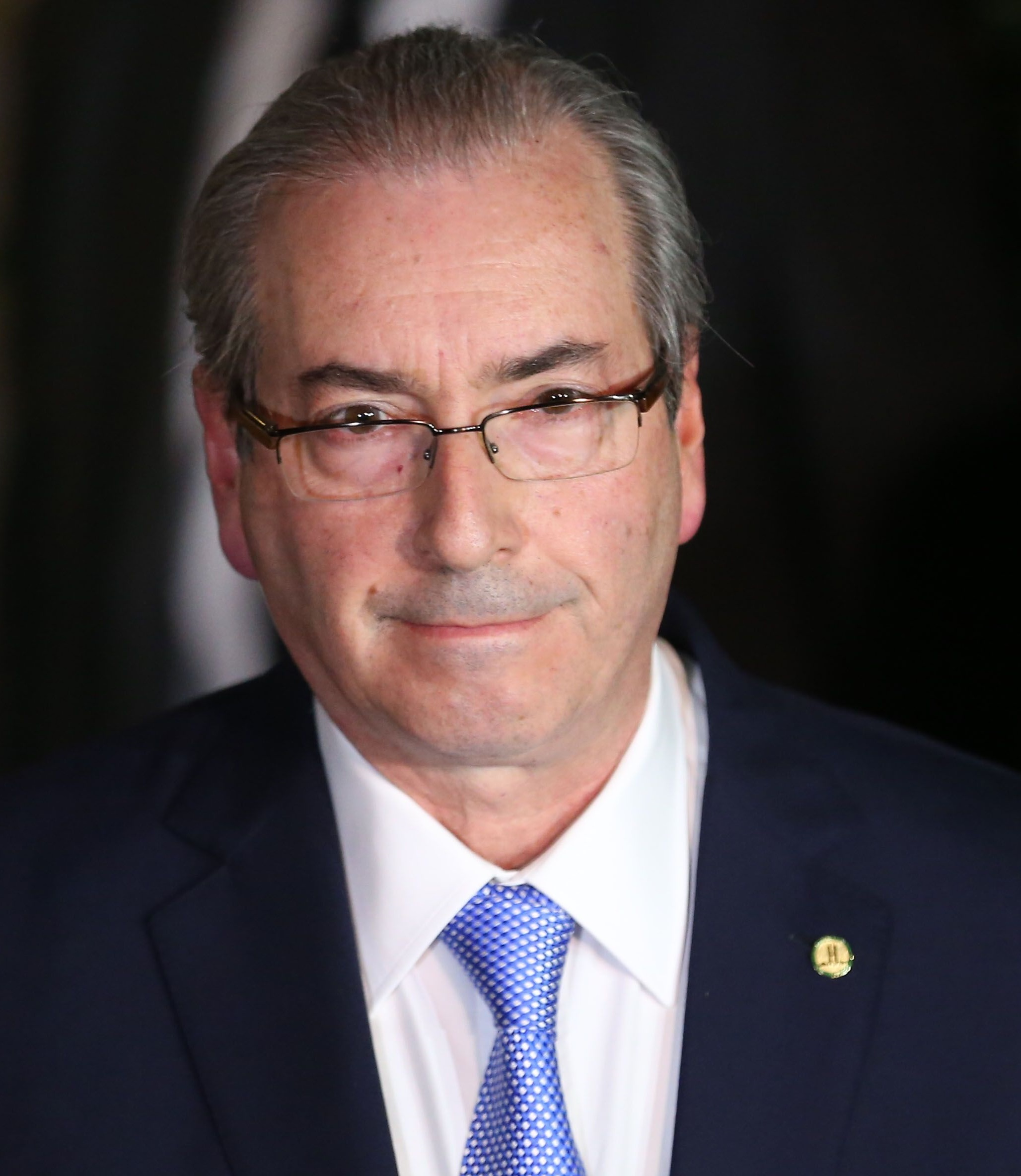
- Eduardo Cunha during press conference on 5 May 2016
- Court: Supreme Federal Court
- Full case name: AC 4070 (Prosecutor-General of the Republic v. Eduardo Cosentino da Cunha)
- Decided: 5 May 2016
- Citation: AC 4070

Court membership
- Judges sitting: President Ricardo Lewandowski Justices: Celso de Mello; Marco Aurélio; Gilmar Mendes; Cármen Lúcia; Dias Toffoli; Luiz Fux; Rosa Weber; Luís Roberto Barroso; Edson Fachin; Teori Zavascki

Case opinions
- Decision by: Zavascki
- Concurrence: Lewandowski, Mello, Aurélio, Mendes, Lúcia, Toffoli, Fux, Weber, Barroso and Fachin

The suspension of Eduardo Cunha from the Chamber of Deputies consisted in a preliminary injunction accepted by Supreme Court justice Teori Zavascki, ruling on Thursday, 5 May 2016, the suspension on the mandate of congressman Cunha. Even suspended, he also held his mandate, but wasn't able to exercise parliamentary activities nor preside the Chamber. Cunha continued with the prerogative of privileged forum, with investigation at the Supreme Court, having been a defendant in Operation Car Wash.

The ruling was sustained by the fact that Cunha (as congressman and as Chamber President) interfered in the investigation against him on the Operation; besides that, as Chamber President, he was in the succession line of the Presidency of the Republic, therefore, he couldn't be a defendant at the Supreme Court.

It was the first time that the Supreme Federal Court suspended a president of the Chamber of Deputies.

=== Judicial lawsuit ===
The suspension was requested by the Prosecutor General of the Republic Rodrigo Janot in December 2015, but justice Zavascki affirmed he had to analyze it cautiously, as he was afraid of a supposed interference made by the Court against the Congress. However, the ruling was made a day after justice Marco Aurélio Mello ruled for the scheduling of another suspension request made by the Sustainability Network.

All of the Supreme Court justices ruled, on 5 May 2016, to accept the injunction and suspend his mandate. They stated that the congressman abused of his position to disturb the Car Wash investigations and his removal process. Cunha said he would appeal on the decision, but refused to resign and affirmed he was being attacked due to the impeachment process of Dilma Rousseff.

=== Aftermath ===
==== Line of succession of the Presidency of Brazil ====
With his suspension and the ongoing impeachment process, the Interim Chamber President Waldir Maranhão couldn't be part of the lines of succession, according to a decision made by the Chamber Director's Board.

==== Line of succession of the Presidency of the Chamber ====
There were two interpretations about Cunha's succession on the Presidency of the Chamber:

- The first said that only the definitive removal from the office of Chamber President is made by the Chamber itself. Therefore, Waldir Maranhão stays in office until his permanent removal is concluded by the Ethics Council, while the Supreme Court ruling is temporary. Besides that, the position wasn't vacant, preventing new elections.
- The second said that, besides the ruling was not definitive, it represented his definitive suspension from the presidency; this interpretation makes clear that he would never assume the Brazilian presidency for being investigated by the Supreme Court, preventing to seat as Chamber President.

==== Loss of rights due to suspension of mandate ====
The Chamber General Board debated about to remove the congressman's rights and perks, such as the use of an official residence, security made by the Legislative Police, suspension of payments to legislative advisors and salary cut.

==== Revocation proceedings in the Ethics Council ====
In May 2016, the rapporteur of the proceedings to revoke Eduardo Cunha’s mandate, deputy Marcos Rogério (DEM-RO), received an opinion from the technical advisory body stating that Cunha’s suspension did not interfere with the progress of the process in the Ethics Council.

=== Reactions ===
==== Politicians ====
- Beto Mansur (PRB-SP) - The First Secretary of the Chamber classified Cunha's suspension as something "new and unprecedented".
- Bruno Cunha Lima (PSDB-PB) - For the state representative, "the cleaning must start at home. Who must start it is the political class, this is good for the political class. This ends the selectivity speech, that Car Wash was aiming the Workers' Party politicians and their allies. This idea must end, because justice is not moved by political ideology and, from now on, it's better that the funnel to become even narrower, that only passes who wants to be part of the political life to add up, who is willing to contribute, because if not, then the political life is not for these people."
- Dilma Rousseff (PT-MG) - On the same day, in a ceremony for the beginning of the operation of Belo Monte Dam, president Rousseff spoke about the situation: "the only thing I'm sorry, but I say sooner than later, is that he sadly made it. You watched him presiding the session in the Chamber, the unfortunate process in the Chamber."
- Eugênio Aragão - On the morning of 5 May, Justice Minister Aragão stated the suspension "came late", while participating in the opening of the II International Congress of Electoral Law at the Mackenzie Presbyterian University, in São Paulo. According to him, if the ruling was made before, the impeachment process wouldn't be accepted, as it was triggered as a revenge against the Workers' Party for not supporting him in the Ethics Council.
- José Carlos Araújo (PR-BA) - The chair of the Ethics Council said that, with the Supreme Court ruling, the council members are now "calmer" and the process would proceed "without any surprises".

==== Jurists ====
- Joaquim Barbosa - The former president of the Supreme Ferderal Court classified the ruling of justice Teori Zavascki to suspend Cunha from the Chamber and the lower house presidency as "brave and extraordinary". Supporting messages to the Supreme Court ruling were made through his Twitter account.

=== International reaction ===
Cunha was named by the international press as "powerful rival" and "leader of the impeachment against Rousseff". Many newspapers from Europe, the United States and Argentina highlighted his suspension.

== See also ==
- 2014 Brazilian political crisis
