= Paraíba State University =

Public university in Paraíba, Brazil

- Universidade Estadual da Paraíba
- Other name: UEPB
- Motto: Terrae Viroque Lumen (Latin: Light from men to Earth)
- Type: Public university
- Established: 1966
- Rector: Antônio Guedes Rangel Júnior
- Location: Campina Grande, Paraíba, Brazil
- Campus: at eight cities; Campina Grande; Lagoa Seca; Guarabira; Catolé do Rocha; João Pessoa; Monteiro; Patos; Araruna
- Website: www.uepb.edu.br/
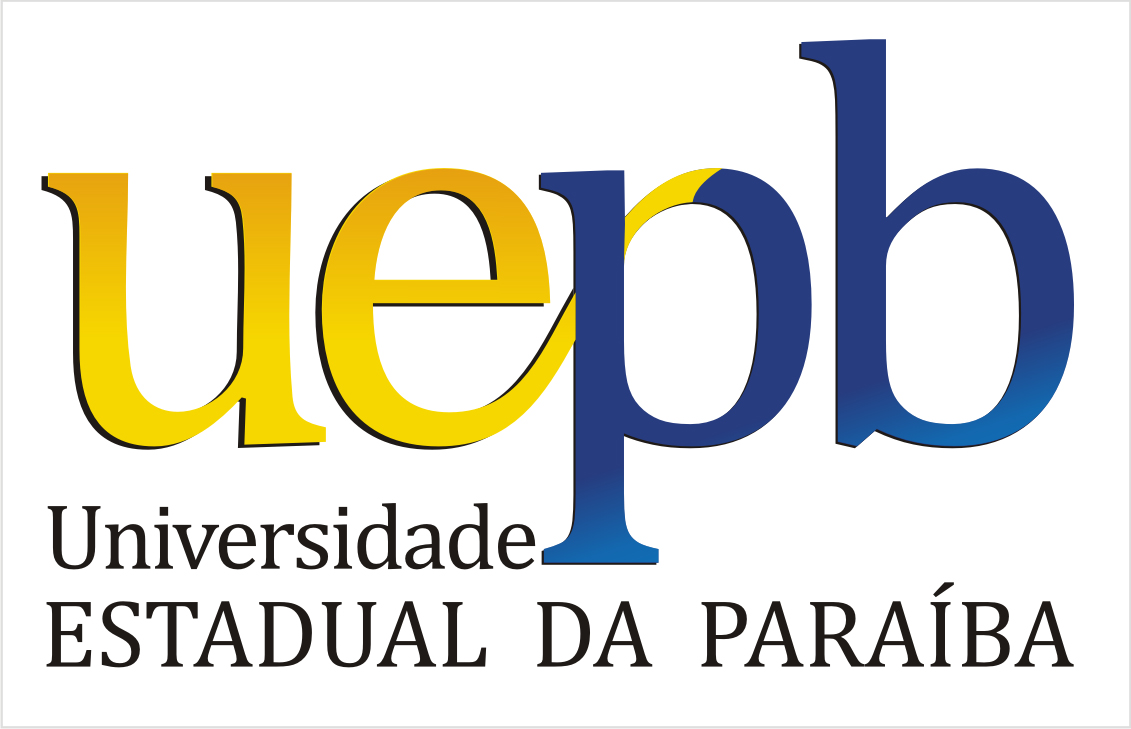

The Paraíba State University (Portuguese: Universidade Estadual da Paraíba, UEPB) is a public university in the Brazilian state of Paraíba. The university has eight campuses throughout the state, and its main campus is located in the city of Campina Grande.

It was founded by local ordinance n. 23, on March 15, 1966, as Regional University of Northeastern Brazil (Portuguese: Universidade Regional do Nordeste - URNe) as a local autarky. On October 11, 1987 by State Law n. 4.977, which was sanctioned by Governor Tarcísio Burity, the URNe became the State University of Paraíba.

== Campuses and subjects ==
UEPB has eight campuses and a total of 46 undergraduate degree courses and 2 technical-level courses.

=== Campus I ===
It is located in the city of Campina Grande. The campus was named after the economist Edvaldo de Souza do Ó, one of the founders of the university. In July 1966, Edvaldo do Ó was first elected vice-rector and was later rector of the Universidade Regional do Nordeste, which eventually became the UEPB, until April 10, 1969. The campus I houses the administrative center of the University.

== Photo gallery ==
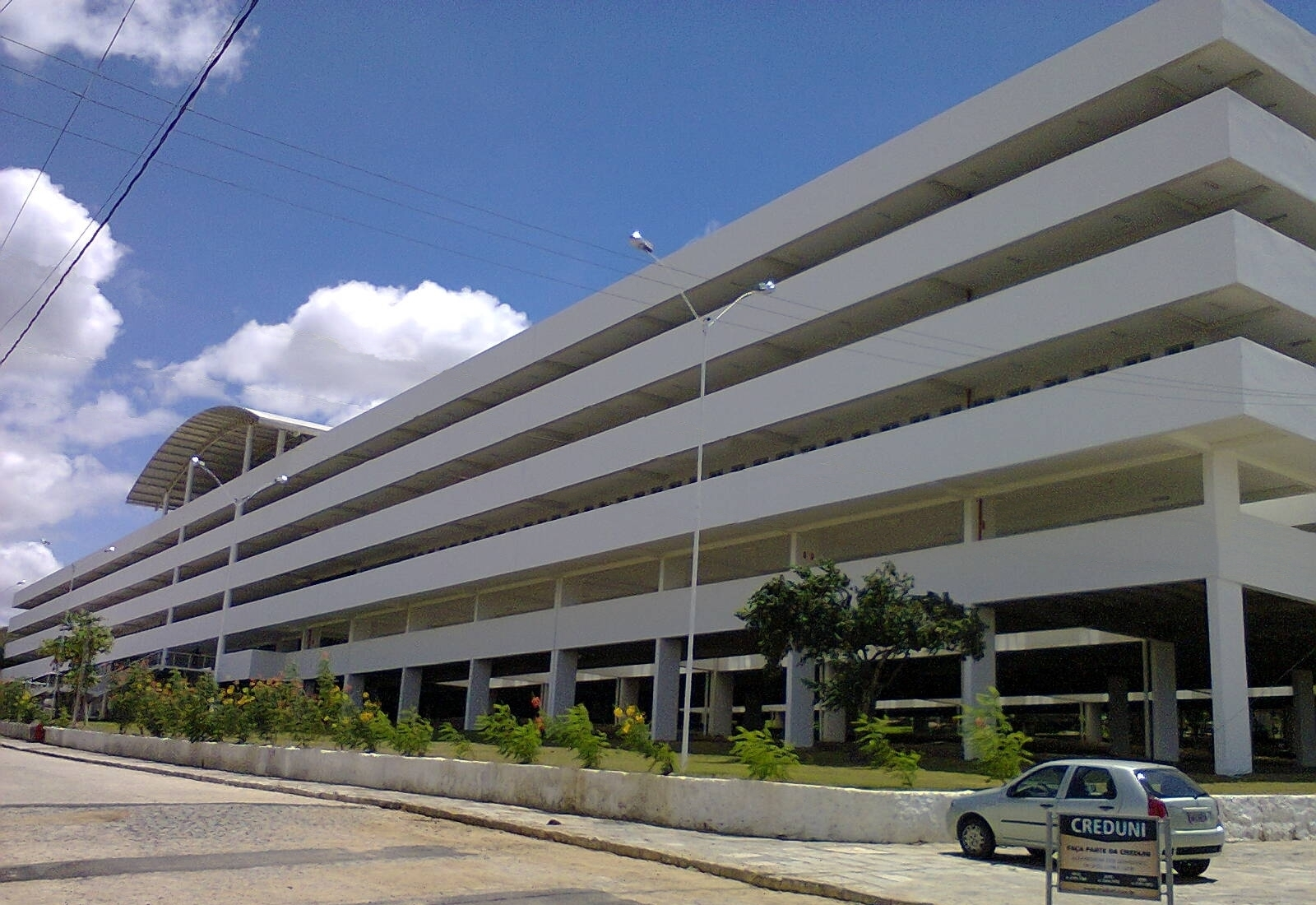
Academic Integration Center at the main campus of UEPB, Campina Grande campus.

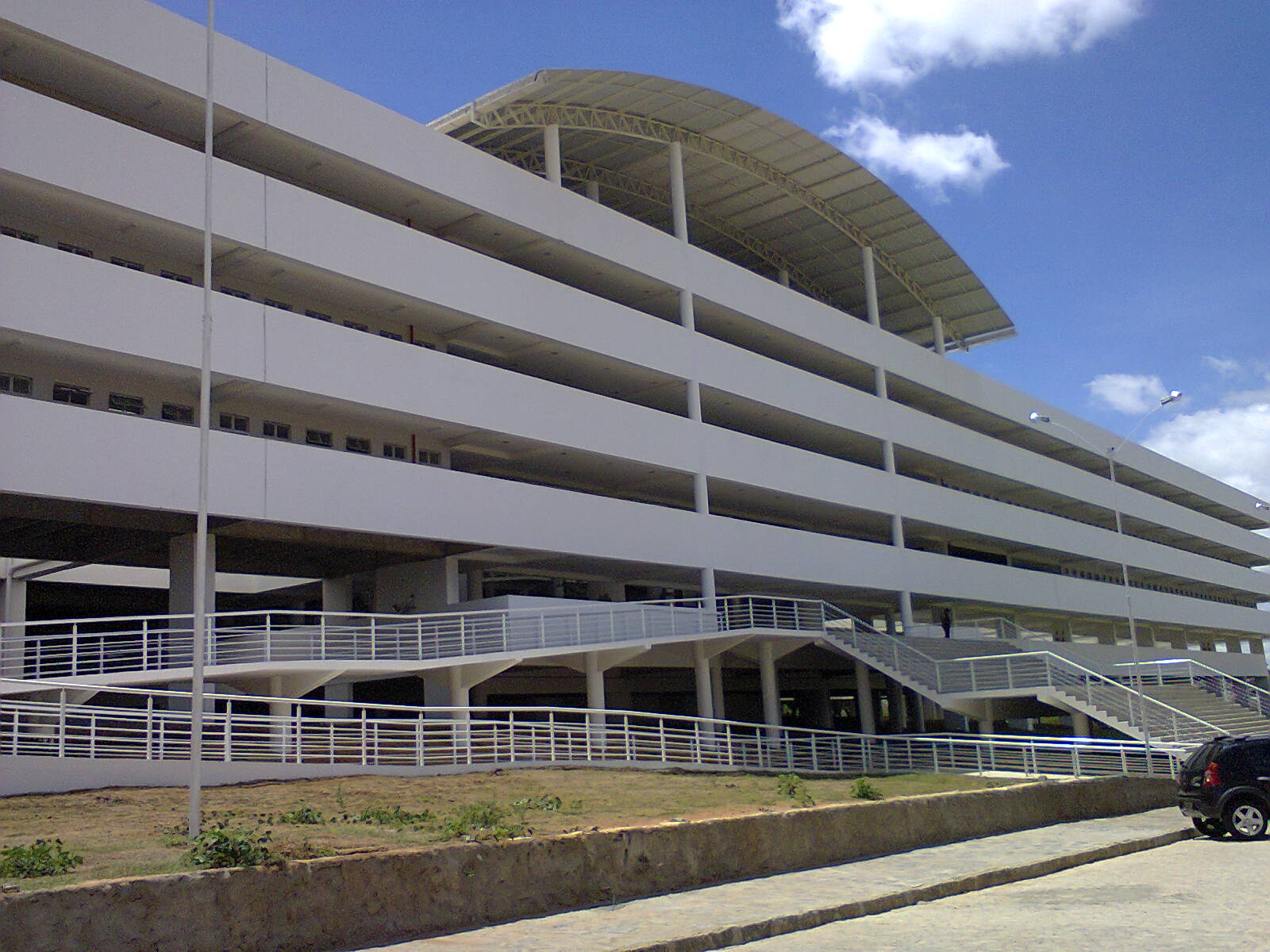
The Academic Integration Center of UEPB, houses the courses of History, Geography, Pedagogy, Philosophy, Literature, Management, Accounting, Social Work and Social Communication.

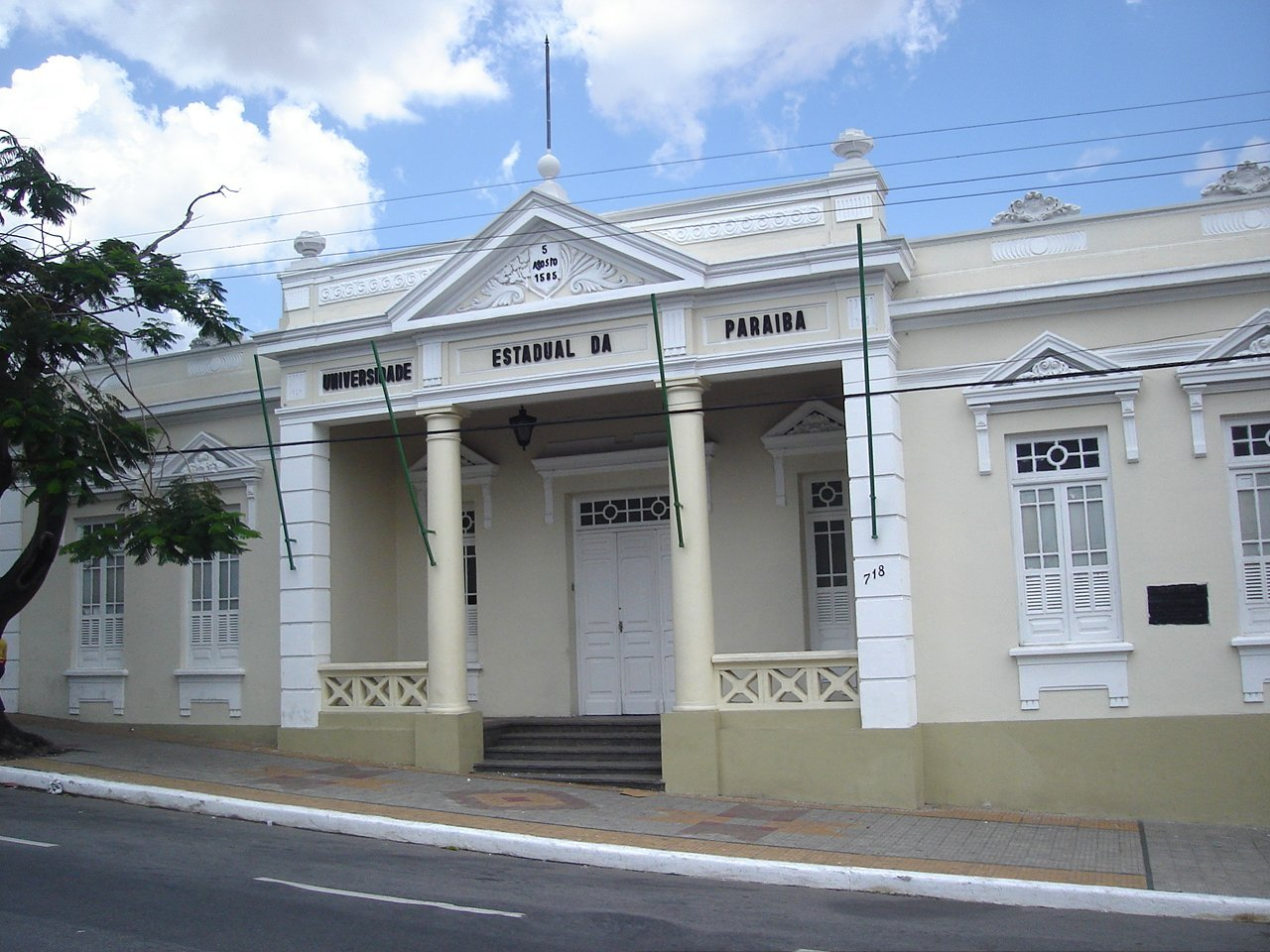
UEPB Museum in downtown Campina Grande.

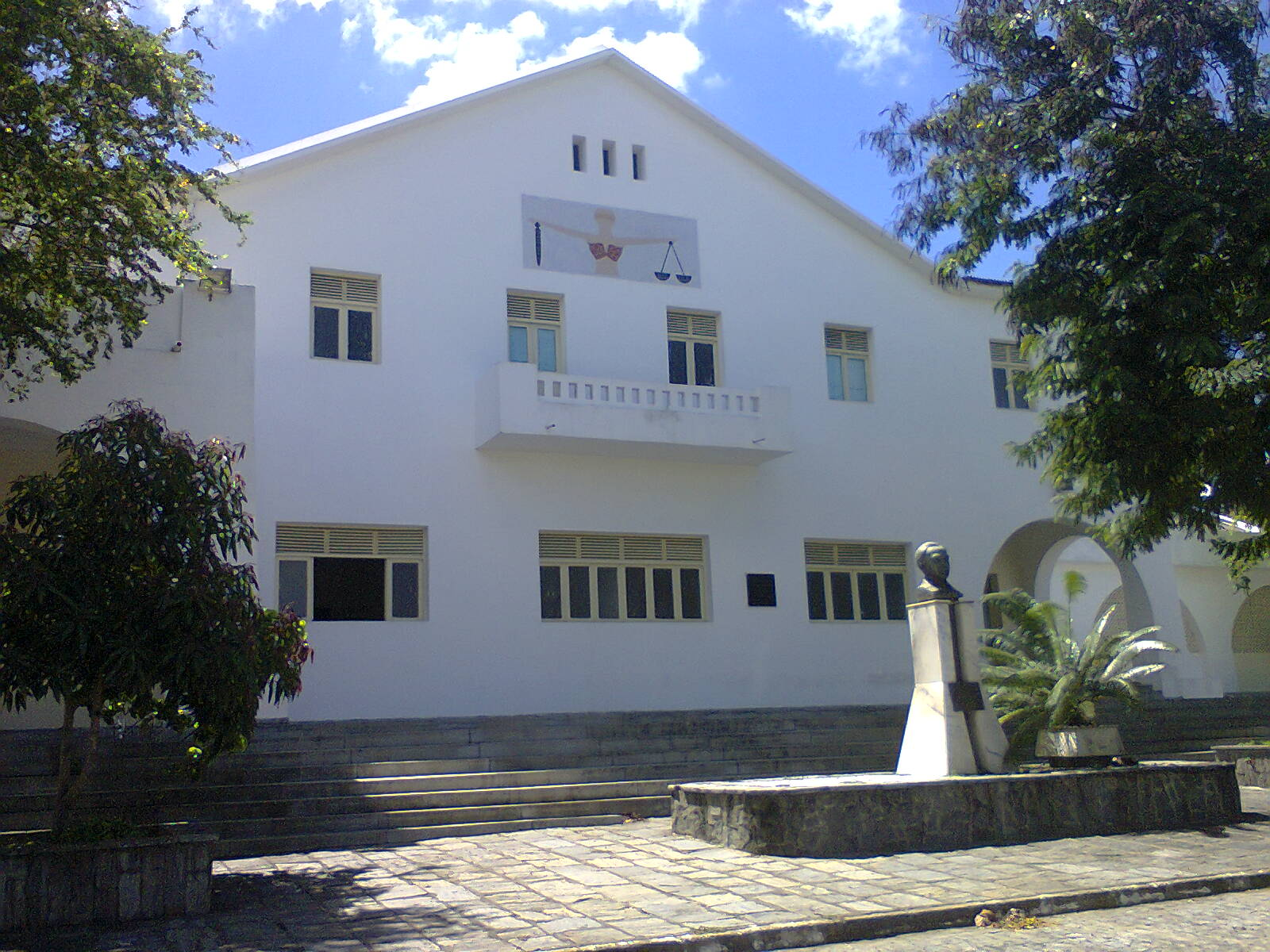
Law school of the State University of Paraíba, Campina Grande campus.

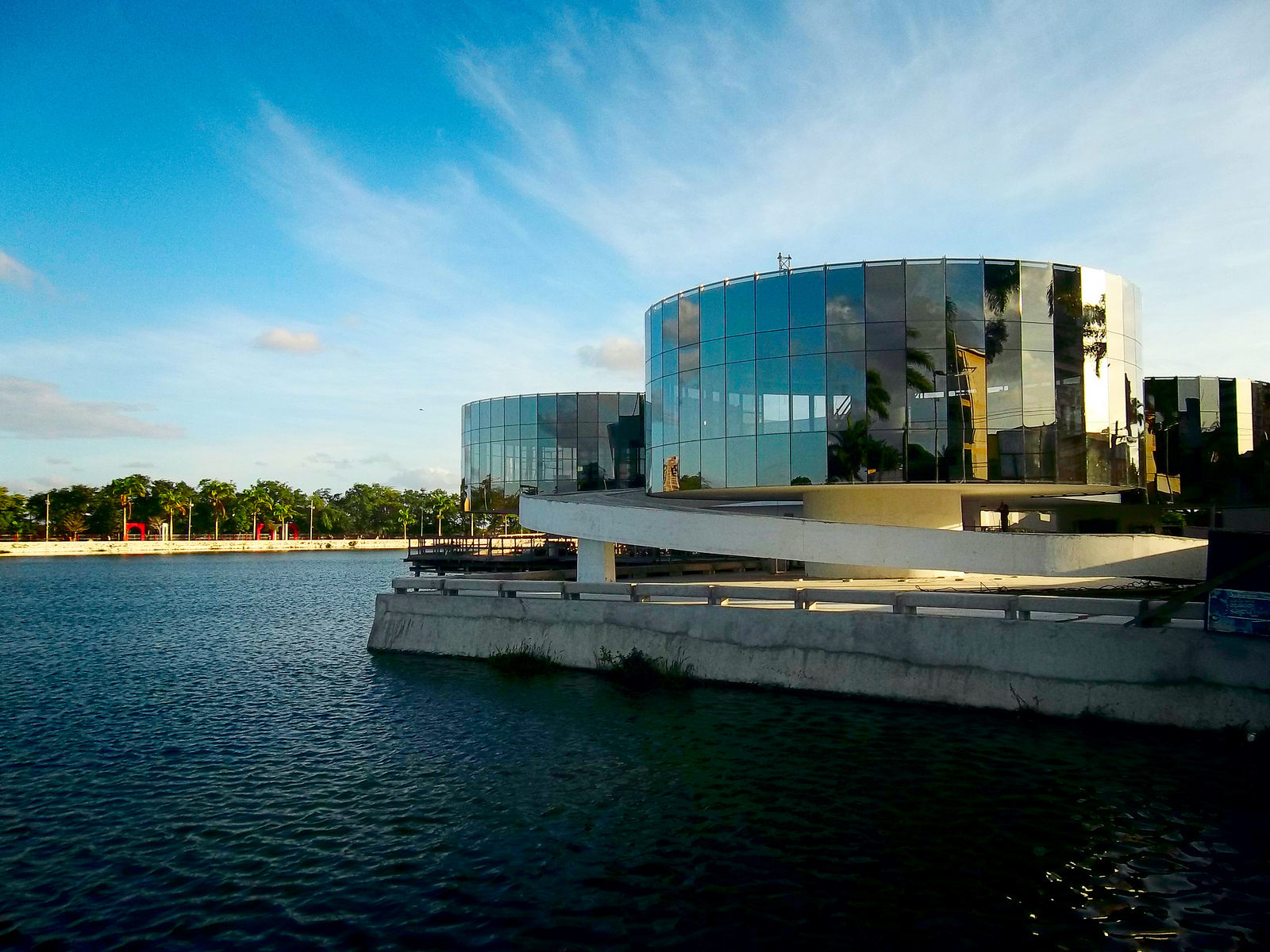
Museum of Popular Arts of Paraíba.

== See also ==
- List of state universities in Brazil
