= Historical and Geographic Museum of Campina Grande =

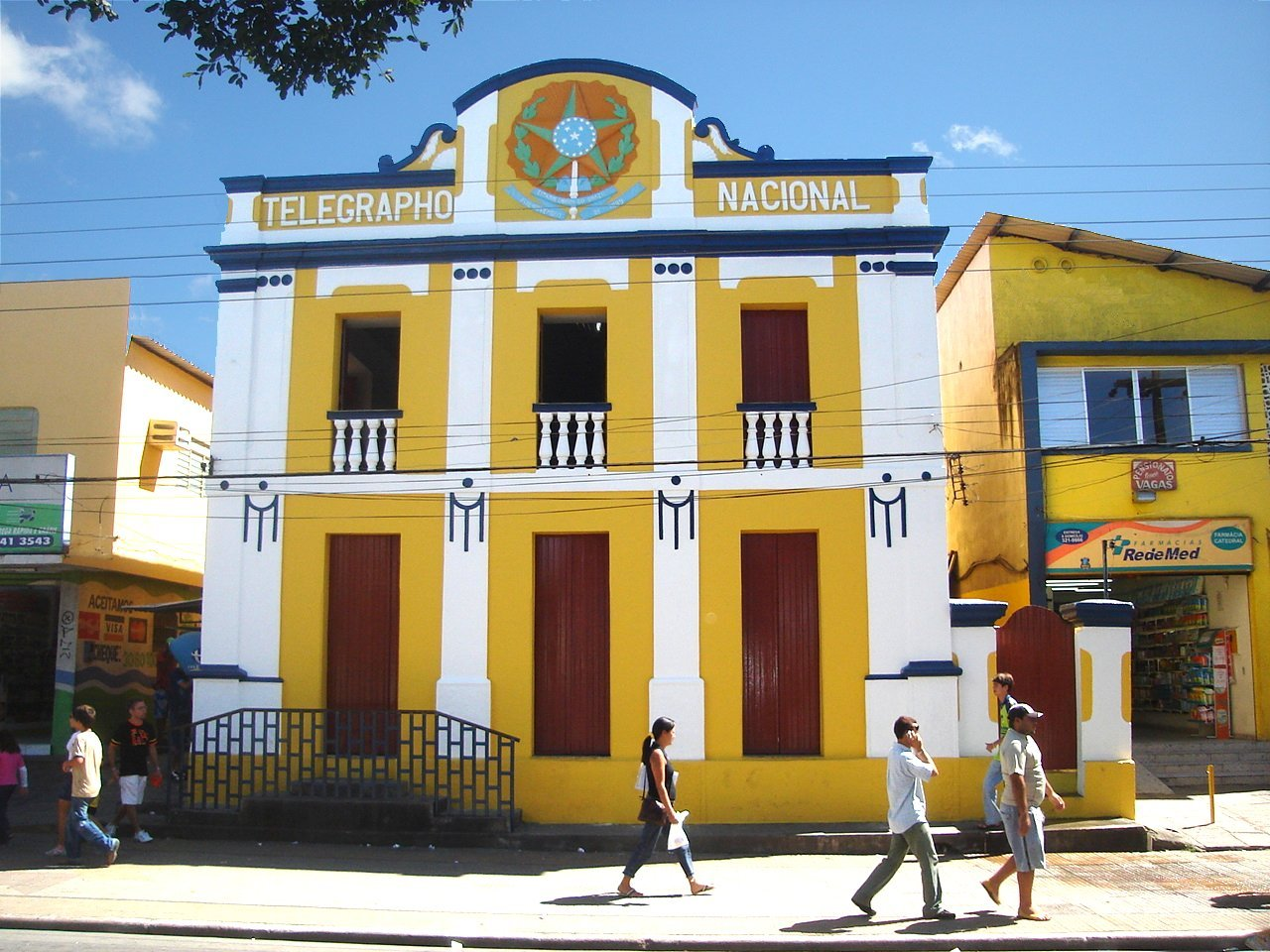
- Street view
- Coordinates: 7°13′07″S 35°52′57″W

Historical and Geographic Museum of Campina Grande is a Brazilian museum, and is located in the Floriano Peixoto Avenue, in Campina Grande, Paraíba.

The heap of the museum is dedicated to the historical, social and cultural development of the city. It possesses photographs, articles, maps, furniture, weapons, vehicles, jewels, dolls and organized tools to relate the history of the city.

== History ==
The building that now houses the Historical and Geographical Museum of Campina Grande began in 1812 and opened in 1814, in Largo da Matriz (currently Avenida Floriano Peixoto). At first, the building was built as the first jail of Campina Grande, 24 years after it became a vila, the Vila Nova da Rainha. For 60 years, the ground floor served as a jail and the first floor functioned as the "Casa da Câmara" (currently Municipal Council ).

In 1824 Vila Nova da Rainha participated in the Confederation of the Equator, helping with the "accommodation" of prisoners brought from Ceará. Frei Caneca, a participant in the revolution, was trapped in the prison building, where the Historical and Geographical Museum now stands.

On January 13, 1896, the Telegraph Station initially called "Telephone Station" was inaugurated. The phrase "Telegrapho Nacional" is still stamped on the top of the building.

In January 1983 the building began to house the historical museum.

== Collection ==
The museum's collection is dedicated to the historical, social and cultural development of Campina Grande. It has photos, articles, maps, furniture, weapons, vehicles, jewels, dolls and tools organized to tell the story of the city.
