= Museum of Popular Arts of Paraíba =

- Museu de Arte Popular da Paraíba
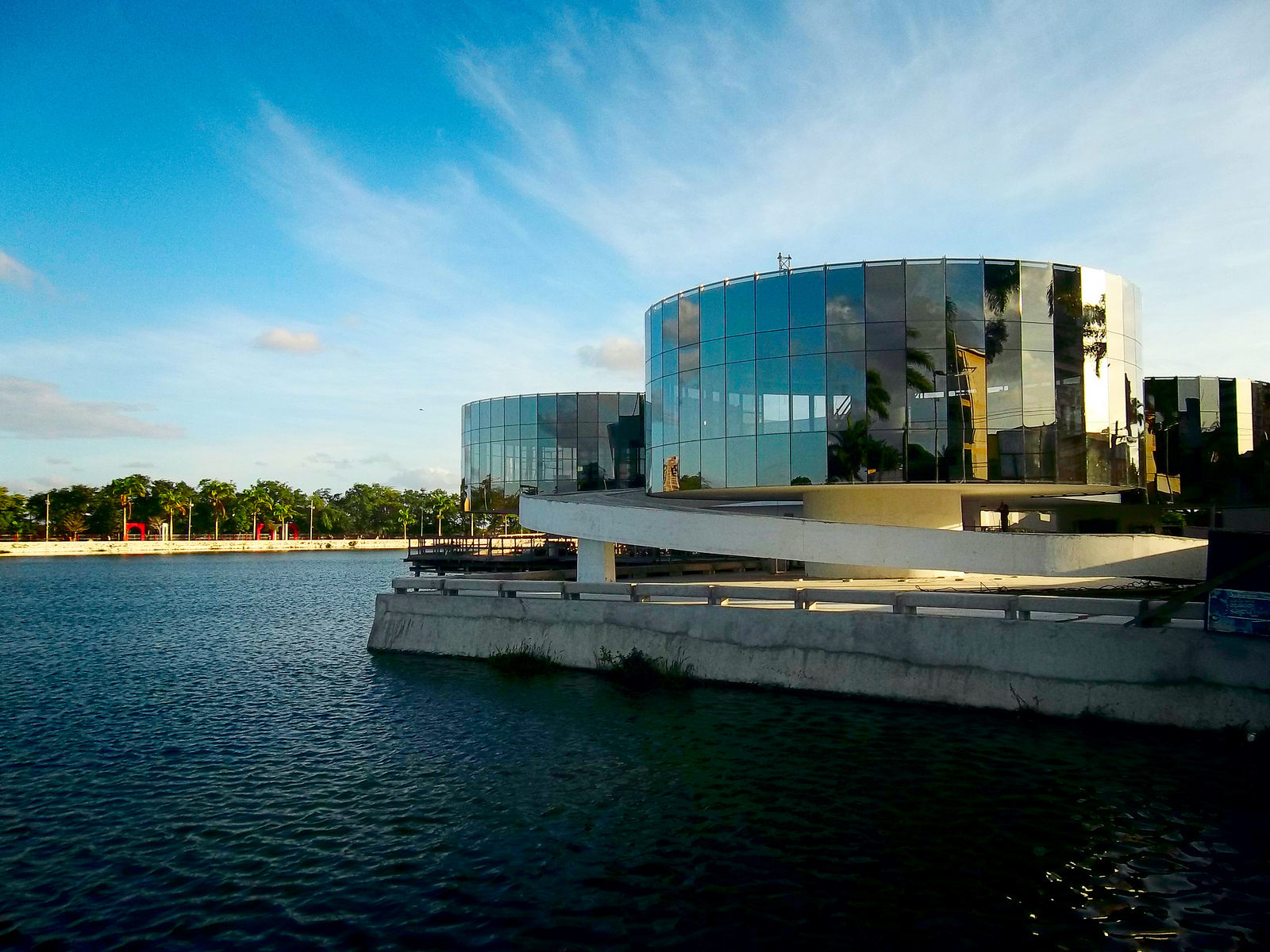
- Location: Brazil
- Coordinates: 7°13′27″S 35°52′44″W
- Key holdings: Paraíba State University
- Architect: Oscar Niemeyer
- Website: museu.uepb.edu.br/mapp/
- Location of Museum of Popular Arts of Paraíba

The Museum of Popular Arts of Paraíba (MAPP) (Portuguese: Museu de Arte Popular da Paraíba), also known as "Three Pandeiros Museum", due to its circular shape, is based in the city of Campina Grande, state of Paraíba, Brazil. It was designed by the architect Oscar Niemeyer, being his last project, and is part of the State University of Paraíba. It was inaugurated December 13, 2012, but officially opened to public visitation in 2014.
