= Bruno Cunha Lima =

Brazilian politician (born 1990)

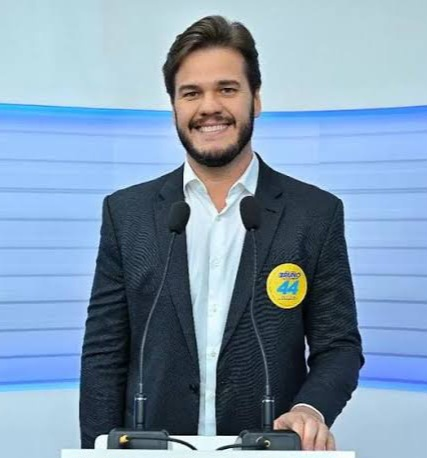
- Cunha Lima in 2024

Mayor of Campina Grande
- Incumbent
- Assumed office 1 January 2021
- Preceded by: Romero Rodrigues

Personal details
- Born: 17 November 1990 (age 35)
- Party: Brazil Union (since 2023)
- Relatives: Ivandro Cunha Lima (grandfather); Ronaldo Cunha Lima (great-uncle)

Bruno Cunha Lima Branco (born 17 November 1990) is a Brazilian politician serving as mayor of Campina Grande since 2021. From 2015 to 2018, he was a member of the Legislative Assembly of Paraíba. He is the grandson of Ivandro Cunha Lima and the great-nephew of Ronaldo Cunha Lima.
