= Campina Grande =

City in Paraíba, Brazil

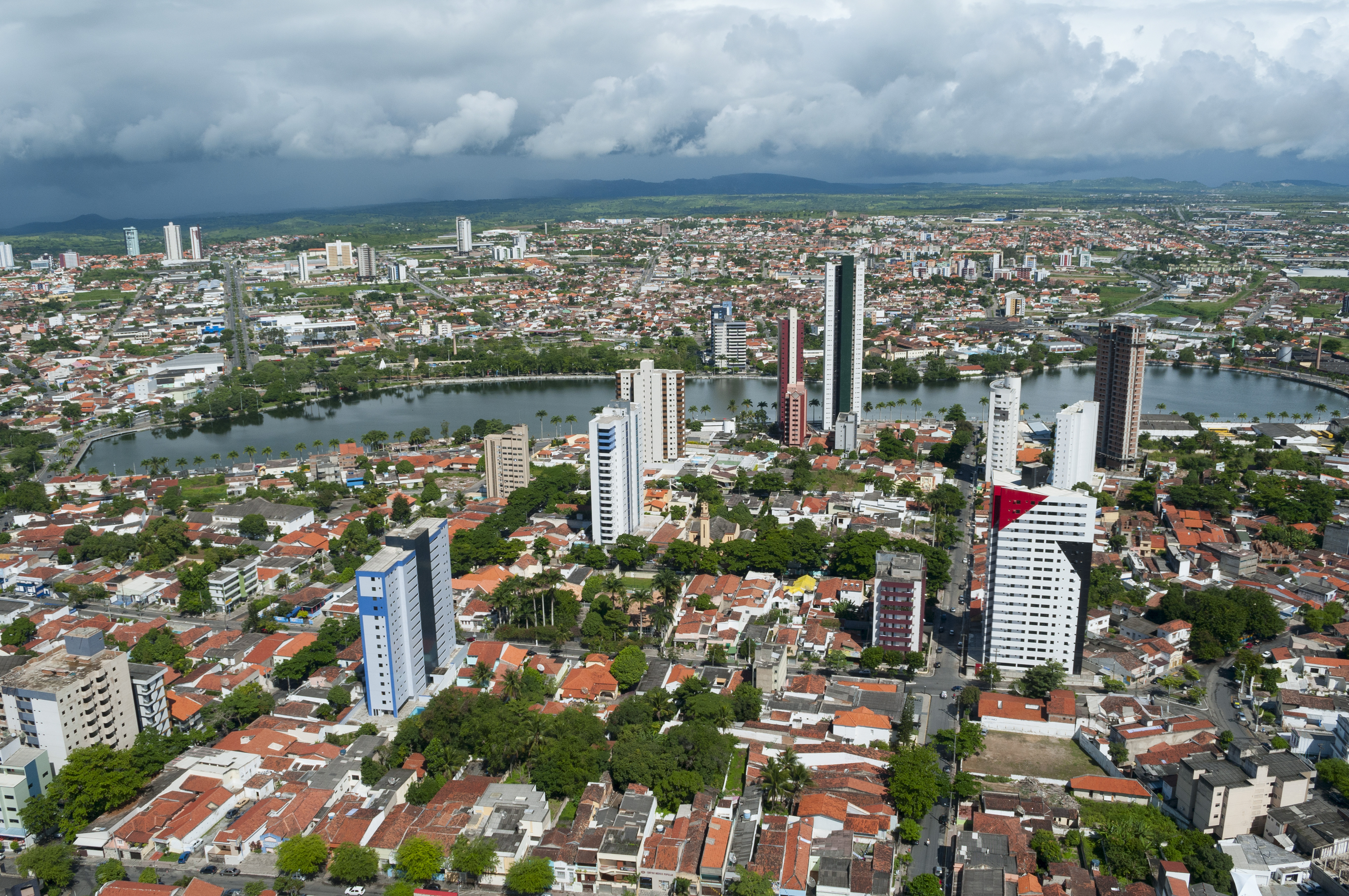
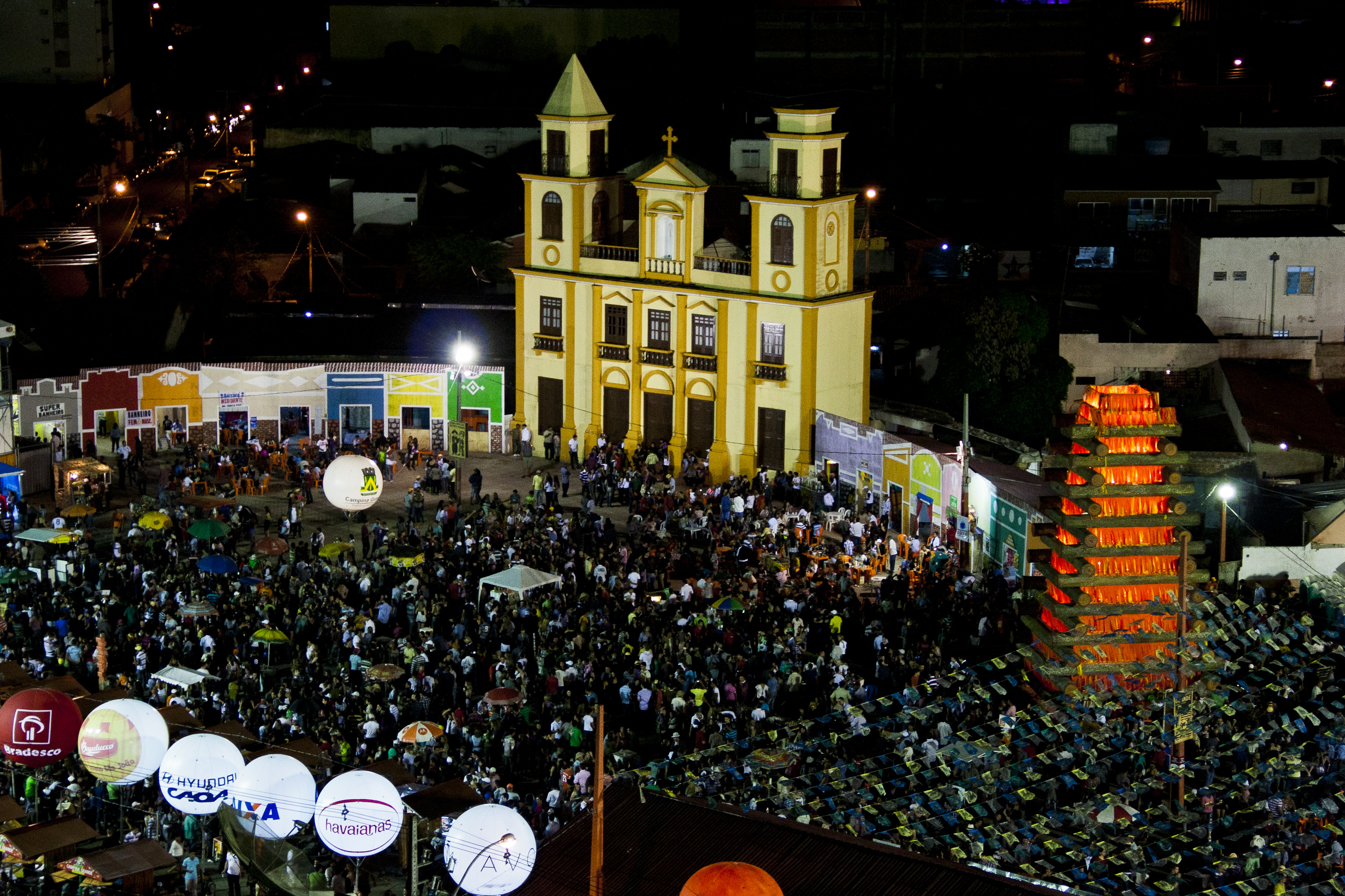
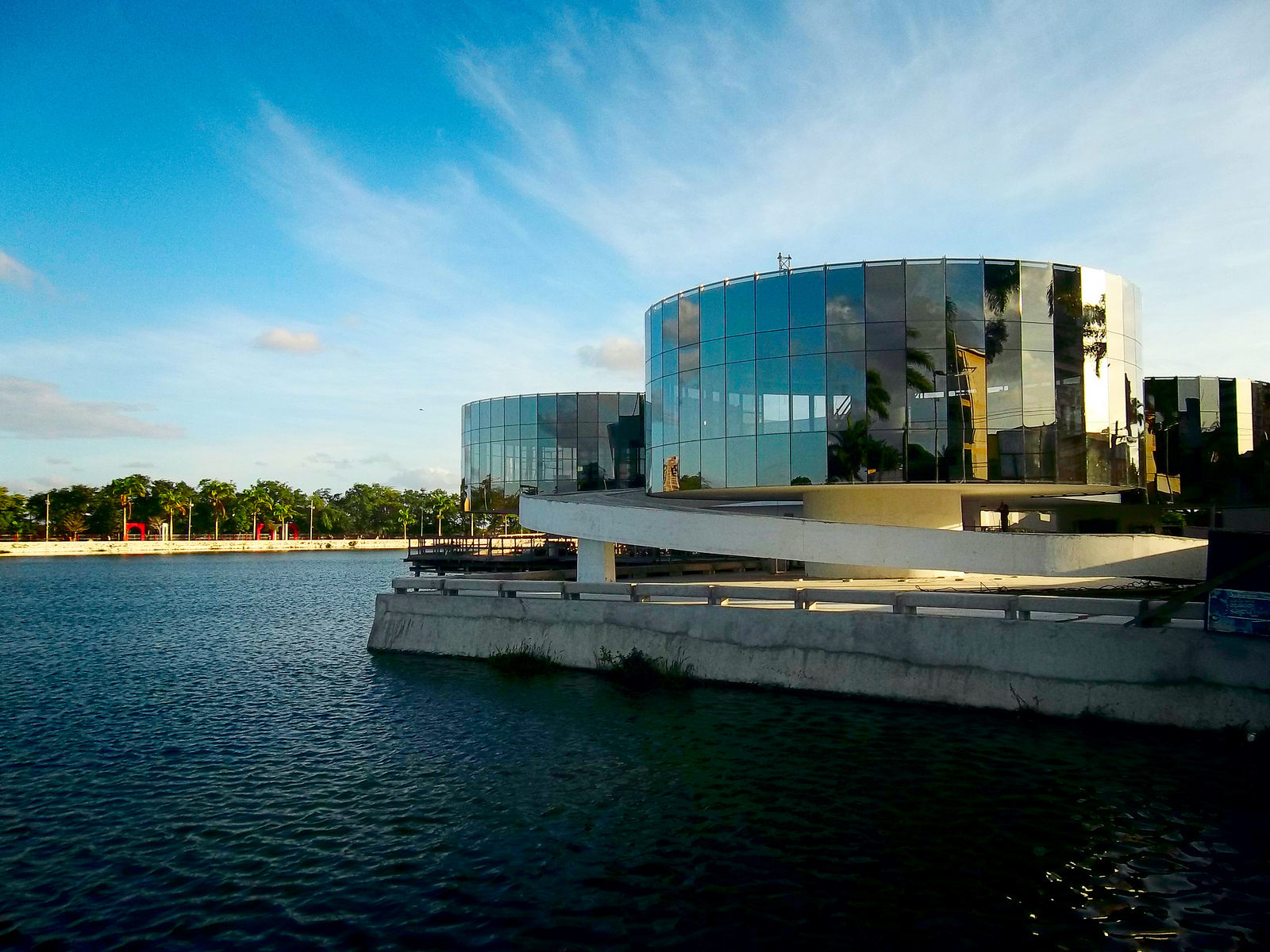
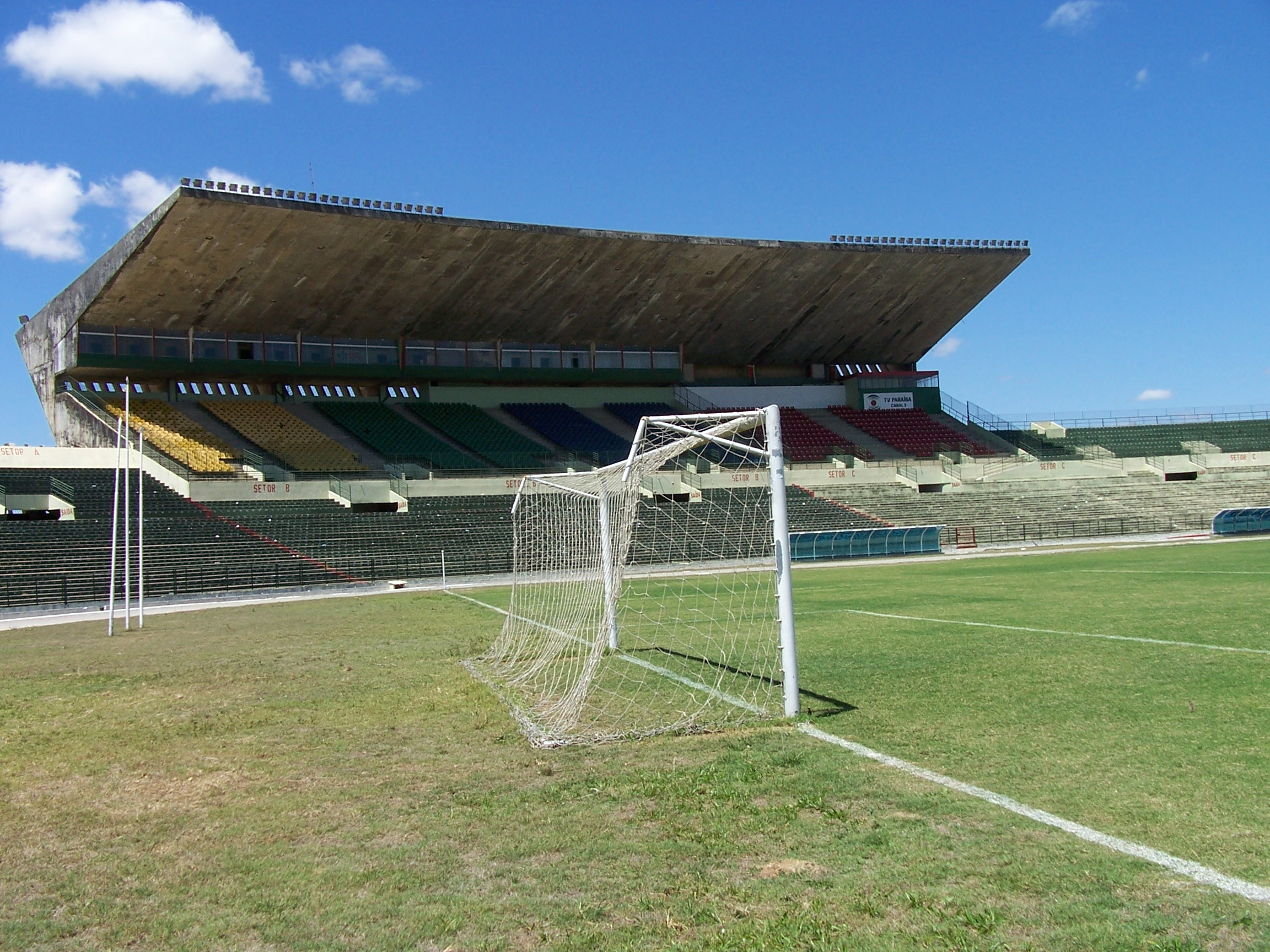
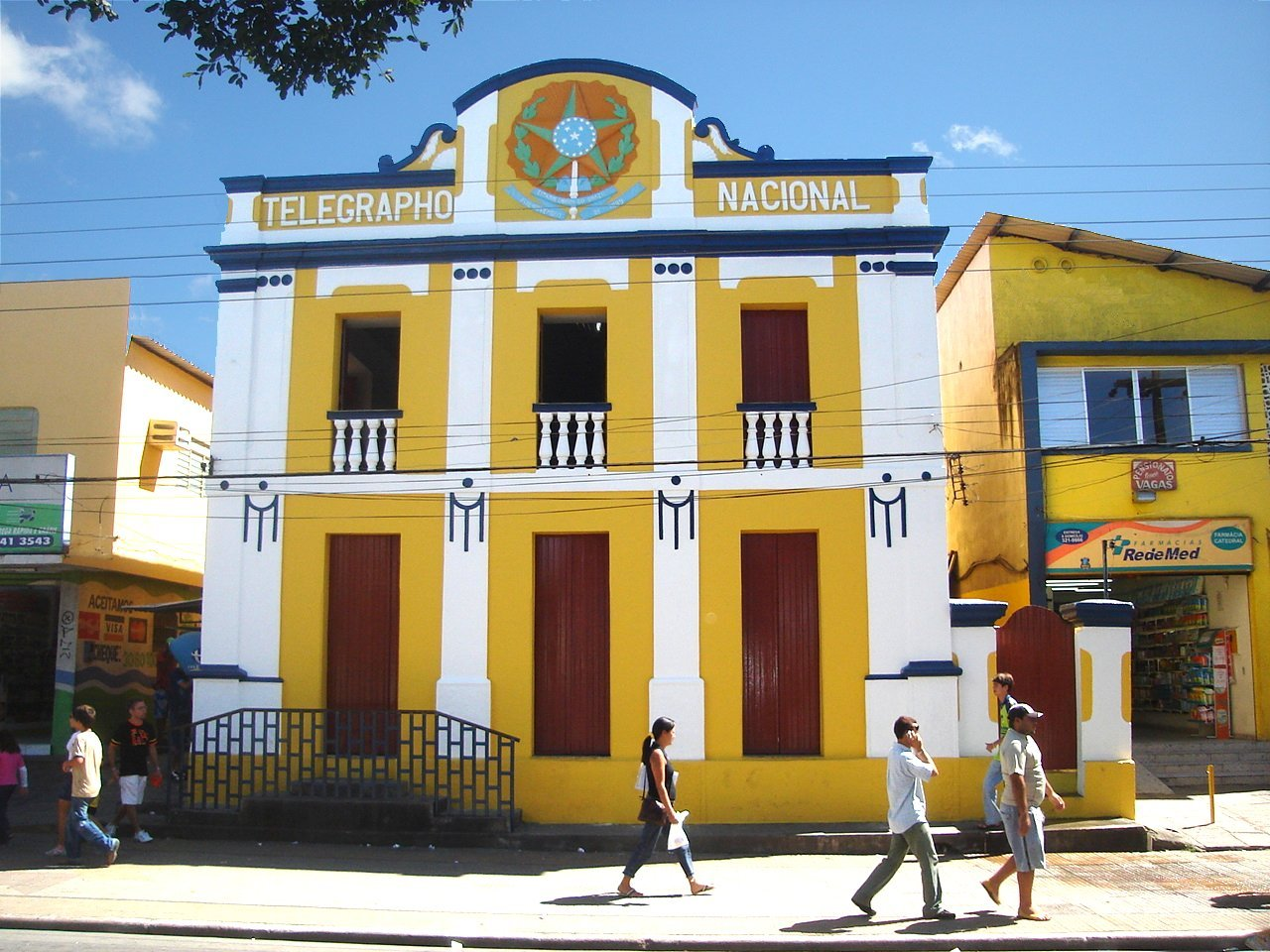
- Skyline of Campina Grande São João de Campina Grande festival Museum of Popular Arts of Paraíba Amigão Historical and Geographic Museum of Campina Grande

- Flag Coat of arms
- Motto: SOLUM INTER PLURIMA (Latin) "Unique among many"
- Location in Brazil
- Coordinates: 7°13′50″S 35°52′52″W
- Country: Brazil
- Region: Northeast
- State: Paraíba
- Macroregion: Agreste Paraibando
- Microregion: Campina Grande
- Established: October 11, 1864

Government
  - Mayor: Bruno Cunha Lima (solidariedade)

Area
  - City: 620.628 km^{2} (239.626 sq mi)
- Elevation: 560 m (1,840 ft)

Population (2022)
  - City: 419,379
  - Estimate (2025): 443,911
  - Density: 675.733/km^{2} (1,750.14/sq mi)
  - Metro: 434.101
- Time zone: UTC-3 (BRT)
- Postal code: 58400-000
- Area code: +55 83
- Website: www.campinagrande.pb.gov.br

Campina Grande (Central northeastern portuguese pronunciation: [kɐ̃ˈpinɐ ˈɡɾɐ̃di]) is the second most populous Brazilian city in the State of Paraíba after João Pessoa, the capital. It is considered to be the most important city of the Northeastern Brazilian subregion called agreste. It is considered one of the main industrial, technological and educational centers in the northeastern region of Brazil. Settled in the 17th century, the city was officially established in 1864. Campina Grande also has a large cultural agenda, including the world's largest Saint John's Festival (called O Maior São João do Mundo), which takes place during the entire month of June.

== History ==
=== Origin ===
The founding of Campina Grande is credited to Captain Teodósio de Oliveira Ledo who led a group of Ariús Indians to settle the land and begin farming on December 1, 1697. However, some historians do not agree with this version and suggest that the place was already a settlement and named Campina Grande when Teodósio arrived with the Ariús. This position is certainly supported by the fact that Campina Grande is in a critical geographic location for people travelling between the highlands and the coast.

The political actions of Teodósio in mentioning Campina Grande to the king of Portugal in May 1699 went a long way to establishing the location as place of importance.

The Ariús inhabited a small farm made up of shacks which became the first street in the new community. Later, this street was called Rua do Oriente (Street of the East) and today it is known as rua Vila Nova da Rainha (New Village of the Queen). The Cathedral of Campina Grande was constructed on one of the higher slopes in the area. It formed the Matriz plaza which later also became one of city's most important streets: Avenida Marechal Floriano Peixoto.

The village soon became a town because of the commerce it attracted and the fact that there were few settlements in Paraíba.

Campina Grande began as a small village situated in front of an old lake called Açude Velho. These people were known as tropeiros because they were traveling merchants who traded and sold goods such as meat, cotton clothes and corn flour among the cities and villages they passed by. Campina Grande became the village (Vila Nova da Rainha) that they rested in as they were coming from the coast to the west, and vice versa.

The introduction of the railroad caused this tiny village to develop into a bustling city. At the beginning of the 20th century, Campina Grande was called "The Brazilian Liverpool" because of the numerous cotton plantations and factories. At the time, it was the second biggest producer in the world.

Today, the city has added to its old and rich traditions by becoming an oasis of high technologies in the middle of northeastern Brazil.

=== The town ===
Campina Grande reached the category of town in 1790 with more than 100 houses. On April 6, 1790, it changed its name to de Vila Nova da Rainha (New Village of the Queen). At this point the town also began to have a formal government made up of a town council and Notary's office.

Although the name of the town changed, the local inhabitants continued to call the place Campina Grande. However, in official documents the name, de Vila Nova da Rainha, was the only one used.

The town's development was spurred on by the growth of the regional cotton industry which preferred to ship its product through Campina Grande.

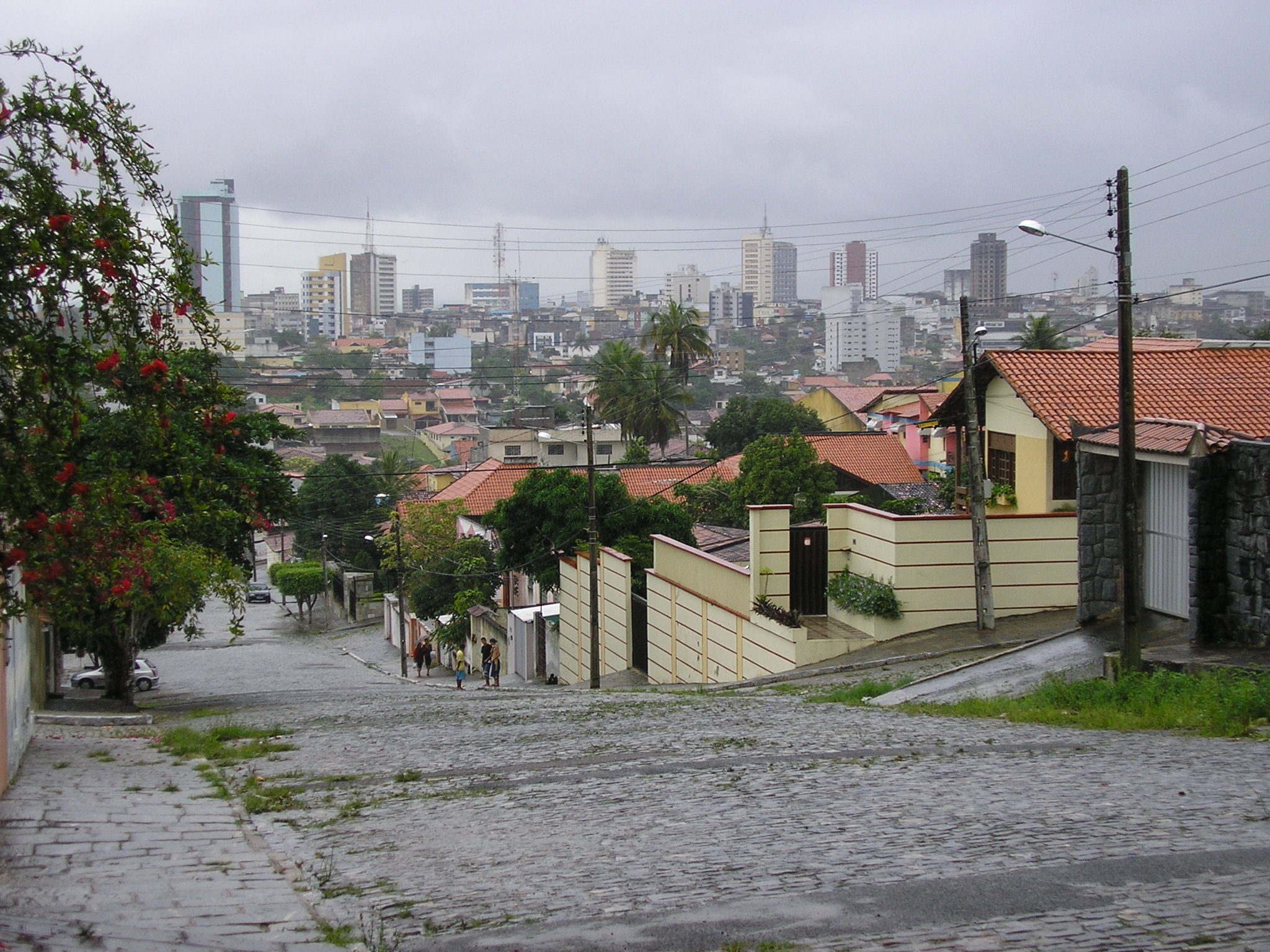
The Alto Branco neighbourhood

At this point the town included a large area of almost 900 square kilometres (350 square miles), including many smaller villages in the area.

The creation of the Village of Cabaceiras in 1835 and the Village of Alagoa Nova in 1850 reduced the area Campina Grande controlled.

In 1829, a dam across the Piabas stream was started and this became the lake referred to as Açude Velho. In 1852 the population of the town had reached 17,900 people, but in 1856, an epidemic killed almost 1,550 people. So many bodies arrived at the churches that they didn't have enough room to bury them.

=== The city ===
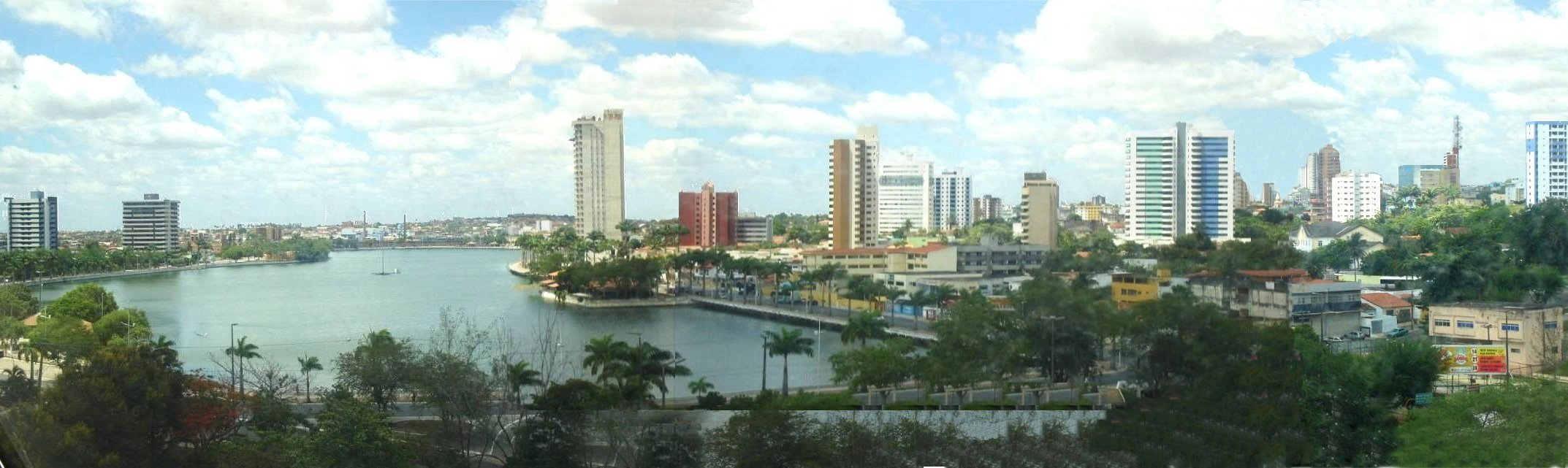
Campina Grande view

On October 11, 1864, Campina Grande was raised to the category of city. It was not the first to reach this designation though. In 1846, Areia had been designated a city and dominated the region economically, politically and culturally. Although Campina Grande was not as established as Areia, it was really not any smaller than that city. At this time, the city of Campina Grande had three plazas, four streets and about 300 houses. Of these, there still exist today the two churches: the Matriz (the cathedral) and the Church of Our Lady of the Rosary. The latter had been destroyed at one time, but was rebuilt. Although there was plenty of commercial activity, there was very little actual construction of houses and government buildings. By the end of the nineteenth century, Campina Grande still only had about 500 houses.

In the year 1864 a building was constructed for the marketing of goods. This area had many names over time: "Largo do Comércio Novo", "Praça da Uruguaiana", "Praça das Gameleiras", "Praça da Independência" and finally, "Praça Epitácio Pessoa". In 1870 a law banning the washing of clothes and animals in Açude Velho was proclaimed. On September 18, 1865, the metric system was made the official form of measurement in Campina Grande.

In 1874, a rebellion led by João Vieira occurred. João Vieira and a number of revolutionaries came down from the Bodopitá mountain range and invaded the city's market. They broke into some money boxes and destroyed a few things. The revolt spread out across the region. Over time the rebels grew in numbers and became well armed. They were led by Manoel de Barros Souza and Alexandre de Viveiros. One of the objectives of Alexandre de Viveiros was to break into the city jail and liberate all the prisoners, including the father of Manoel de Barros Souza. They also planned to set the municipal offices on fire in order to destroy all the records kept there. However, over the next number of months the police force disrupted their plans. Alexandre de Viveiros was eventually imprisoned, but João Vieirad disappeared. After the revolt, the police abused the population without cause, arresting or punishing innocent citizens. Thus, the average person suffered both from the rebels and the police.

On March 25, 1877, a new municipal building was constructed next to the cathedral. It became one of the most elegant buildings in the state and initiated an area of fine homes.

In May 1891, a theatre was constructed for the purpose of both teaching and performance. This became the Colégio Alfredo Dantas.

The city continued to gradually develop, but economic and social changes really occurred only from the early 20th century. In this period, the railroad arrived and with it came cheaper and more varied products which impacted the local economy.

== Technological centre ==
For a long time Campina Grande has had a strong technological focus. In 1967, the city was the first location in northeastern Brazil to receive a computer (at the Federal University of Campina Grande). Today, Campina Grande is a point of reference when it comes software development and computer science industries.

In April 2001, Newsweek magazine chose nine cities around the world that represented a new vision for technology. Brazil is represented on this list by Campina Grande and it was the only city chosen from Latin America. In 2003, it was mentioned again as the “Brazilian Silicon Valley,"

The reason for this success is mostly due to technological research performed by the Federal University of Campina Grande. In 1967 the university obtained support to buy its first computer for US$500,000.

Campina Grande has approximately 50 software companies that contribute about 20% of the city's total revenue.

== Main sights ==
- Libraries
  - Felix Araújo Municipal Library
  - Açude Velho Public Library
  - Campina Grande Public Library
- Cultural Centres
  - Academia Campinense de Letras
- Museums
  - Historical and Geographic museum of Campina Grande
  - Assis Chateaubriand Museum of Art
  - Museum of Cotton
  - Museum of Luiz Gonzaga
  - Museum of St. John
  - Assis Chateaubriand Museum
  - Home Marshal Anderson
- Squares and parks
  - Flag Square
  - Clementino Procópio Square
  - Açude Novo (New Dam)
  - Açude Velho (Old Dam)
  - Bodocongó Dam
  - People's Park – Where the St. John's festival (O Maior São João do Mundo) is held
  - Park of the Child
- Theatres
  - Severino Bezerra Cabral Municipal Theatre
  - Elba Ramalho Theatre
  - Rosil Cavalcanti Theatre
  - Facisa Theatre
  - Raul Priston Theatre
  - Ariano Suassuna Theatre

== Culture ==
O Maior São João do Mundo, June

The Queen of Borborema is home to the largest event in the state of Paraíba and the biggest São João celebration in the world, typically gathering 2 million people over the course of a month. The São João of Campina Grande is an annual event organized by the municipality of Campina Grande in the Brazilian state of Paraíba, held throughout the month of June. In the cultural tradition of the Brazilian Northeast, it is customary to celebrate the day of São João with performances, dances, and square dances.

The festival takes place in various venues throughout the city, with a focal point being the Parque do Povo, also known as the "headquarters of forró," situated in the city center. The event is recognized by the Ranking Brazil Institute as the largest St. John's Festival in the country.

Other events in the city:

- Meeting for the Christian Conscience (February, during Carnival)
- Meeting of the New Conscience (February, during Carnival)

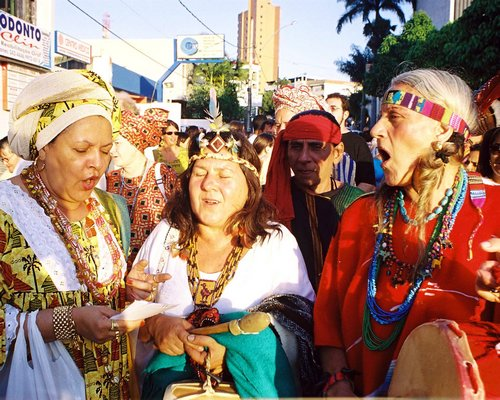
Meeting of the New Conscience.

- Vaquejada Park Ivandro Cunha Lima (March)
- Micarande (April)
- Campina Grande Winter Festival (August)
- Vaquejada Park Maria da Luz (October)
- Animal Exposition (October)
- Living Christmas Cradle (December)
- New Year's Eve on Açude Velho (December)

== Transportation ==
- Presidente João Suassuna Airport
- Argemiro de Figueiredo Bus Station – New
- Cristiano Lauritzen Bus Station – Old

== Education ==
=== Post-secondary education ===
- Federal University of Campina Grande – UFCG
- State University of Paraíba – UEPB
- Campina Grande Union of Secondary Education – UNESC (private)
- College of Applied Social Sciences – FACISA (private)
- Reinaldo Ramos Center of Secondary Education – CESREI (private)
- Acaraú Valley University – U.V.A. (private)
- English-American College (private)

== Sports ==
Sport and recreation structures in Campina Grande include:

- Plínio Lemos Sports Complex
- The Meninão Gymnasium
- Amigão Stadium
- Renatão Stadium home stadium of the Campinense Clube
- President Vargas Stadium, home stadium of the Treze Futebol Clube

Local teams include:

- Campinense Clube
- Treze Futebol Clube
- Grêmio Serrano
- Associação Desportiva Perilima
- Associação Atlética Leonel

== Neighborhoods ==
Map of Campina Grande neighborhoods

- Acácio Figueiredo
- Alto Branco
- Araxá
- Bairro das Cidades
- Bairros das Nações
- Bela Vista
- Bodocongó
- Cachoeira
- Araxá
- Castelo Branco
- Catolé
- Centenário
- Centro
- Conceição
- Cruzeiro
- Cuités
- Dinamérica
- Distrito Industrial
- Estação Velha
- Glória
- Itararé
- Jardim Borborema
- Jardim Continental
- Jardim Paulistano
- Jardim Tavares
- Jeremias
- José Pinheiro
- Lauritzen
- Liberdade
- Louzeiro
- Malvinas
- Mirante
- Monte Castelo
- Monte Santo
- Nova Brasília
- Novo Bodocongó
- Palmeira
- Pedregal
- Prata
- Presidente Médice
- Quarenta
- Ramadinha
- Sandra Cavalcante
- Santa Cruz
- Santa Rosa
- Santo Antônio
- São José
- Serrotão
- Tambor
- Três Irmãs
- Universitário
- Velame
- Vila Cabral

== Economy ==
According to 1996 statistics from the Instituto de Pesquisa Econômica Aplicada, the Gross Internal Product was estimated at R$591.93 million: 3.3% came through agricultural and livestock based activities, 19.8% came through industry, and 76.9% was the result of the commerce and service sectors. The yield per capita was of R$1.717.09.

By 2002 the Brazilian Institute of Geography and Statistics estimated that the Gross Internal Product to have grown to R$1.600 billion and the yield per capita to R$4,387.00.

== Local government ==
Campina Grande has 255,282 eligible voters distributed among 598 sections and four electoral districts.

The first election in 1878 had 34 eligible voters.

The office of Municipal mayor was created on March 2, 1895, by State Law. The first mayor of Campina Grande was Francisco Camilo of Araújo. People began to have the opportunity to vote for the mayor directly only from 1947.

== Statistics ==
=== Education ===
IBGE (2003)
Schools	Students registered	Professors
Primary	80,427	3,688
Middle	19,764	1,108

- Illiteracy rate: 17.12%.

=== HDI ===
UNHD (2000)
HDI	1991	2000
Value	0.615	0.678
Life expectancy	0.585	0.641
Education	0.741	0.844
Total	0.647	0.721

=== Urban sanitation ===
IBGE (2000)
Service	Residences(%)
Water	96.6%
Sanitary Sewers	81.0%
Garbage Collection	94.6%

=== Health ===
- 2,634 hospital beds of which 2,148 are for free public health (2003, IBGE).
- Infant mortality: 76.6 persons/million (Ministry of Health/1998).
- Life expectancy: 63.5 years (IBGE, Census 2000).

=== Distances ===
Distances
City	km
Aracaju	541
Caruaru	75
Fortaleza	709
Maceió	374
Natal	270
Recife	191
Rio de Janeiro	2,378
Salvador	879
São Luís	1,530
São Paulo	2,700

== Geography ==
=== Flora ===
A list of 15 plants commonly found in the Campina Grande area. Of the 132 species of trees found, 51.2% originate from other countries and 32.8% are native species.

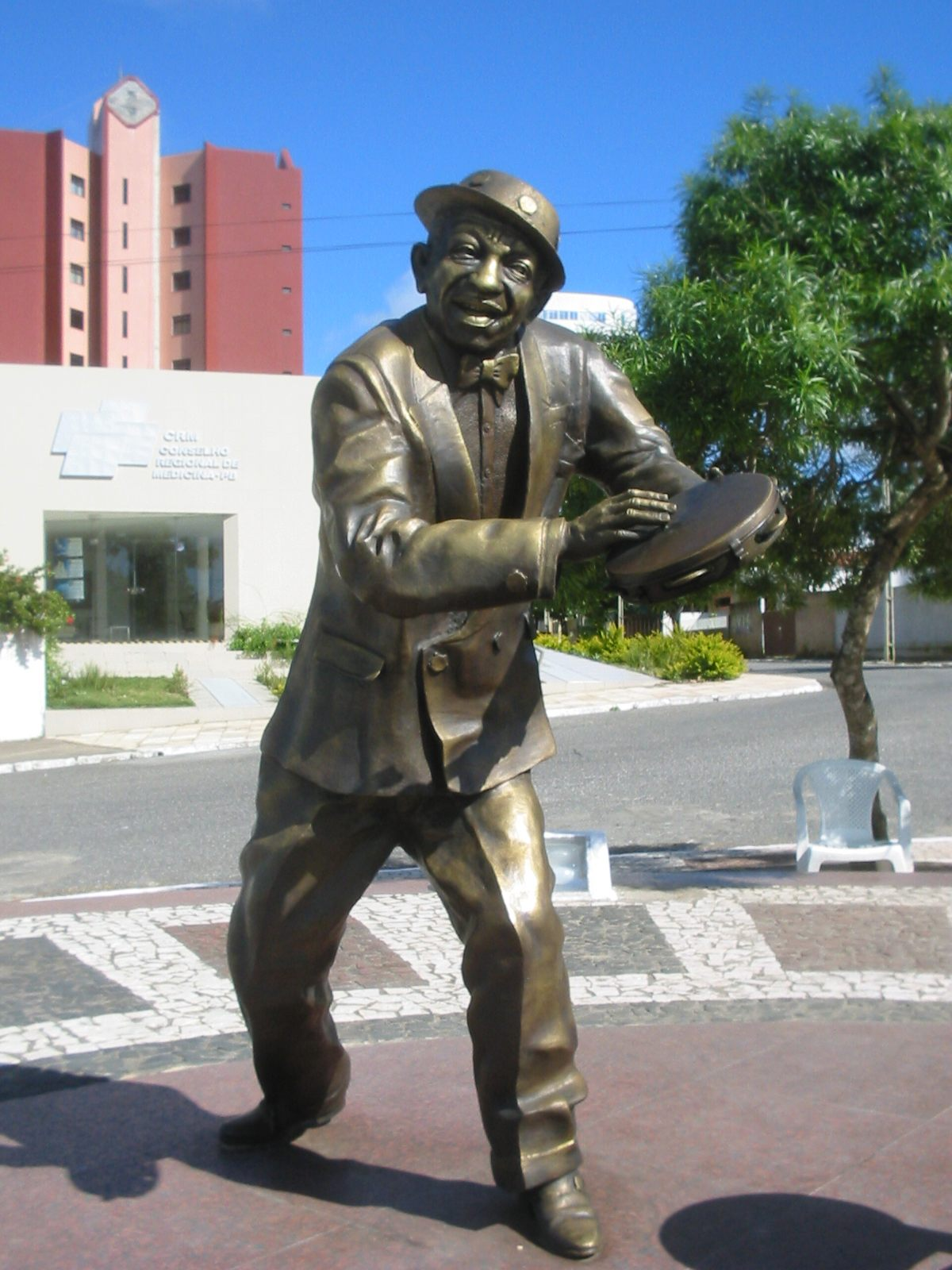
Statue of Jackson do Pandeiro in Campina Grande.

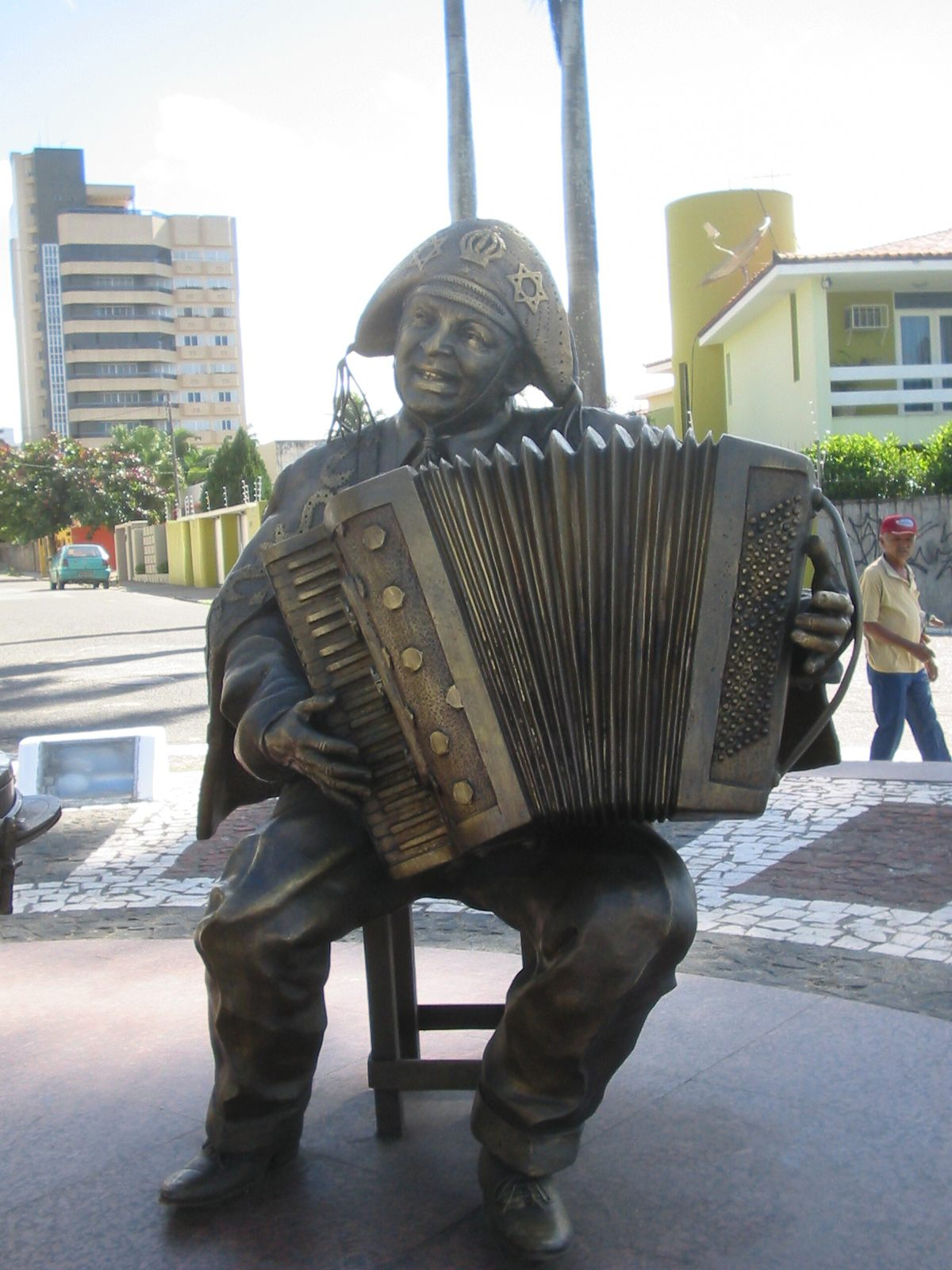
Statue of Luiz Gonzaga located in Campina Grande.

Scientific name	Popular Name
Senna siamea	Yellow Cássia
Prosopis juliflora DC	Algaroba
Clitoria fairchildiana Howard	Sombreiro
Terminalia catappa Linn	Castanet
Pithecellobium dulce	Hunger Killer
Pachira aquatica Aubl	Cocoa-bravo
Tabebuia chrysantha	Yellow Ipê
Delonix regia Raff	Flamboyant Tree
Licania tomentosa (Benth) Fritsch.	Oitizeiro
Ficus benjamina L	Benjamina Fig
Syzygium cumini DC.	Jambul
Roystonea oleracea Cook	Imperial Palm Tree
Schinus terebinthifolius Raddi	Aroeira-da-praia
Spathodea campanulata	Espatódia
Adenanthera pavonina L.	Brazil Cássia

=== Climate ===
Campina Grande has a dry-summer tropical savanna climate (Köppen: As) that borders on a hot semi-arid climate (Köppen: BSh).

Climate data for Campina Grande (1981–2010)
Month	Jan	Feb	Mar	Apr	May	Jun	Jul	Aug	Sep	Oct	Nov	Dec	Year
Record high °C (°F)	34.1 (93.4)	34.2 (93.6)	34.6 (94.3)	33.2 (91.8)	32.8 (91.0)	31.9 (89.4)	29.7 (85.5)	29.7 (85.5)	31.7 (89.1)	33.5 (92.3)	33.1 (91.6)	33.8 (92.8)	34.6 (94.3)
Mean daily maximum °C (°F)	30.7 (87.3)	30.5 (86.9)	30.1 (86.2)	29.1 (84.4)	27.7 (81.9)	26.0 (78.8)	25.6 (78.1)	26.3 (79.3)	28.0 (82.4)	29.8 (85.6)	30.5 (86.9)	30.8 (87.4)	28.8 (83.8)
Daily mean °C (°F)	24.7 (76.5)	24.7 (76.5)	24.7 (76.5)	24.3 (75.7)	23.4 (74.1)	22.1 (71.8)	21.5 (70.7)	21.5 (70.7)	22.5 (72.5)	23.5 (74.3)	24.2 (75.6)	24.5 (76.1)	23.5 (74.3)
Mean daily minimum °C (°F)	21.2 (70.2)	21.3 (70.3)	21.4 (70.5)	21.1 (70.0)	20.5 (68.9)	19.3 (66.7)	18.6 (65.5)	18.5 (65.3)	19.0 (66.2)	19.9 (67.8)	20.4 (68.7)	20.9 (69.6)	20.2 (68.4)
Record low °C (°F)	18.5 (65.3)	19.1 (66.4)	18.2 (64.8)	18.7 (65.7)	16.0 (60.8)	16.2 (61.2)	15.3 (59.5)	15.3 (59.5)	16.1 (61.0)	17.3 (63.1)	18.1 (64.6)	17.7 (63.9)	15.3 (59.5)
Average rainfall mm (inches)	45.6 (1.80)	62.8 (2.47)	107.1 (4.22)	89.3 (3.52)	101.7 (4.00)	123.6 (4.87)	96.7 (3.81)	80.1 (3.15)	30.0 (1.18)	12.5 (0.49)	12.3 (0.48)	15.3 (0.60)	777 (30.59)
Average rainy days (≥ 1.0 mm)	6	6	8	10	13	15	12	11	5	3	2	3	94
Average relative humidity (%)	74.3	75.0	77.4	79.2	81.6	84.0	82.9	80.3	74.7	71.3	71.0	72.0	77.0
Mean monthly sunshine hours	239.3	213.7	227.8	203.9	184.4	149.3	163.7	197.2	236.9	270.1	265.6	247.0	2,598.9
Source: Instituto Nacional de Meteorologia

== Notable people ==
- Genival Lacerda, singer
- Hulk, footballer
- Mike Deodato, Comic Book Artist
- Bethe Correia, mixed martial artist
- Thaciano, footballer
- Aderbar Melo dos Santos Neto, footballer
- Valdeno Brito, racing driver
