= Genival Lacerda =

Brazilian singer (1931–2021)

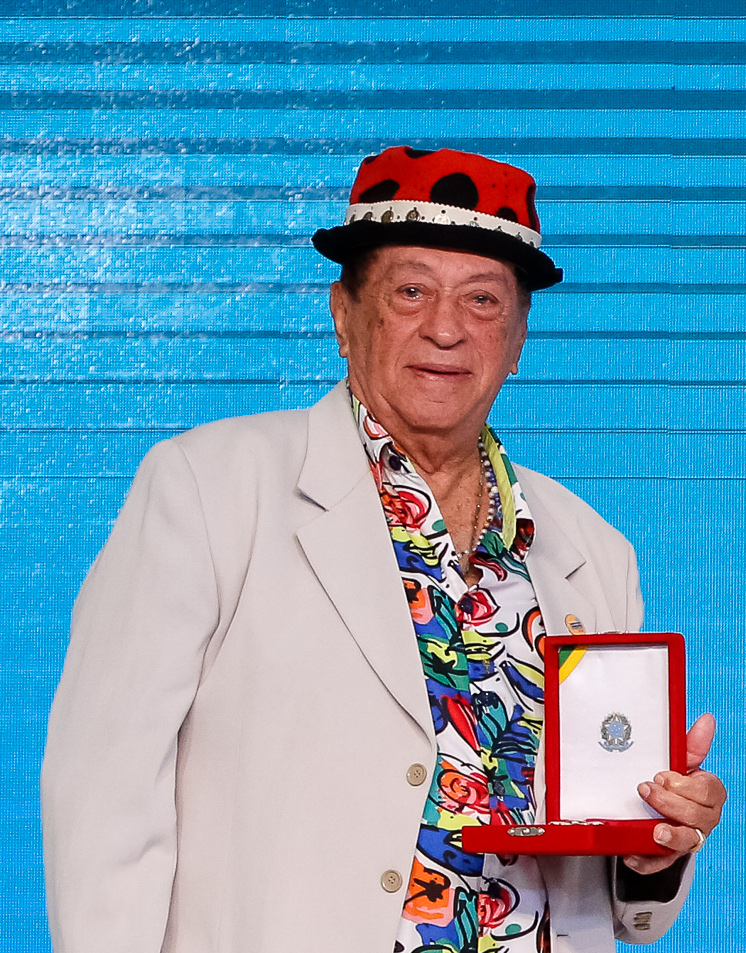
Genival Lacerda in 2017, holding his Order of Cultural Merit.

Genival Lacerda Cavalcante (5 April 1931 – 7 January 2021) was a Brazilian forró singer-songwriter.

== Life and career ==
Lacerda was born in Campina Grande, Paraíba. His main hits are Severina Xique-Xique recorded in 1975, Radinho de Pilha and O Chevette da Menina released in 2010.

In December 2017 he was awarded by the Brazilian government the Order of Cultural Merit.

== Death ==
Lacerda died on 7 January 2021, at age 89, in Recife, Pernambuco, of complications resulting from COVID-19 during the COVID-19 pandemic in Brazil.
