= Jardim Paulistano (Campina Grande) =

Jardim Paulistano is a quarter of the city of Campina Grande, Paraíba, Brazil. It is in the South Zone of the city.

== Neighboring quarters ==
- Liberdade, to the north
- Cruzeiro, to the west
- Distrito Industrial, to the south
- Tambor, to the east
