= Dâmina Pereira =

Brazilian politician

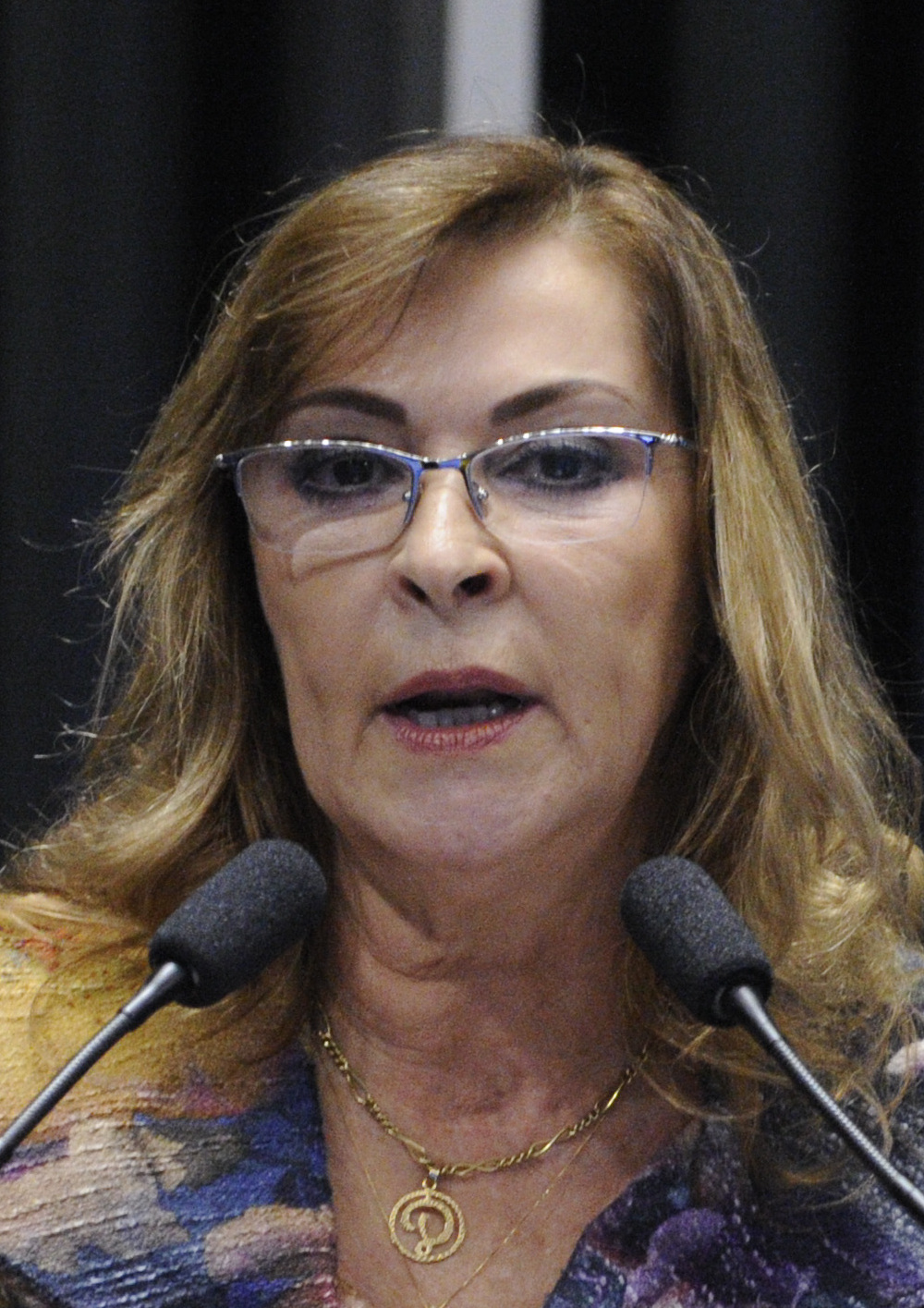
- Pereira in 2016

Federal Deputy from Minas Gerais
- In office 1 February 2015 – 31 January 2019

Personal details
- Born: 2 December 1952 (age 73) Lavras, MG, Brazil
- Party: PODE (2018–); PSL (2016–2018); PMB (2015–2016); PMN (2014–2015)

Dâmina de Carvalho Pereira (born 2 December 1952) is a Brazilian politician and businesswoman. She has spent her political career representing Minas Gerais, having served as federal deputy representative from 2015 to 2019.

== Personal life ==
Pereira was born to Joao Pereira de Carvalho and Waldette Rodrigues de Carvalho. Before becoming a politician Pereira worked as a businesswoman.

== Political career ==
Pereira voted in favor of the impeachment of then-president Dilma Rousseff. She voted in favor of 2015 tax reforms but against the 2017 Brazilian labor reform, and would vote against the opening of a corruption investigation into Rousseff's successor Michel Temer.

Pereira is the first woman to be elected to the chamber of deputies from the municipality of Lavras. Originally elected as a member of the Party of National Mobilization, Pereira joined the Party of the Brazilian Woman in 2015, then the Social Liberal Party the following year. In 2018 she joined Podemos.
