= Ivandro Cunha Lima =

Brazilian lawyer and politician (1930–2022)

Ivandro Cunha Lima (26 May 1930 – 28 May 2022) was a Brazilian politician who served as a Senator.
