= Natal, Rio Grande do Norte =

Capital city of Rio Grande do Norte, Brazil

Natal
- Municipality
- Municipality of Natal
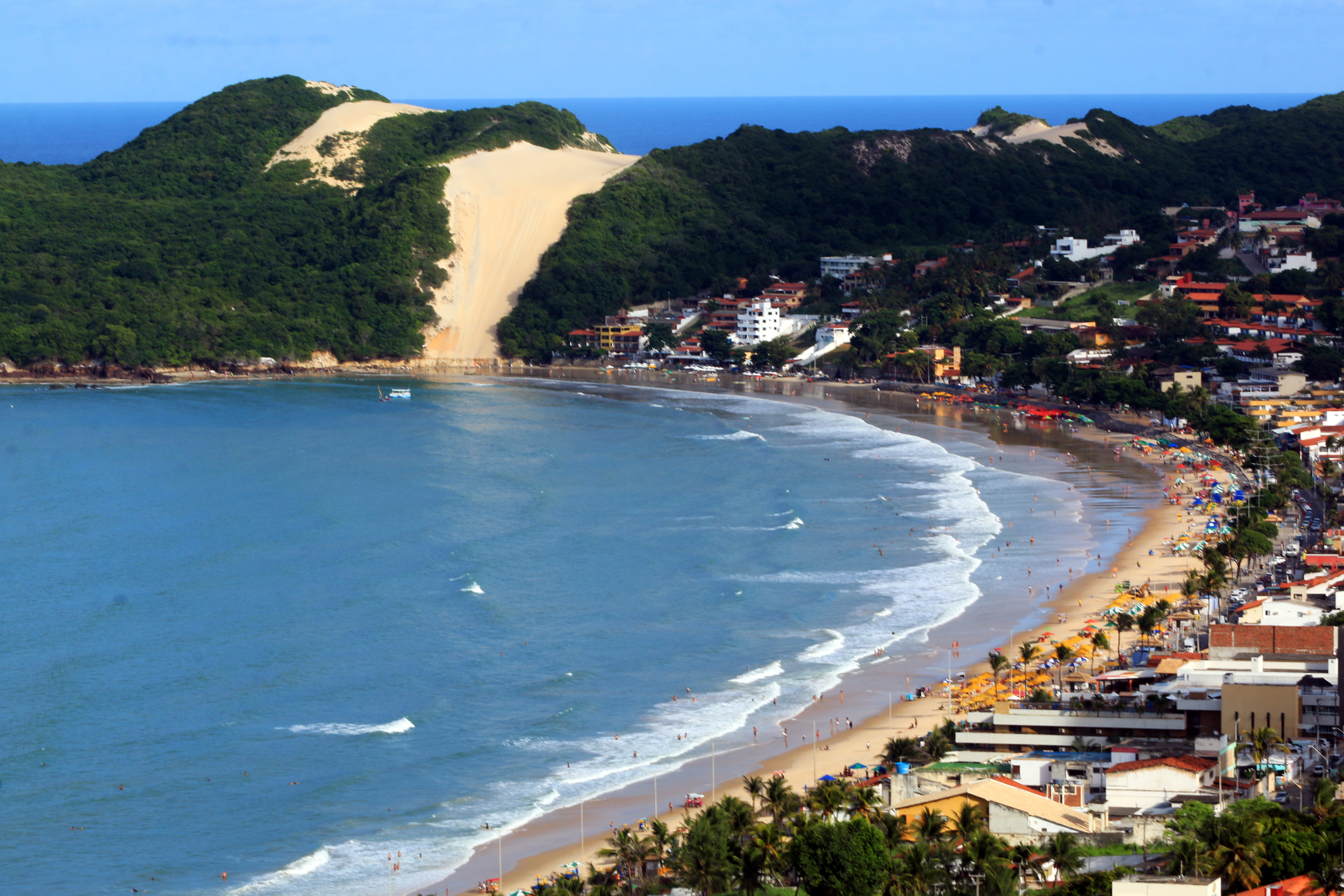
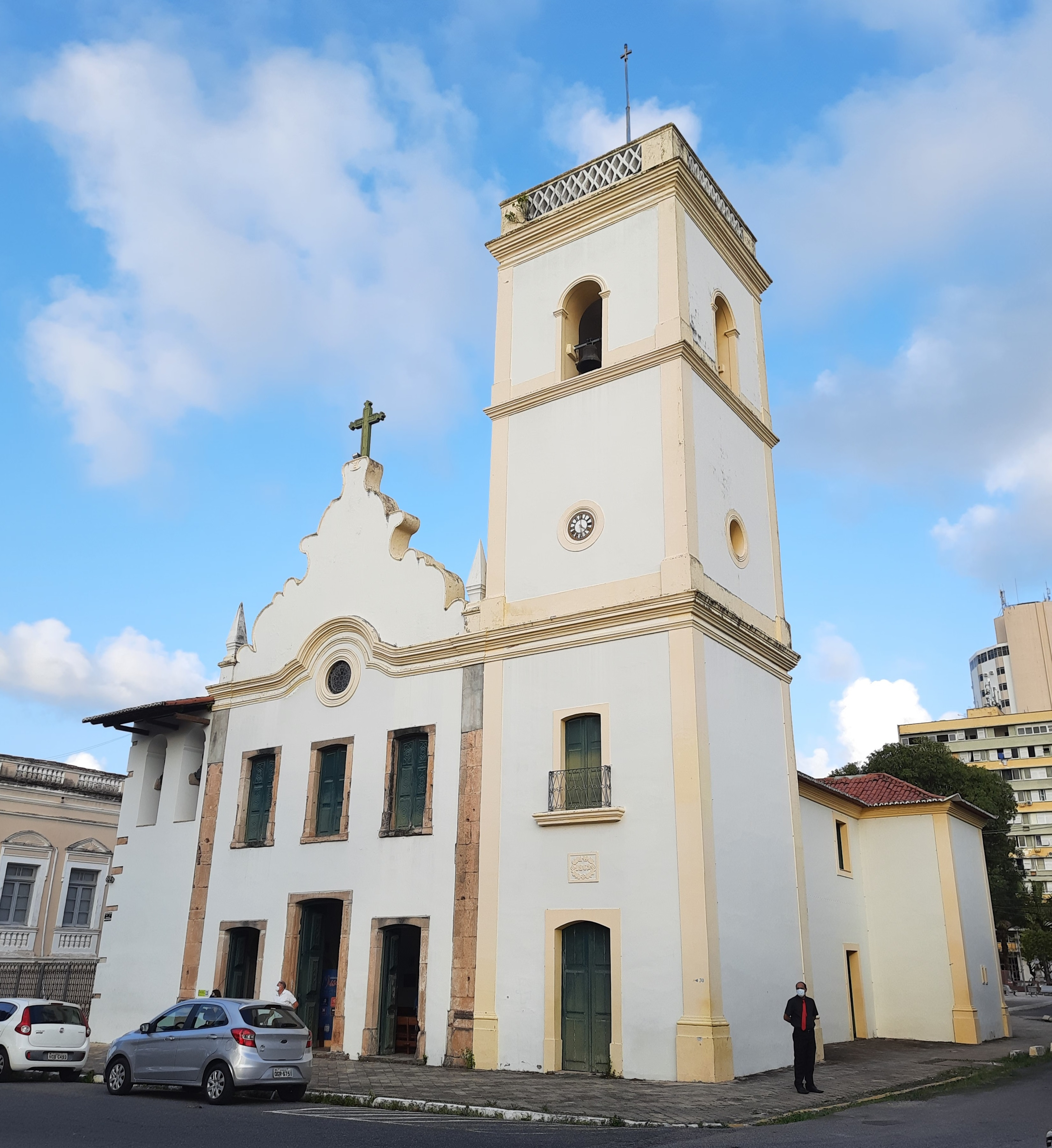
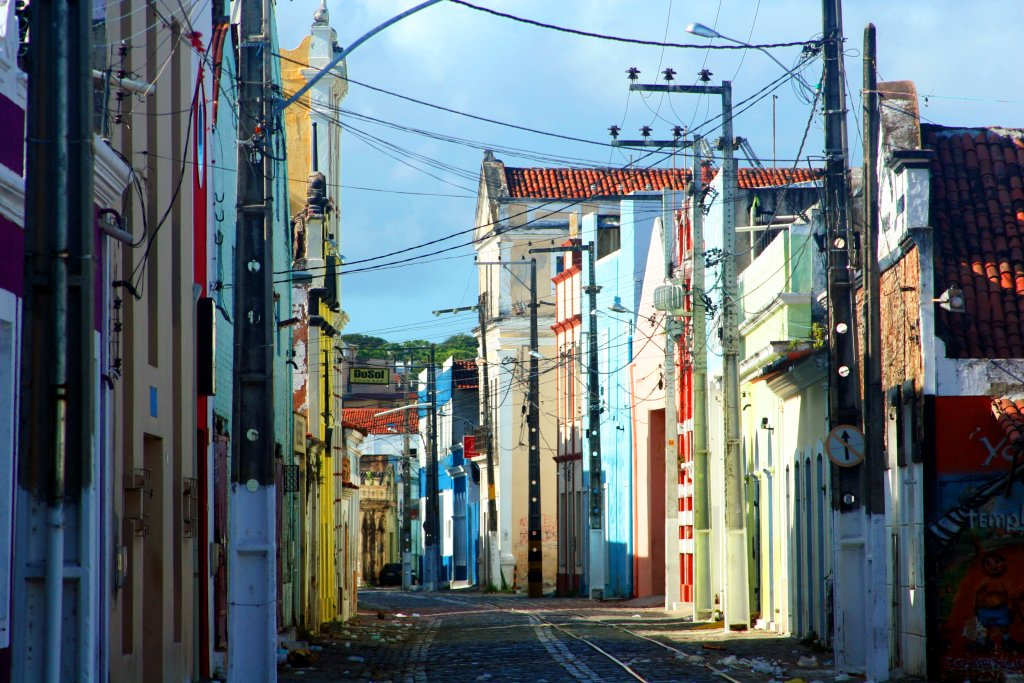
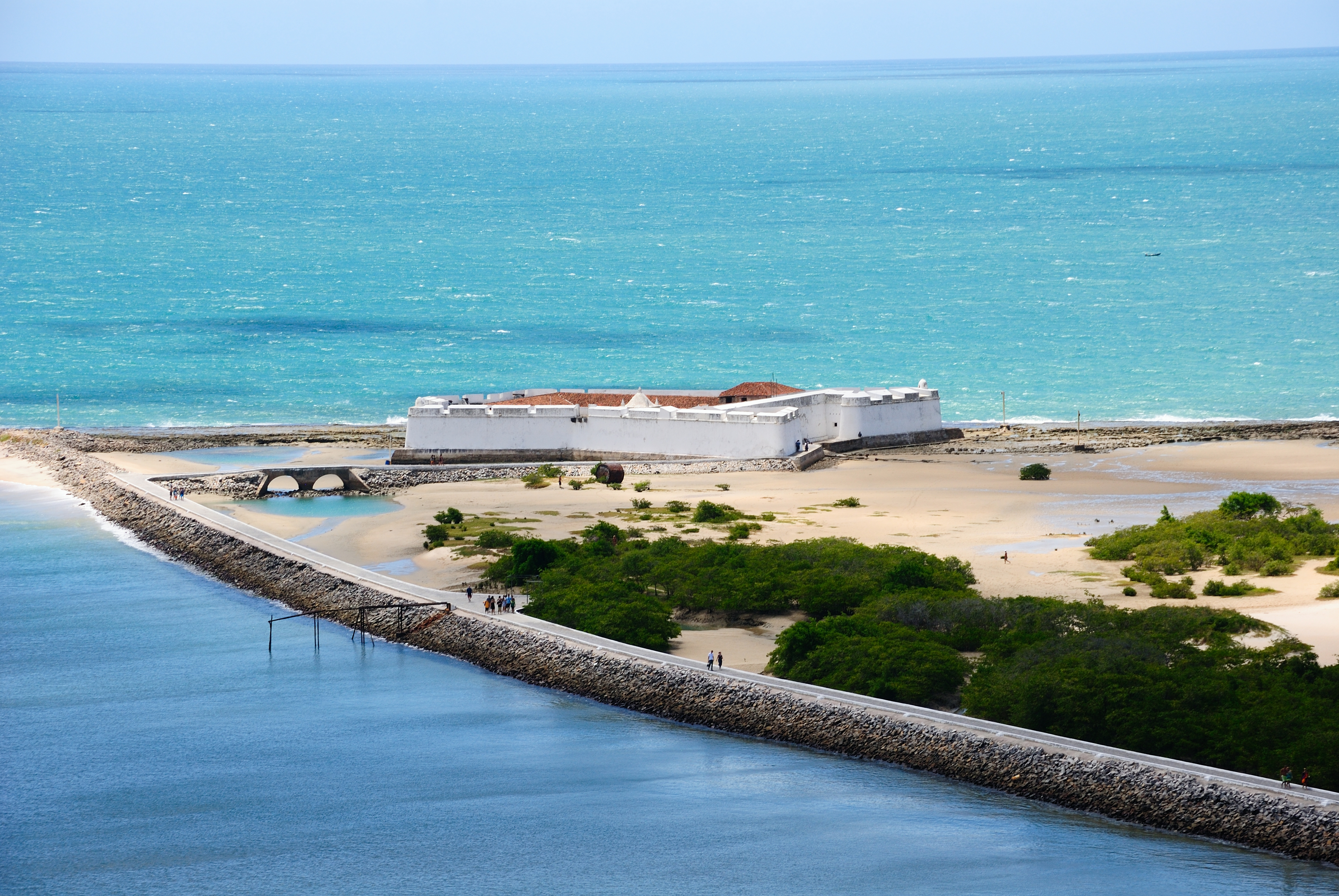
- Skyline Morro do Careca and Ponta Negra beach Parish Church of Our Lady of the Presentation Chile Street in the Ribeira neighborhood Fort of the Three Wise Men Newton Navarro Bridge at the mouth of the Potengi River

- Flag Coat of arms
- Nicknames: "A Noiva do Sol" ("The Sun's Bride"), "Cidade do Sol" ("The City of the Sun") and "Cidade das Dunas" ("The City of Dunes")
- Anthem

- Location within Brazil Location within South America
- Coordinates: 05°47′S 35°12′W
- Country: Brazil
- Region: Northeast
- State: Rio Grande do Norte
- Founded: 25 December 1599

Government
  - Mayor: Paulinho Freire (União Brasil)

Area
  - Municipality: 167.3 km^{2} (64.6 sq mi)
- Elevation: 30 m (98 ft)

Population (2025)
  - Municipality: 784,249
  - Density: 4,688/km^{2} (12,140/sq mi)
  - Metro: 1,520,000
- Time zone: UTC-3
- Postal code: 59000-001 to 59139-999
- Area code: +55 84
- HDI (2026): 0.822 – very high
- Website: www.natal.rn.gov.br

Natal (Brazilian Portuguese: [naˈtaw]) is a Brazilian municipality and the capital of the state of Rio Grande do Norte, located in the Northeast Region of Brazil. Situated 2,227 kilometers from Brasília, the federal capital, it is the second smallest Brazilian state capital in area, covering an area of approximately 167 km^{2} (64 sq mi). With just over 750,000 inhabitants (2022), it is the most populous municipality in its state, the eighth in the Northeast, and the 24th in Brazil. The Greater Natal, composed of thirteen other municipalities in Rio Grande do Norte, has more than 1.5 million inhabitants, making it the fourth largest urban agglomeration in the Northeast and the nineteenth largest in Brazil.

Founded on Christmas Day in 1599 on the banks of the Potengi River, which separates the North Zone from the others, the city was occupied by the Dutch between 1633 and 1654, during which it was named New Amsterdam. Its growth was slow during the first three centuries of its existence. Only from the 20th century onward did Natal undergo an intense modernization process, and beginning with World War II, its population began to grow at a faster pace, especially throughout the 1970s and 1980s.

Its location near the "corner of South America" caught the attention of the United States Department of War, which considered Natal "one of the four most strategic points in the world." With the start of operations at the first rocket launch base in South America — the Barreira do Inferno Launch Center in Parnamirim — Natal became known as the "Space Capital of Brazil." The construction of the Via Costeira, a coastal highway between the Atlantic Ocean and Natal Dunes State Park that connects the beaches of Areia Preta and Ponta Negra, greatly boosted local tourism.

== History ==
=== Background, foundation and Dutch occupation ===
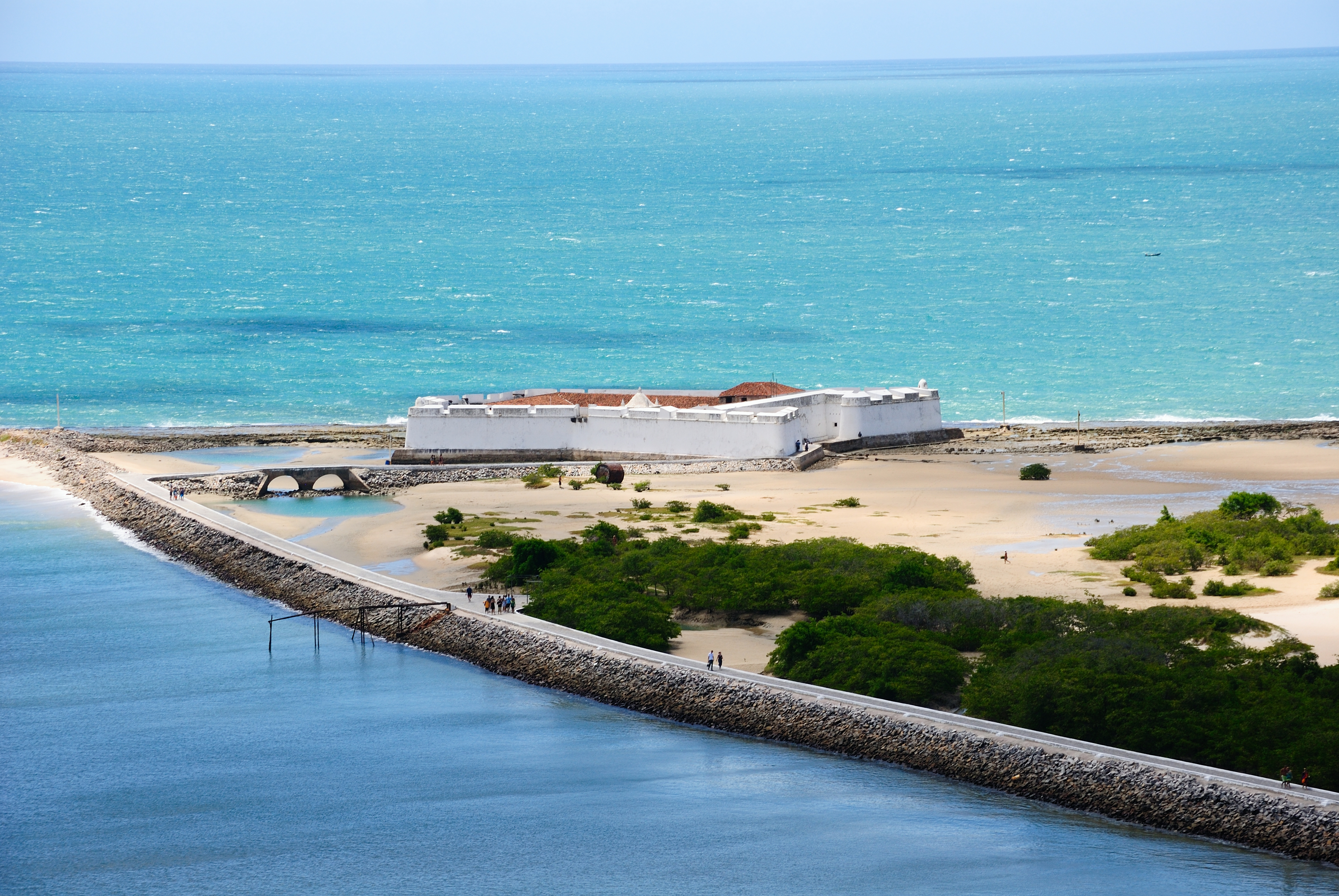
Fort of the Three Wise Men, landmark of the city's founding, photographed from the Newton Navarro Bridge

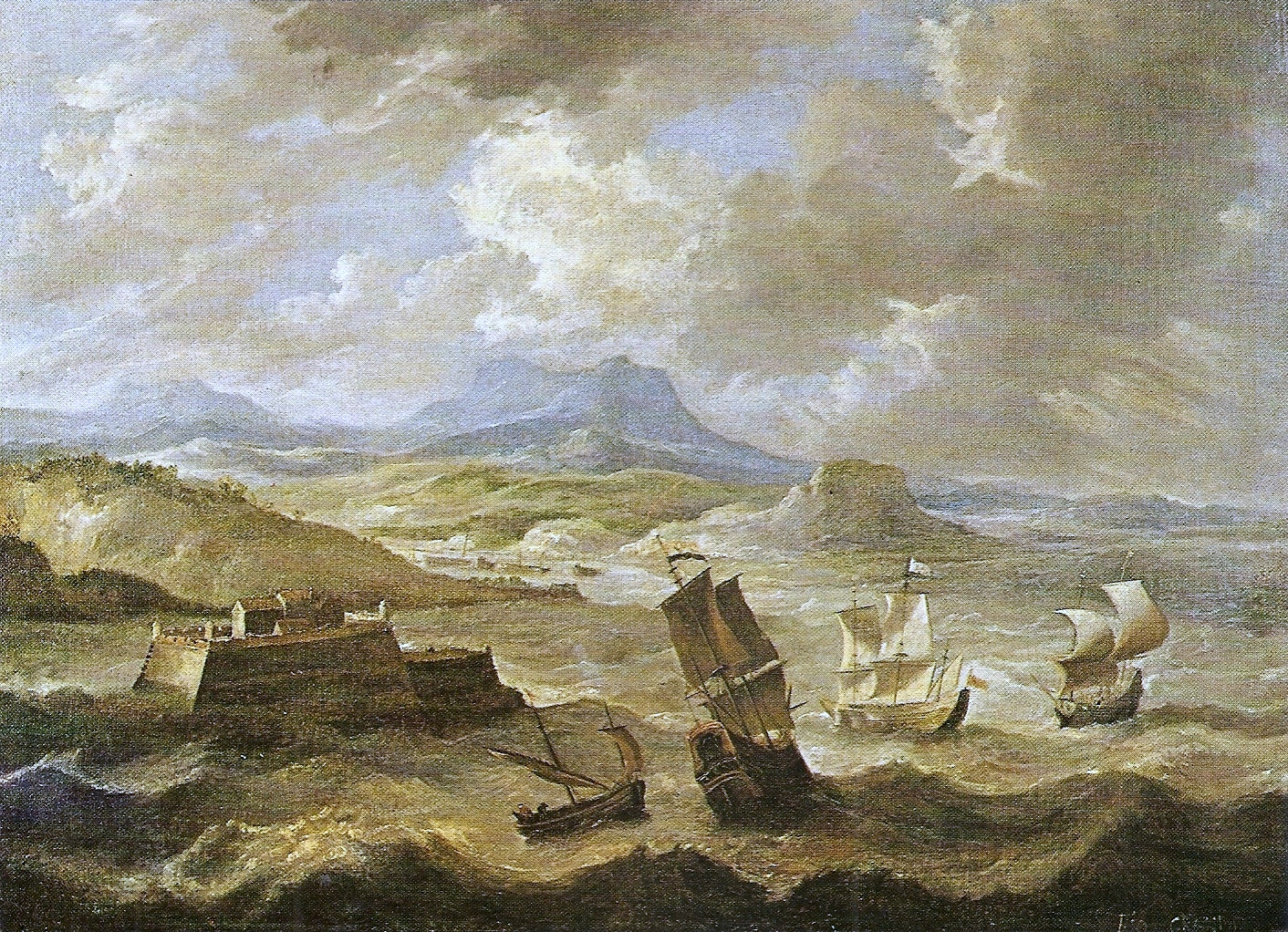
The Fort of the Three Wise Men, by Gillis Peeters

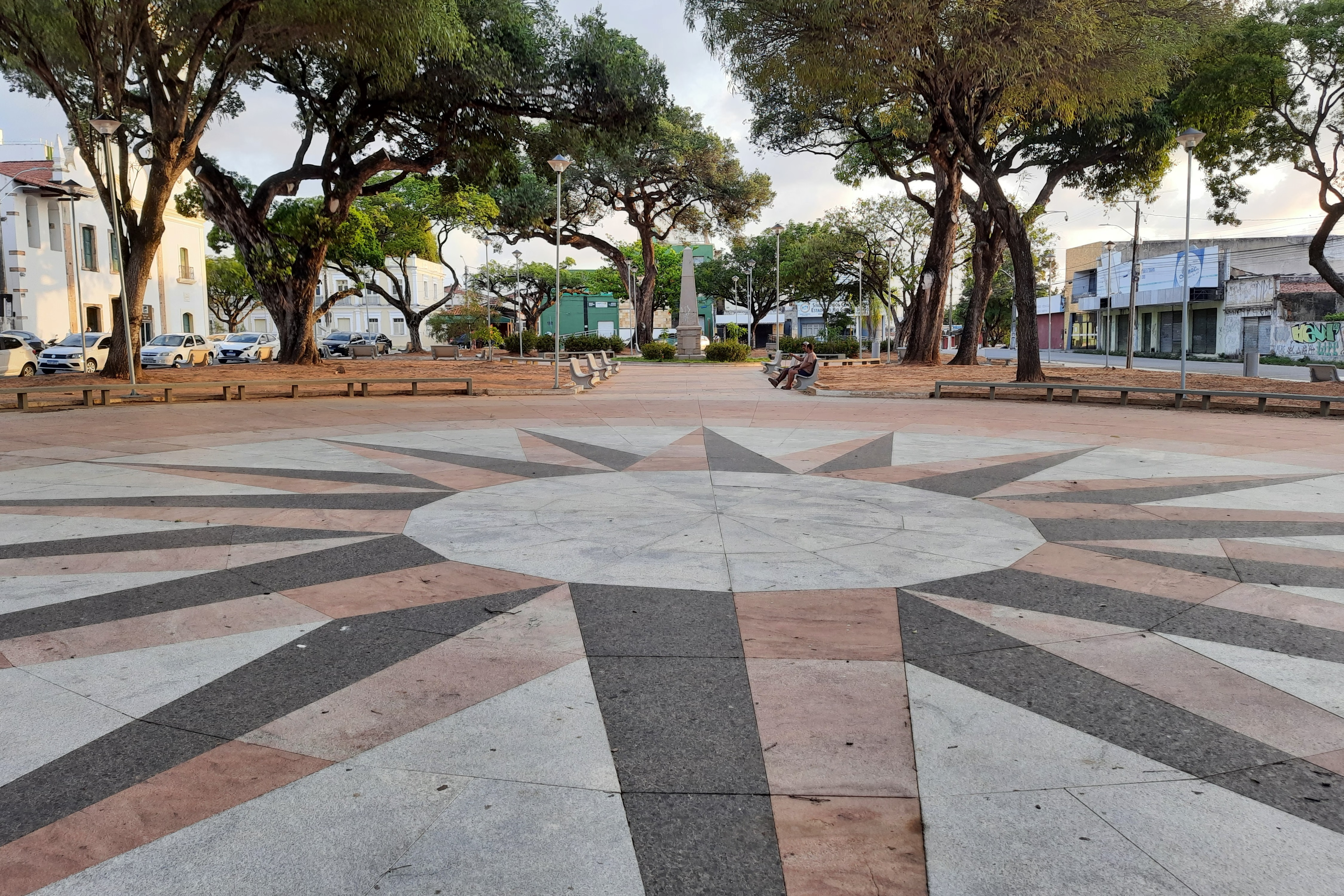
André de Albuquerque Square, Natal's zero milestone

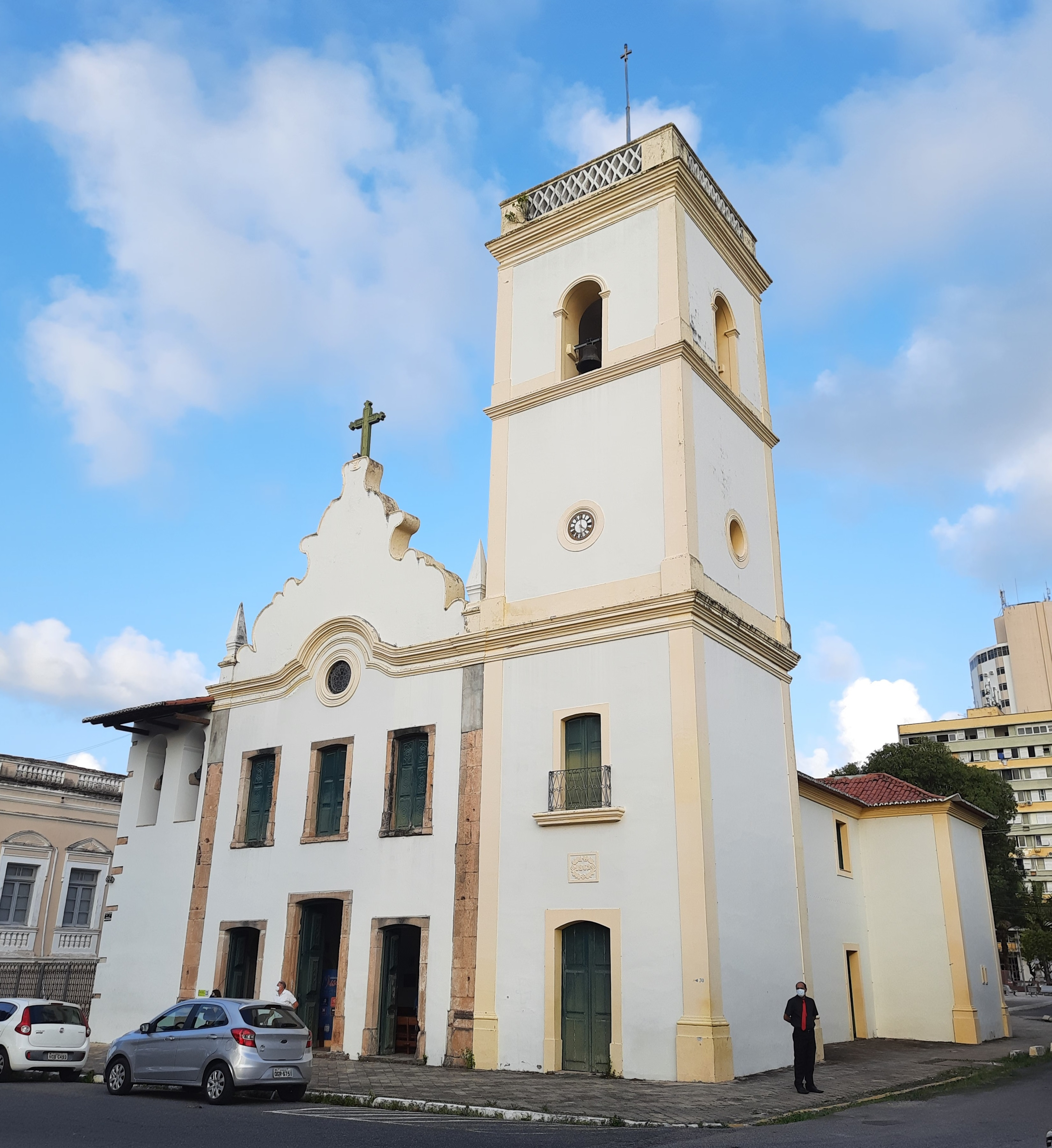
Parish Church of Our Lady of the Presentation, former Metropolitan Cathedral

The history of Natal is closely intertwined with that of the Rio Grande do Norte. The Captaincy of Rio Grande began in 1535, with the arrival of a fleet commanded by Aires da Cunha, acting on behalf of the donatary João de Barros and the King of Portugal. The goal was to colonize the region, a task made difficult by the fierce resistance of the Potiguara Indigenous people and French pirates who traded brazilwood. Thus began the historical trajectory of the area located at the "corner" of South America.

On 25 December 1597, a new squadron entered the mouth of what is now the Potengi River. The first measure taken by the expeditionaries was to secure themselves against attacks from Indigenous groups and French corsairs. Twelve days later, on 6 January 1598, construction began on the Barra do Rio Grande Fortress (later known as the Fortress of the Three Wise Men), which was completed on 24 June of the same year.

The following year, on 25 December 1599, a mass was celebrated where the Parish Church of Our Lady of the Presentation now stands, marking the foundation of Natal. The original urban perimeter was demarcated by two crosses — from the current Mothers Square (northern limit) to Santa Cruz da Bica Square (southern limit), both located in the Cidade Alta (Upper City).

There is no consensus among historians regarding the true founder of the city, as historical documents about Natal's foundation were destroyed during the Dutch occupation of Rio Grande do Norte. Some historians credit Jerônimo de Albuquerque, while others attribute the founding to Manuel de Mascarenhas Homem. However, the historian from Natal, Luís da Câmara Cascudo, in his book História do Rio Grande do Norte (1955), identifies João Rodrigues Colaço as the founder of the city:

(...) Jerônimo d’Albuquerque was no longer in command in March or April 1599, and by January 9, 1600 — fifteen days after the founding of the city — Colaço was captain of the fortress and had conducted fieldwork showing his authority in the area. Thus, all evidence seems to invalidate the tradition that Jerônimo d’Albuquerque founded the city of Natal, and that honor, at least provisionally, belongs to João Rodrigues Colaço.

In 1601, by decree of the Portuguese Crown, the Parish of Our Lady of the Presentation was created — the first parish in Rio Grande do Norte.

In 1631, a fleet of fourteen ships departed from Recife and landed in Ponta Negra, intending to conquer the Captaincy of Rio Grande, but the attempt failed. Only in December 1633 did the Dutch occupation truly begin, when Dutch forces arrived in Natal, wounded the captain-major Pero Mendes Gouveia, and seized the Barra do Rio Grande Fortress, renaming it Castle of Keulen. The fortress, previously built of clay, was reconstructed in masonry, and Natal was renamed New Amsterdam, in reference to the Dutch capital.

The occupation ended only in 1654, when the Dutch were expelled by the Portuguese and New Amsterdam regained its original name, Natal. In 1661, the Netherlands officially recognized Portuguese sovereignty over northeastern Brazil through the Treaty of The Hague. After the occupation, the Portuguese resumed control of the territory, expanding inland. However, this process was far from peaceful, as many Indigenous peoples were persecuted and decimated. Stability in the Captaincy of Rio Grande would only come at the end of the 17th century, under the governance of Bernardo Vieira de Melo.

=== From the 18th to the 19th century ===
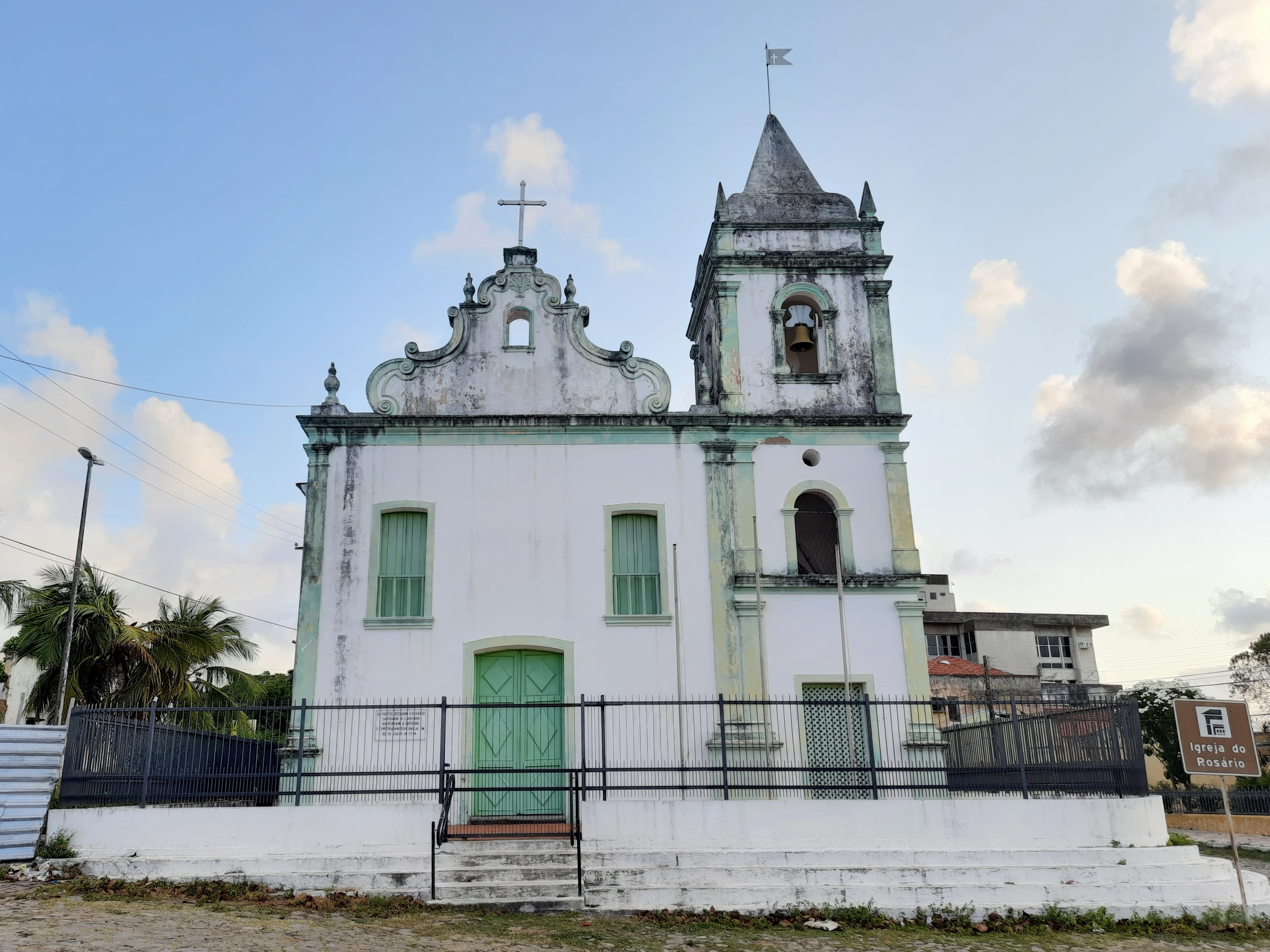
The Church of Our Lady of the Rosary of the Blacks, the second oldest Catholic church in the city, was listed as a historical landmark in 1987

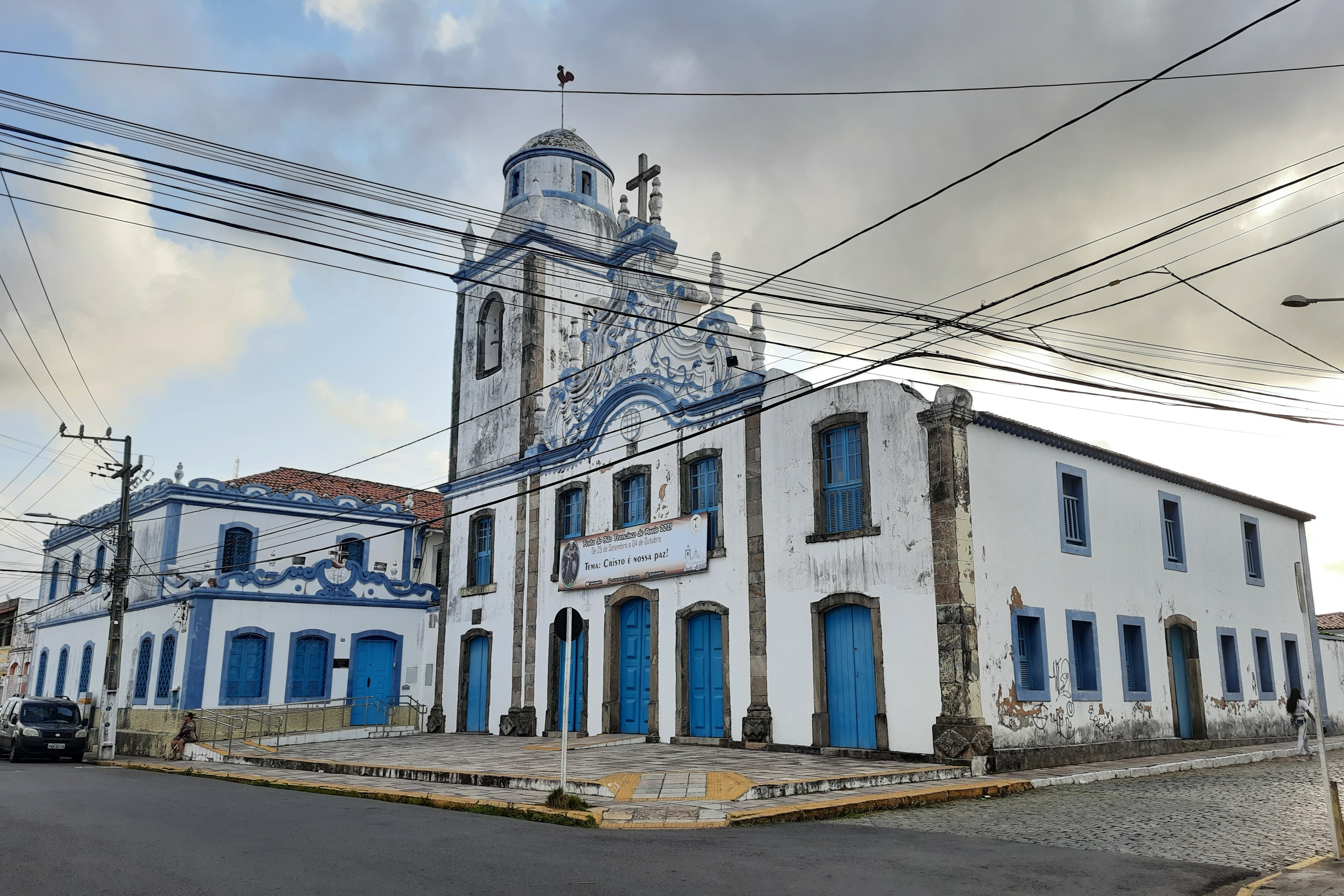
The Church of Saint Anthony, known as "Church of the Rooster," and the Museum of Sacred Art, which contains exhibitions of various objects related to the religious art of Rio Grande do Norte

At the beginning of the 18th century, construction began on the Church of Our Lady of the Rosary of the Black People, completed in 1714. On 21 November 1753, a group of fishermen found a wooden box stranded on rocks along the right bank of the Potengi River, near the present-day Rosary Stone (Pedra do Rosário). Inside was a statue of Our Lady of the Rosary and a message stating that no misfortune would befall the place where the image rested. The fishermen informed the local parish priest, Manoel Correia Gomes, who confirmed that the statue was indeed of Our Lady of the Rosary. The image was proclaimed patroness of Natal and renamed Our Lady of the Presentation, since 21 November is the date when the Catholic Church celebrates the Presentation of Mary at the Temple in Jerusalem. In the second half of the 18th century, construction began on the Church of Saint Anthony, the third Catholic temple in Natal, later nicknamed the "Church of the Rooster."

In 1817, during the Pernambucan Insurrection, the Rio Grande do Norte region joined the movement under the leadership of André de Albuquerque Maranhão, a wealthy sugar mill owner. On 29 March, he seized power in the city and formed a provisional government, but it lacked popular support. After the revolutionaries defeat in Pernambuco, the movement lost momentum, and André was overthrown and wounded on 25 April, imprisoned in the Fortress of the Three Wise Men, and died the next day.

On 7 September 1822, Brazil's independence from Portugal was proclaimed in São Paulo, but due to the distance, the news took time to reach Rio Grande do Norte. The province, now part of the Empire of Brazil, celebrated independence in Natal on 22 January 1823, when the city had about 700 inhabitants.

In 1856, Natal inaugurated its first cemetery, the Alecrim Cemetery. In 1862, the construction of the tower of the Parish Church of Our Lady of the Presentation was completed. On 4 August 1878, the telegraph service was inaugurated. On 28 September 1881, the Ribeira Railway Station was opened — the oldest train station in Rio Grande do Norte, currently operated by the Brazilian Urban Train Company.

In 1888, the Natal City Council renamed Matriz Square as André de Albuquerque Square, which marks the city's zero milestone, surrounded by important historical buildings. Finally, on 15 November 1889, with the fall of the monarchy and the Proclamation of the Republic, Rio Grande do Norte became a state, with Natal remaining its capital.

The second half of the 19th century was marked by the city's growth, driven by the cotton cycle, along the banks of the Potengi River, where the Port of Natal stands today.

=== Early decades of the 20th century ===
The first decades of the 20th century were marked by intense modernization in the city. In 1901, the neighborhood Cidade Nova was created — corresponding today to the districts of Tirol and Petrópolis. On 24 March 1904, the Carlos Gomes Theater (Alberto Maranhão Theatre since 1957) was inaugurated. In the same year, acetylene gas lighting arrived in what is now Cidade Alta. Also in 1904, about 15,000 people from the countryside, suffering from a severe drought that had persisted since 1902, migrated to the city in search of better living conditions. Four years later, the first animal-drawn trams began operating, running from Silva Jardim Street to Priest João Maria Square.

On 29 December 1909, Pope Pius X, through the papal bull Apostolicam in Singulis, created the Diocese of Natal, separated from the Diocese of Paraíba, and the Parish Church of Our Lady of the Presentation became the cathedral of the new diocese, whose territory covered the entire state of Rio Grande do Norte. The first bishop, Joaquim Antônio de Almeida, was appointed the following year and officially took office on 15 June 1911. Also in 1911, several significant events occurred: the creation of the Alecrim neighborhood, the installation of the first telephone line, the introduction of electric trams, and the arrival of cinema. The city's first power plant was also built, replacing gas lighting.

Independence Monument in September 7 Square. Created by Pernambuco-born sculptor Bibiano Silva, the monument was unveiled in 1922 during the celebrations marking the centenary of independence of Brazil, while the square itself had been established eight years earlier. In the background is Potengi Palace, built in 1873 and the seat of the state government from 1902 to 1995, which has housed the Rio Grande do Norte State Art Gallery since 1997.

In 1912, construction began on a metal bridge designed by French engineer Georges Camille Imbaul, the English Bridge (Ponte dos Ingleses), spanning 550 meters, with steel imported from England. It was inaugurated on 20 April 1916, boosting Natal's commerce and improving access between the capital and the countryside, which had previously been possible only by crossing the Potengi River by boat. According to the 1920 census, Natal's population reached 30,696 inhabitants, almost double the 16,596 recorded in 1900.

On September 7, 1922, as Brazil celebrated the centenary of its independence, the Independence Monument in September 7 Square (whose construction began in 1914) and Felipe Camarão Palace were inaugurated as the seat of the municipal administration (then called the intendency). The building only received its current name on 20 May 1955, in honor of Antônio Felipe Camarão, an Indigenous leader who fought against Dutch domination in Brazil. The palace housed the city hall until 1966, later restored and reopened in 1979.

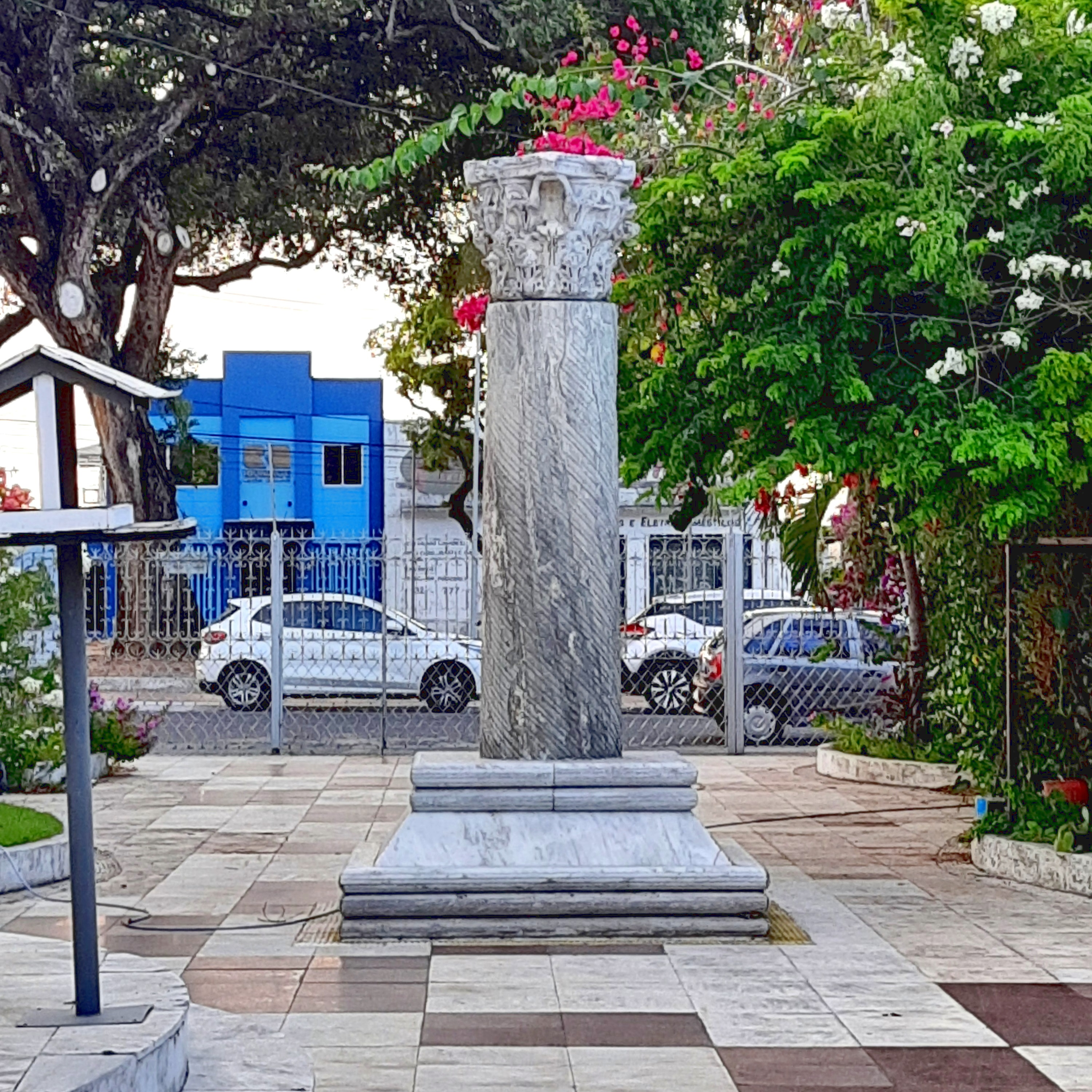
The Capitoline Column, from Rome, was donated to the city by Benito Mussolini

From 1927 onward, Natal began to gain importance in the history of aviation, as seaplanes started landing on the waters of the Potengi River. On 19 March 1928, Januário Cicco founded the Natal Maternity Hospital, later renamed in his honor on 12 February 1950. In 1929, the office of intendente (municipal administrator) was officially transformed into mayor, and Omar O'Grady, who had served since November 1924, became Natal's first mayor, remaining in office until 8 October 1930, when all mayors in Rio Grande do Norte were removed during a revolutionary movement.

On New Year's Day of 1931, the Italian ship Lazzaro Malocello, commanded by Commander Carlo Alberto Coraggio, arrived in Natal carrying the Capitoline Column, a piece of Ancient Rome, donated by Benito Mussolini to commemorate the first flight from Natal to Rome, completed in 1928. On 6 January 1931, the city was visited by the Italian Air Force, and two days later, the Capitoline Column was formally inaugurated. On 21 October 1932, a presidential decree created the Port of Natal, which began operations three days later.

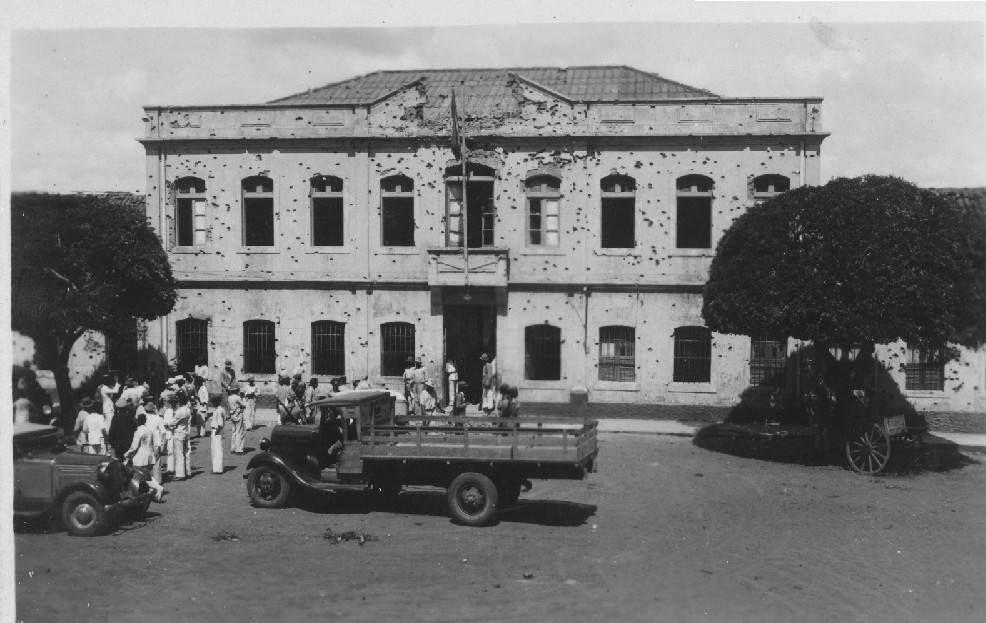
The Salgadeira Barracks, current headquarters of the Student House, after the Communist Uprising of 1935

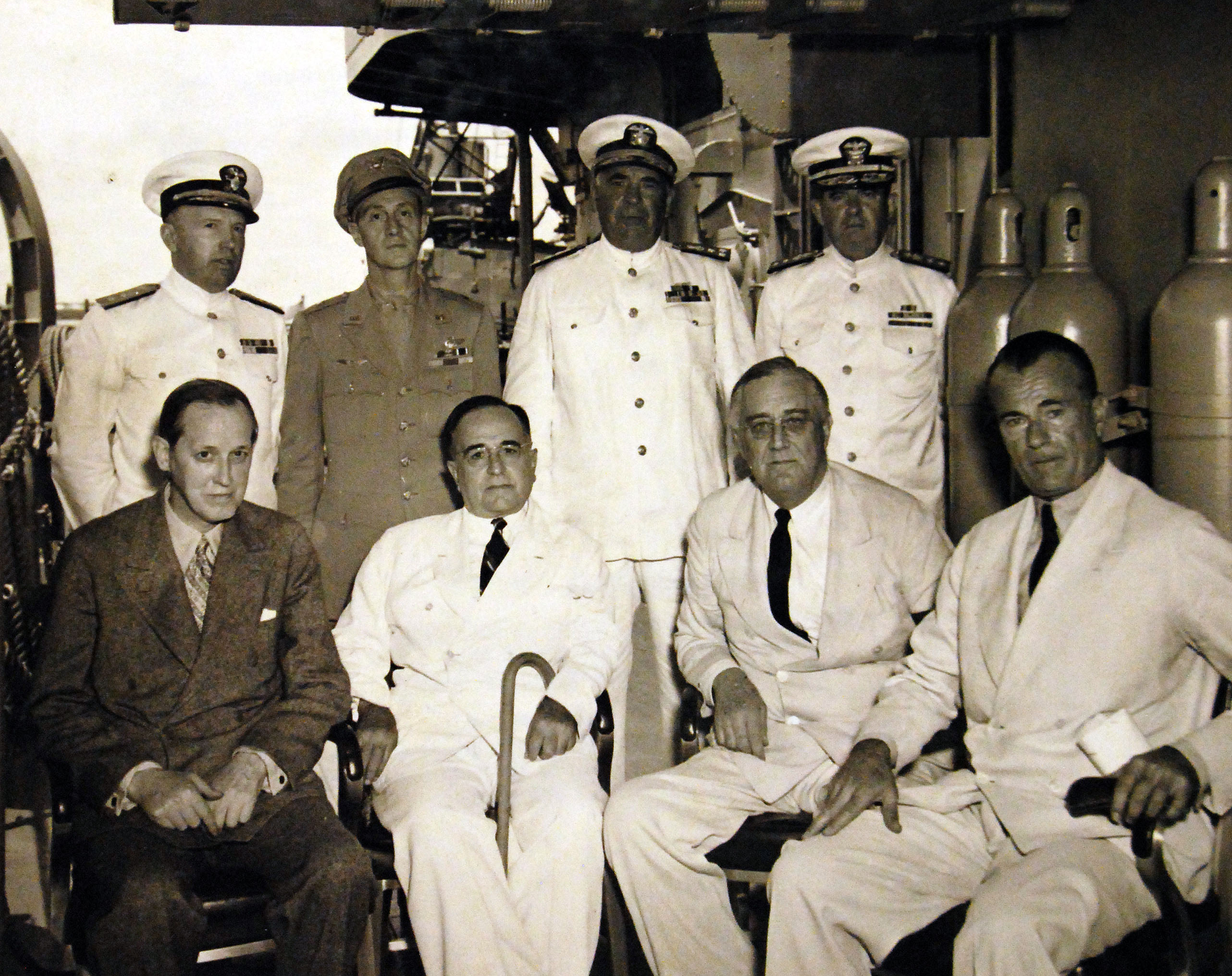
The presidents of Brazil, Getúlio Vargas, and the United States, Franklin Delano Roosevelt, during the Potengi Conference, held aboard the USS Humboldt on 28 January 1943, with Harry Hopkins, Roosevelt's advisor (left) and Jefferson Caffery, US ambassador to Brazil (right)

On the night of 23 November 1935, during a graduation ceremony at the Carlos Gomes Theater, the Communist Uprising (Intentona Comunista) erupted, targeting first the 21st Infantry Battalion Barracks, now the Winston Churchill State School. Two days later, rebels seized control of the city, forming a revolutionary popular committee. Several people were killed, and banks, warehouses, and shops were looted. The uprising spread to Recife the next day and to Rio de Janeiro by 27 November, but it quickly lost strength as troops from Ceará and Paraíba arrived to suppress it. The rebels abandoned the city and were eventually defeated in the Doctor's Mountain (Serra do Doutor) region, in Campo Redondo, as they attempted to flee toward Seridó.

=== World War II ===
On 28 January 1943, the USS Humboldt docked at the Port of Natal, carrying U.S. President Franklin Delano Roosevelt, returning from the Casablanca Conference in Morocco. On this occasion, Roosevelt met with Brazilian President Getúlio Vargas. The meeting became known as the Potengi Conference, during which both leaders discussed Brazil's entry into the war — leading to the creation of the Brazilian Expeditionary Force.

With the advent of World War II, Natal continued to grow rapidly, driven by the presence of Brazilian and Allied troops, especially Americans. Close relations developed between the locals and U.S. military personnel, with numerous social gatherings and dances, which introduced foreign musical styles and gradually transformed the city's cultural habits. Natal's population grew from 54,836 in 1940 to 103,215 in 1950, nearly doubling in just one decade.

Due to its location near the "corner of South America," the U.S. Department of War considered Natal "one of the four most strategic points in the world," alongside the Suez Canal (Egypt), the Bosporus Strait (Turkey), and the Strait of Gibraltar (between Africa and Europe).

=== From the postwar period to the 1990s ===
In 1946, during the administration of Mayor Sylvio Pedroza, the Circular Avenue — currently known as President Café Filho Avenue — was inaugurated. In 1949, construction began on the Mãe Luíza Lighthouse, formally inaugurated in 1951, standing 37 meters height. The following year, by the papal bull Arduum Onus issued by Pope Pius XII, the Diocese of Natal was elevated to the dignity of an archdiocese, and Bishop Marcolino Esmeraldo, who had served since 1929, became its first archbishop, remaining in office until his death in 1967.

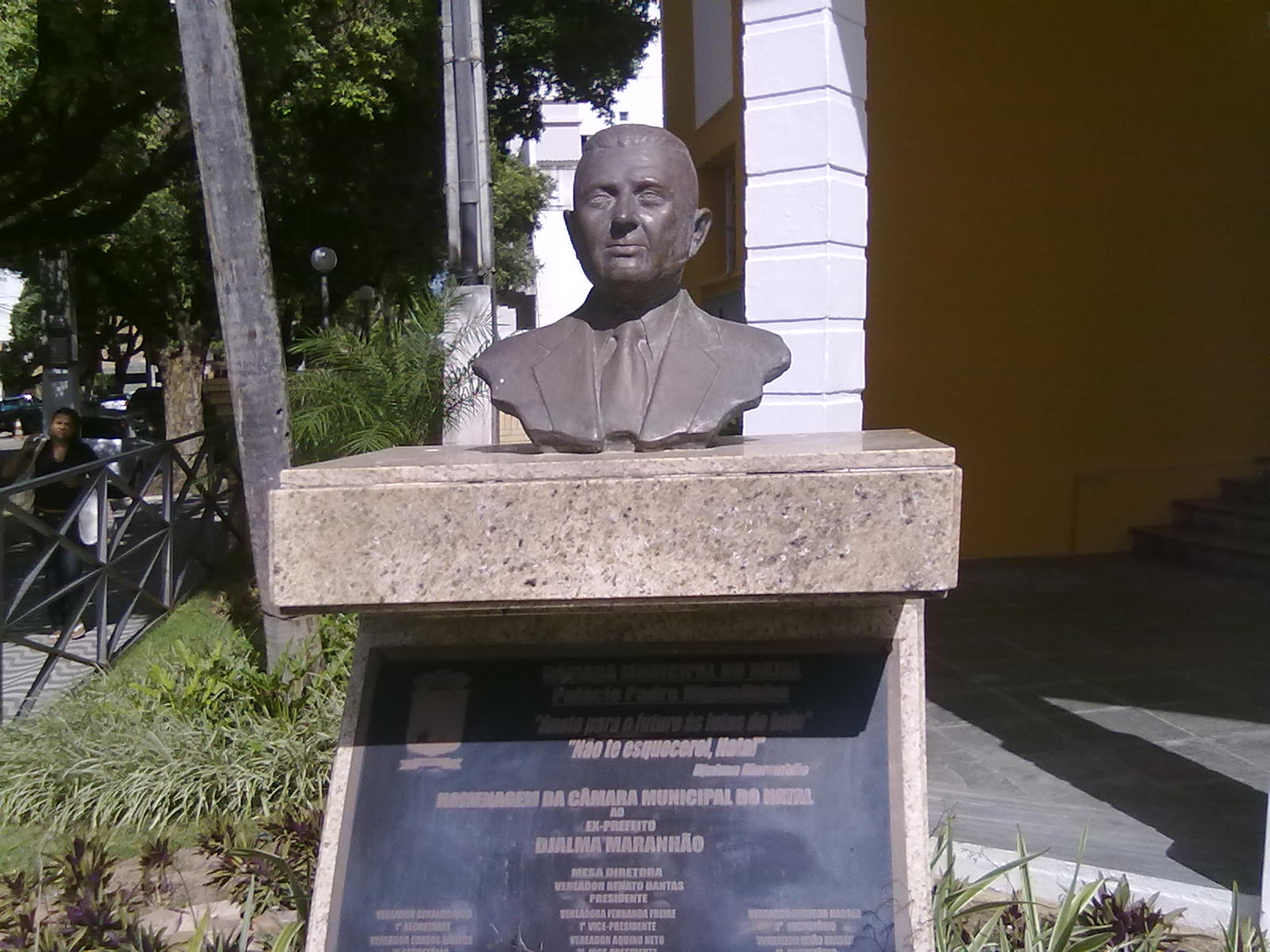
Bust of Djalma Maranhão, the first elected mayor in Natal's history, at the entrance to the City Council building

In 1956, Djalma Maranhão, also from Natal, was appointed mayor by Governor Dinarte Mariz, and in 1960 he won the first direct mayoral election in the city's history. Among his achievements was the "Barefoot Campaign Also Learn to Read" (Campanha de Pé no Chão Também se Aprende a Ler), which brought significant advances to local education. In 1964, with the establishment of the military regime in Brazil, Djalma Maranhão had his mandate revoked and was imprisoned in army barracks in the city, later being transferred to Recife and then to Fernando de Noronha. After being released by a habeas corpus from the Supreme Federal Court (STF) in December 1964, he went into exile in Montevideo, Uruguay, where he lived until 1971, the year of his death.

On 7 September 1965, the International Hotel of the Three Kings (Hotel Internacional dos Reis Magos) was inaugurated on Meio Beach, operating for thirty years until 1995, and remaining abandoned until its demolition in January 2020. On 12 October of the same year, the Ministry of Aeronautics officially created the first rocket launch base in South America — the Barreira do Inferno Launch Center — located in the municipality of Parnamirim, earning Natal the nickname "Brazil's Space Capital." In 1967, the city's first master plan was drafted, and five years later the Humberto de Alencar Castelo Branco Stadium (Castelão) was inaugurated, later renamed João Cláudio de Vasconcelos Machado Stadium (Machadão) in 1989. In May 1969, Mayor Agnelo Alves, who had governed Natal since 1966, was stripped of his political rights and imprisoned by the military regime. From that date onward, the city's mayors were appointed by the governor of Rio Grande do Norte, under Institutional Act No. 3 of 1966, which imposed indirect elections for state governors and granted them the power to appoint the mayors of their capitals.

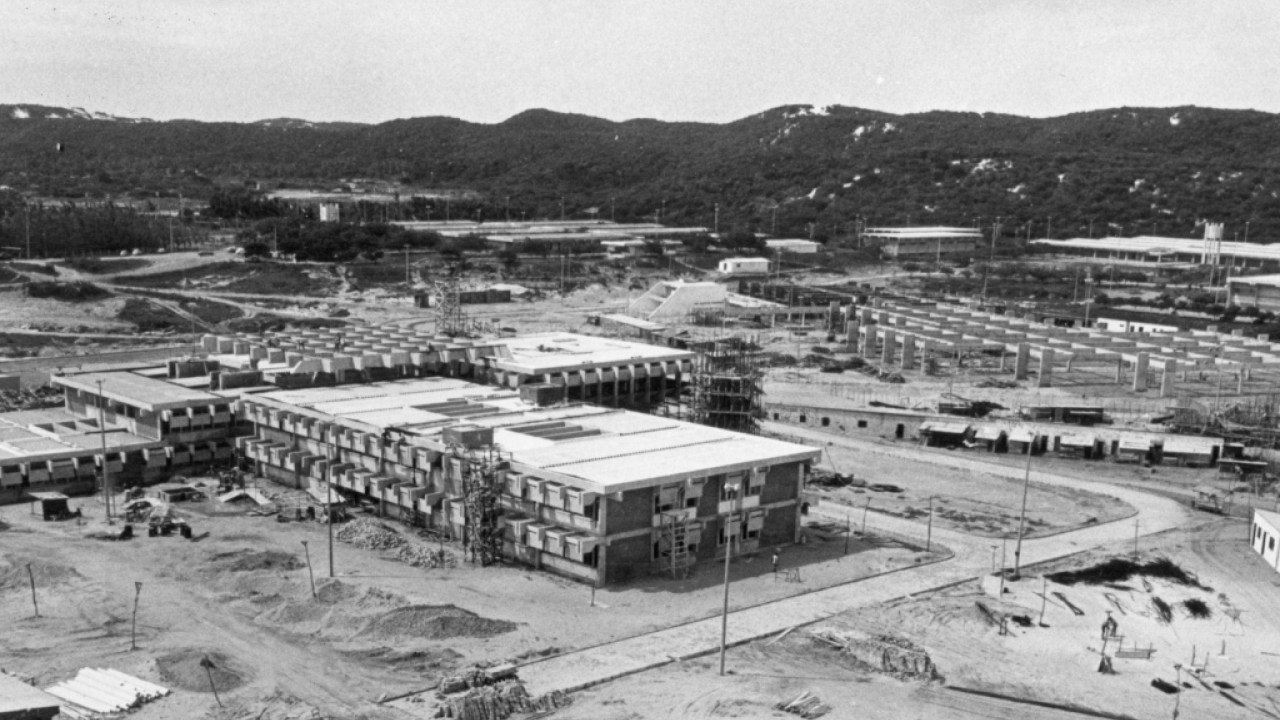
Construction of the central campus of UFRN, in the 1970s

On 26 September 1970, the concrete Igapó Bridge replaced the old "English Bridge," which was to be dismantled but never completely removed; much of its metallic structure remains preserved to this day. On 14 March 1971, the city gained the General Hospital and Emergency Room of Natal, which began operating only in 1973 under the name Monsignor Walfredo Gurgel Hospital. In 1974, the Municipal Building Code was established, construction began on the Ponta Negra Viaduct, and the colonial landmark was transferred from Touros to the Fortress of the Three Wise Men. The following year, the road to Ponta Negra was paved — later becoming Engineer Roberto Freire Avenue — and the BR-101 highway between Natal and Parnamirim was doubled. Also during the 1970s, the central campus of the Federal University of Rio Grande do Norte was built on a 123-hectare area of the current Lagoa Nova neighborhood. That decade and the following ones saw rapid population growth: between the 1960 and 1970 censuses, the population jumped from 160,253 to 264,379 inhabitants, reaching 416,898 in 1980 and 606,887 in 1991.

In 1983, Natal gained its Convention Center, and in the early morning of 25 February 1984, during Carnival, the "Baldo tragedy" occurred— nineteen people were killed and twelve injured after being run over by a bus driver seeking revenge after being told he would have to work overtime. On 6 April 1984, the city hosted the Diretas Já movement, when more than sixty thousand people gathered around Gentil Ferreira Square demanding the return of direct presidential elections in Brazil.

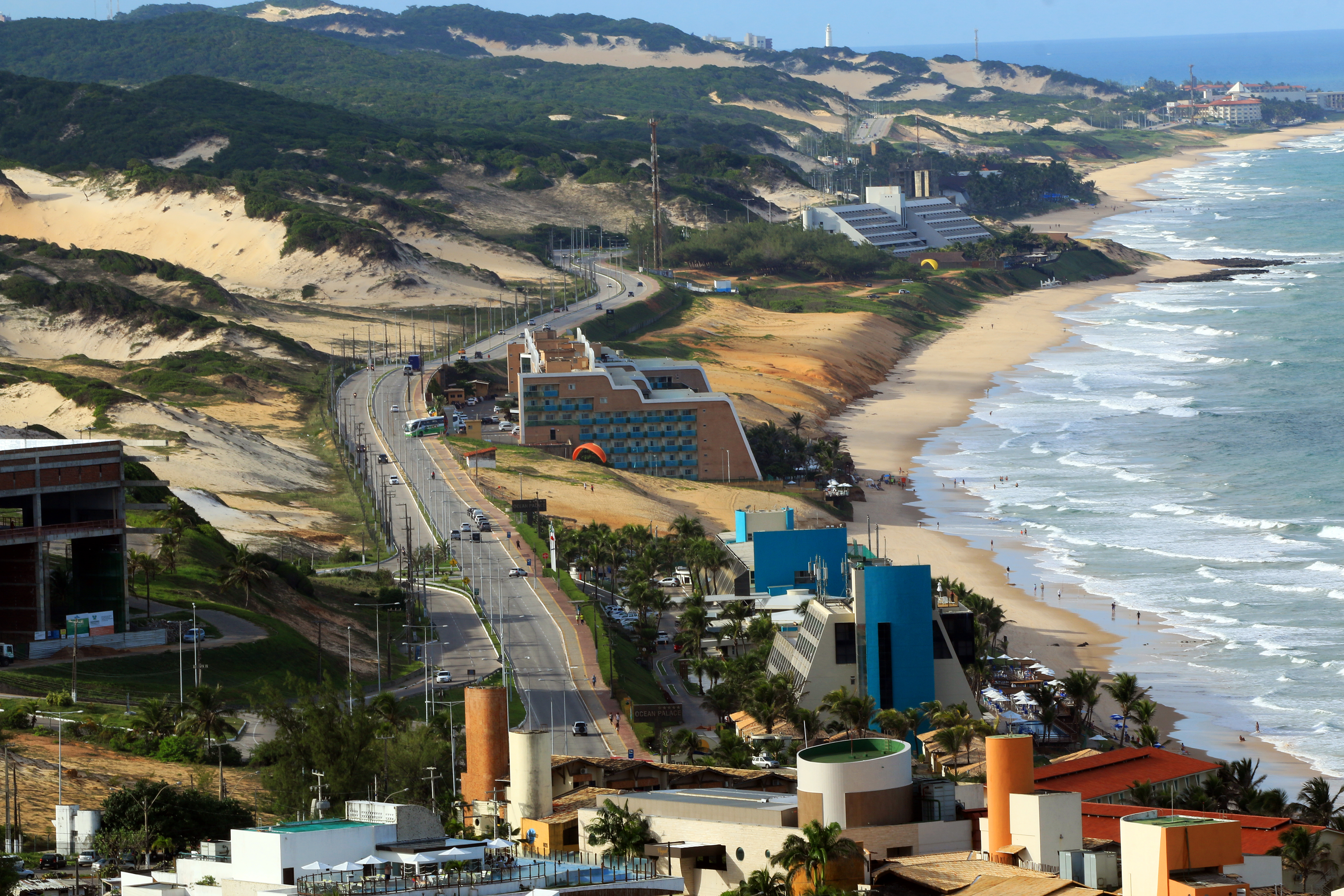
The Coastal Highway (RN-301), an expressway between the Atlantic Ocean and the Natal Dunes State Park, significantly boosted local tourism starting in the 1980s. Along its length are the city's four-star and five-star hotels.

After being initiated in the late 1970s during Governor Tarcísio Maia's administration, the Via Costeira — officially Senator Dinarte Mariz Avenue (RN-301) — was opened to the public in 1985 by Governor José Agripino, son of Tarcísio. The road, which runs between the Atlantic Ocean and the Natal Dunes State Park, significantly boosted local tourism, especially in Ponta Negra, which evolved from a small fishing village into one of the city's most upscale and valued areas.

After two decades, Natal held direct elections for mayor again in 1985, when Garibaldi Alves Filho was elected and served between 1986 and 1989. In the following election, held in 1988, Wilma de Faria became the first woman elected mayor in the city's history. Six days later, Archbishop Alair Vilar, at the beginning of his episcopate, inaugurated the new Metropolitan Cathedral, replacing the old Church of Our Lady of the Presentation, which had become too small for the growing number of faithful. The new cathedral received a visit from Pope John Paul II on 12 October 1991, during his third visit to Brazil. That same year saw the first edition of Carnatal, which would later enter the Guinness Book as the world's largest street carnival. In 1996, Wilma was elected for her second term as mayor, and on 16 January 1997, a state law created the Greater Natal, initially composed of the capital and five neighboring municipalities.

=== From the fourth centennial to the present day ===
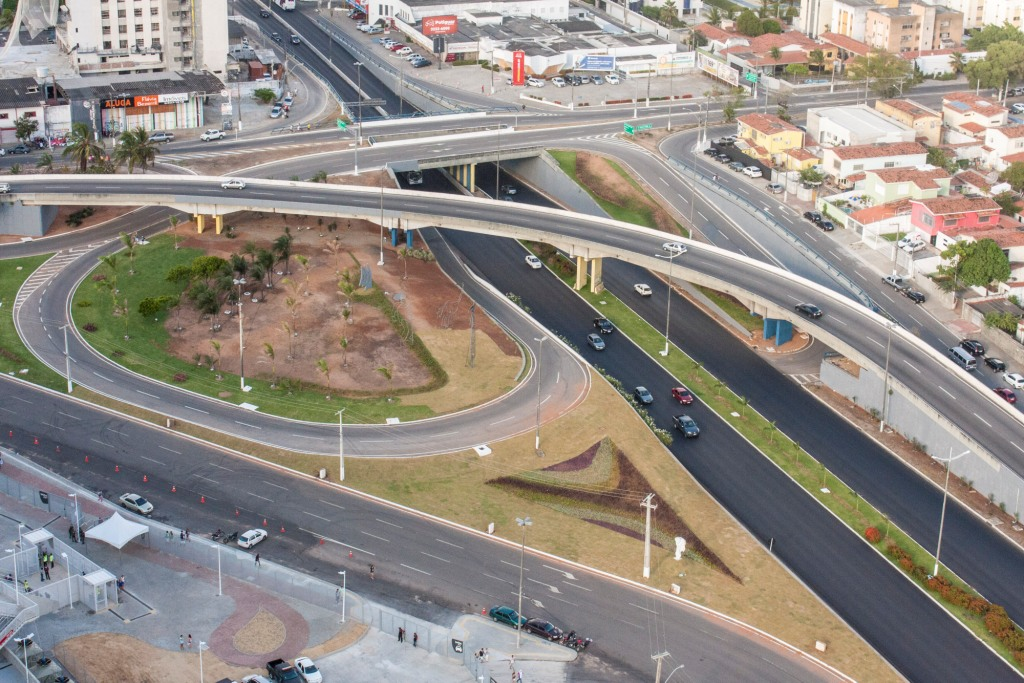
The Senator Carlos Alberto de Sousa Road Complex, in the Lagoa Nova neighborhood, was inaugurated in 2000 during the celebrations of Natal's 400th anniversary

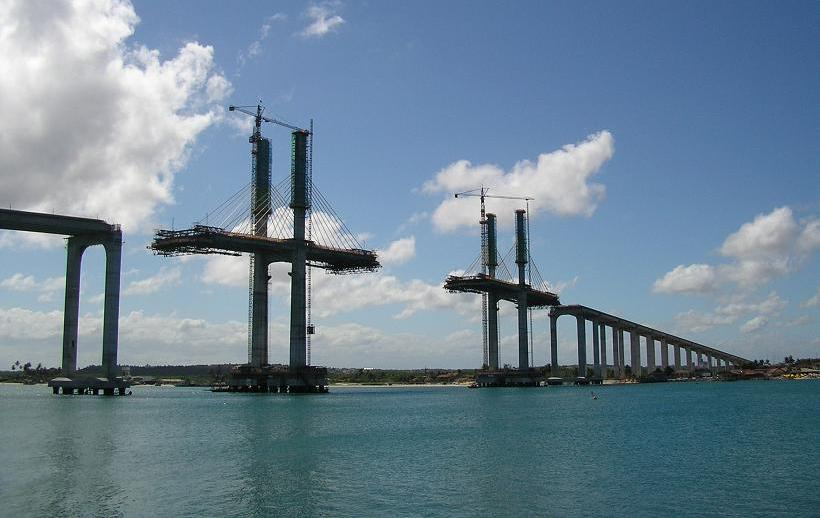
The Newton Navarro Bridge in January 2007, in the final months of its construction

In 1999, Natal celebrated its 400th anniversary. As part of the commemorations, the Portico of the Three Wise Men was inaugurated to welcome visitors arriving via the southern section of the BR-101 highway. On 25 February 2000, the Fourth Centennial Viaduct was opened, connecting the avenues Senator Salgado Filho and Prudente de Morais. That same year, Ponta Negra Beach gained a four-kilometer boardwalk with kiosks along its stretch, replacing the numerous beach huts that once stood there. Also in 2000, Wilma de Faria was re-elected for a third term, serving until April 2002, when she resigned to run for governor of Rio Grande do Norte. She won the election, becoming the state's first woman governor. Her vice, Carlos Eduardo Alves, assumed office and was re-elected in 2004. On 27 April 2005, the Midway Mall, developed by the Guararapes Group, was inaugurated, quickly becoming the largest shopping center in Rio Grande do Norte.

On 21 November 2007, three years after construction began, the Newton Navarro Bridge was officially opened to traffic. The new bridge connects the neighborhoods of Santos Reis and Redinha and was built as an alternative to the Igapó Bridge, being named after the renowned local artist Newton Navarro Bilro. On 31 May 2009, Natal was announced as one of the twelve host cities for the 2014 FIFA World Cup. Later that night (into the following morning), Air France Flight 447 enroute from Rio De Janeiro to Paris crashed into the Atlantic Ocean approximately 300km northeast of the city killing all 228 passengers and crew. In 2010, the Via Costeira was doubled, and the city's Historic Center — encompassing parts of the Cidade Alta and Ribeira — was listed as a cultural heritage site by Brazil’s National Institute of Historic and Artistic Heritage.

On 27 August 2012, the city witnessed the Bus Revolt after the municipal government announced a 20-cent fare increase, which was revoked on 6 September following strong protests. In the municipal elections held on 28 October of the same year, former mayor Carlos Eduardo was elected for a third term, while then-mayor Micarla de Sousa was removed from office three days later amid allegations of corruption in the Municipal Health Department. Before Carlos Eduardo's inauguration on 1 January 2013, the city went through two interim mayors in less than two months.

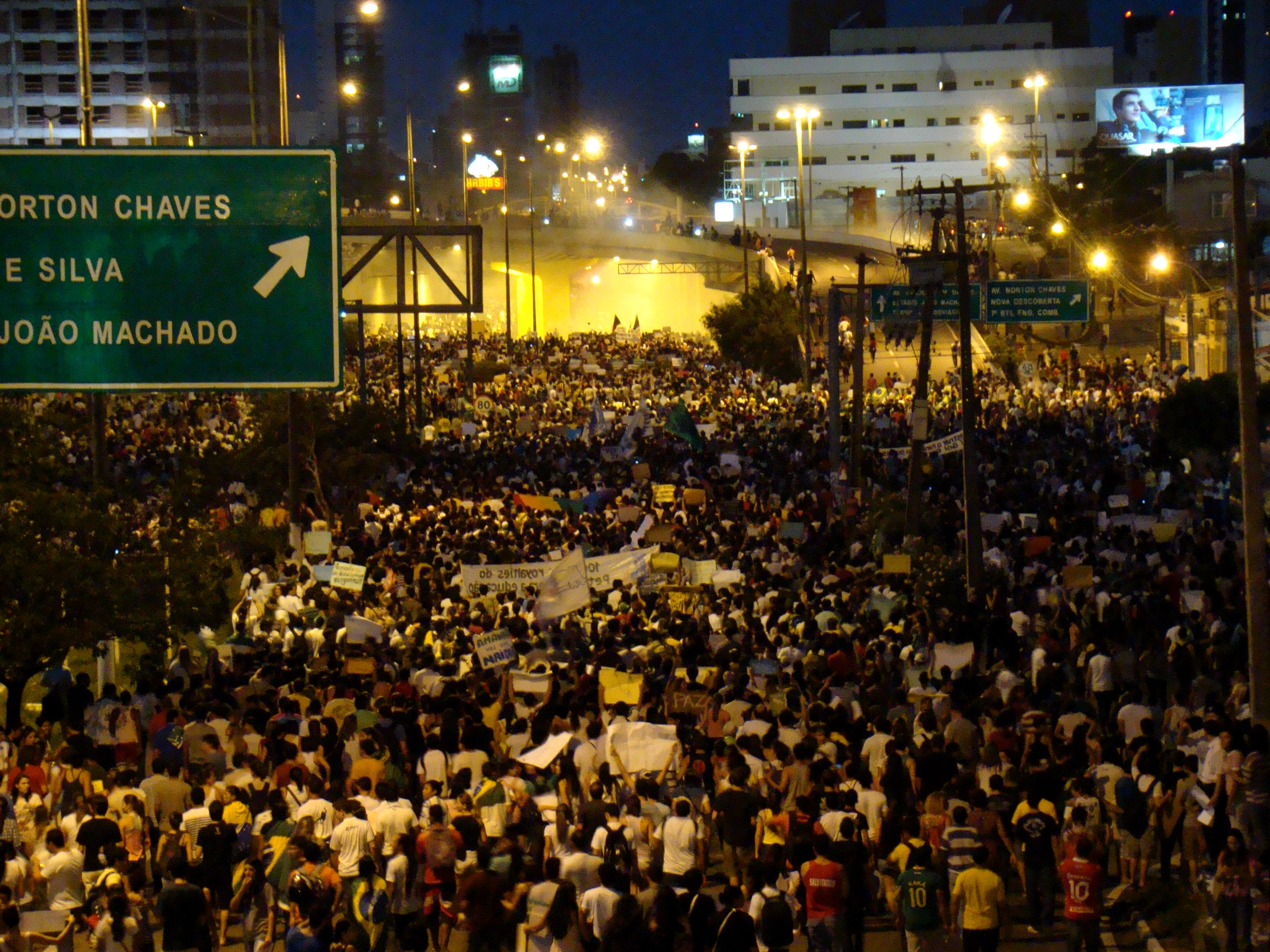
Protests in Natal on 20 June 2013, during the June Journeys

Mãe Luíza Staircase, officially named Portal do Sol Klebson do Nascimento, has been recognized as a tangible cultural heritage site of Natal since December 2021. The name honors a resident of the Mãe Luíza neighborhood who died on March 21, 2015, during heavy rainfall, after being swept into a temporary drainage pipe on Atalaia Street.

On 15 May 2013, two days after another bus fare increase was announced, new protests broke out, intensifying the following month. Natal thus became one of the first cities to experience the June Journeys (Jornadas de Junho), a wave of nationwide demonstrations initially sparked by fare hikes but soon expanding to broader social and anti-corruption demands.

On 22 January 2014, after nearly two and a half years of construction, the Arena das Dunas Stadium was inaugurated on the same site where the old Machadão stadium once stood. The stadium hosted four World Cup group-stage matches. During the tournament, the city declared a state of public calamity due to heavy rainfall between 13 and 16 June causing floods and landslides. In the Mãe Luíza neighborhood, a major slope collapse extended from Guanabara Street to Areia Preta Beach, destroying several homes. In that area, the city later built the Mãe Luíza Stairway, officially named Portal do Sol Klebson Nascimento, inaugurated in December of the following year.

In October 2016, Carlos Eduardo was re-elected in the first round. Taking office on 1 January 2017, he resigned on 6 April 2018, to run for governor, being succeeded by his vice, Álvaro Costa Dias. In that election, the capital gave Carlos Eduardo an 80,000-vote lead in the first round, extended to over 90,000 in the second; nevertheless, he was defeated statewide by Fátima Bezerra. In 2020, Álvaro Dias was re-elected mayor of the city. In the 2024 elections, former city councilor and federal deputy Paulinho Freire was elected mayor in the runoff with 55.34% of the valid votes.

== Geography ==
Natal is located at 5°46′S 35°12′W, in the far east of South America. The city has a total area of 170 square kilometres (66 sq mi). Natal lies on the Atlantic Ocean, at the mouth of the Potengi River.

=== Climate ===
Natal has a typical tropical climate, specifically a tropical wet and dry climate (Köppen climate classification: As), with warm to hot temperatures and high relative humidity all throughout the year. However, these conditions are relieved by a near absence of extreme temperatures and pleasant trade winds blowing from the ocean. February is the warmest month, with mean maximum of 30.7 °C or 87.3 °F and minimum of 24.6 °C or 76.3 °F, while July is the coolest with mean maximum of 28.4 °C or 83.1 °F and minimum of 21 °C or 69.8 °F. Rainfall is heavy at around 1,690 millimetres (67 in) per year, but there is a dry season between about September and January that is more distinct than further south on the Atlantic coast. The greatest amount of rain falls between March and July.

Known as the "City of the Sun" and also as "The City of the Dunes", Natal is located in the northeastern tip of Brazil. Lying about six degrees south of the equator the sun shines on for more than 3,000 hours every year. The average temperature in Natal is about 27 °C or 80.6 °F. During the summer season it normally reaches above 30 °C (86 °F) with the water at 26 °C (79 °F).

Climate data for Natal, Rio Grande do Norte (1991–2020 normals, extremes 1931–1970 and 1983–present)
Month	Jan	Feb	Mar	Apr	May	Jun	Jul	Aug	Sep	Oct	Nov	Dec	Year
Record high °C (°F)	33.4 (92.1)	36.8 (98.2)	33.8 (92.8)	33.0 (91.4)	32.4 (90.3)	32.3 (90.1)	30.8 (87.4)	31.2 (88.2)	31.8 (89.2)	32.9 (91.2)	32.7 (90.9)	32.4 (90.3)	36.8 (98.2)
Mean daily maximum °C (°F)	30.4 (86.7)	30.7 (87.3)	30.7 (87.3)	30.3 (86.5)	29.8 (85.6)	28.8 (83.8)	28.4 (83.1)	28.6 (83.5)	29.0 (84.2)	29.7 (85.5)	30.0 (86.0)	30.4 (86.7)	29.7 (85.5)
Daily mean °C (°F)	27.4 (81.3)	27.6 (81.7)	27.5 (81.5)	27.2 (81.0)	26.6 (79.9)	25.4 (77.7)	24.8 (76.6)	25.0 (77.0)	25.8 (78.4)	26.5 (79.7)	27.0 (80.6)	27.4 (81.3)	26.5 (79.7)
Mean daily minimum °C (°F)	24.4 (75.9)	24.6 (76.3)	24.2 (75.6)	23.7 (74.7)	23.1 (73.6)	21.9 (71.4)	21.0 (69.8)	21.2 (70.2)	22.2 (72.0)	23.5 (74.3)	24.2 (75.6)	24.7 (76.5)	23.2 (73.8)
Record low °C (°F)	18.4 (65.1)	19.0 (66.2)	17.9 (64.2)	17.7 (63.9)	17.9 (64.2)	14.8 (58.6)	16.1 (61.0)	15.4 (59.7)	16.6 (61.9)	17.3 (63.1)	17.9 (64.2)	18.4 (65.1)	14.8 (58.6)
Average rainfall mm (inches)	80.7 (3.18)	99.8 (3.93)	200.8 (7.91)	240.5 (9.47)	221.8 (8.73)	348.8 (13.73)	254.0 (10.00)	118.7 (4.67)	54.0 (2.13)	20.6 (0.81)	22.5 (0.89)	29.0 (1.14)	1,691.2 (66.58)
Average rainy days (≥ 1 mm)	7	8	13	16	15	18	16	12	8	5	4	5	127
Average relative humidity (%)	79.1	79.2	80.6	82.4	82.8	84.5	82.9	80.7	79.6	77.8	77.8	78.3	80.5
Mean monthly sunshine hours	256.2	228.4	241.0	218.0	232.6	199.3	215.6	253.9	267.2	295.2	285.9	286.5	2,979.8
Source: Instituto Nacional de Meteorologia

== Demographics ==
Population growth in Natal

Year	Pop.	±%
1872	20,392	—
1890	13,725	−32.7%
1900	16,056	+17.0%
1920	30,696	+91.2%
1940	54,836	+78.6%
1950	102,215	+86.4%
1960	160,253	+56.8%

Year	Pop.	±%
1970	264,379	+65.0%
1980	416,898	+57.7%
1991	606,541	+45.5%
2000	709,536	+17.0%
1991	803,739	+13.3%
2022	751,300	−6.5%

According to the IBGE of 2022, there were 751,300 people residing in the city, and 1.8952 million people residing in the Greater Natal (metropolitan area). This is the second smallest capital the country in territorial extension, therefore, the population density is high, 4.488 inhabitants per square kilometre (11.62/sq mi). It is the 21st-largest city in the country and the sixth largest in the northeastern region. The racial makeup of the city in 2022 was 46.6% Pardo (Multiracial), 43.2% White, 9.8% Black, 0.2% Asian and 0.2% Amerindian.

== Economy ==
With its dozens of sandy, white beaches, such as Ponta Negra and its famous Morro do Careca – the cliff of dolphins, Pirangi do Norte, Redinha, Pipa and Genipabu with its fixed sand dunes and imported dromedaries, tourism is the most important industry of Natal, attracting Brazilians, Europeans (many from Spain, England, Scandinavia, Germany, Portugal, Italy and France), and U.S. citizens alike. There has been an increase of 211% in foreign tourism in Natal between 2002 and 2007 (for the same time period the increase of foreign tourism in Brazil was 62,8%); This is a due to the accessibility of Natal and the appeal Brazil has for an increasing number of tourists, proving that Natal is the area leading the Brazilian tourism boom. Natal is the number one area receiving international investments in Brazil. Natal will benefit from the massive future investments on the coastline.

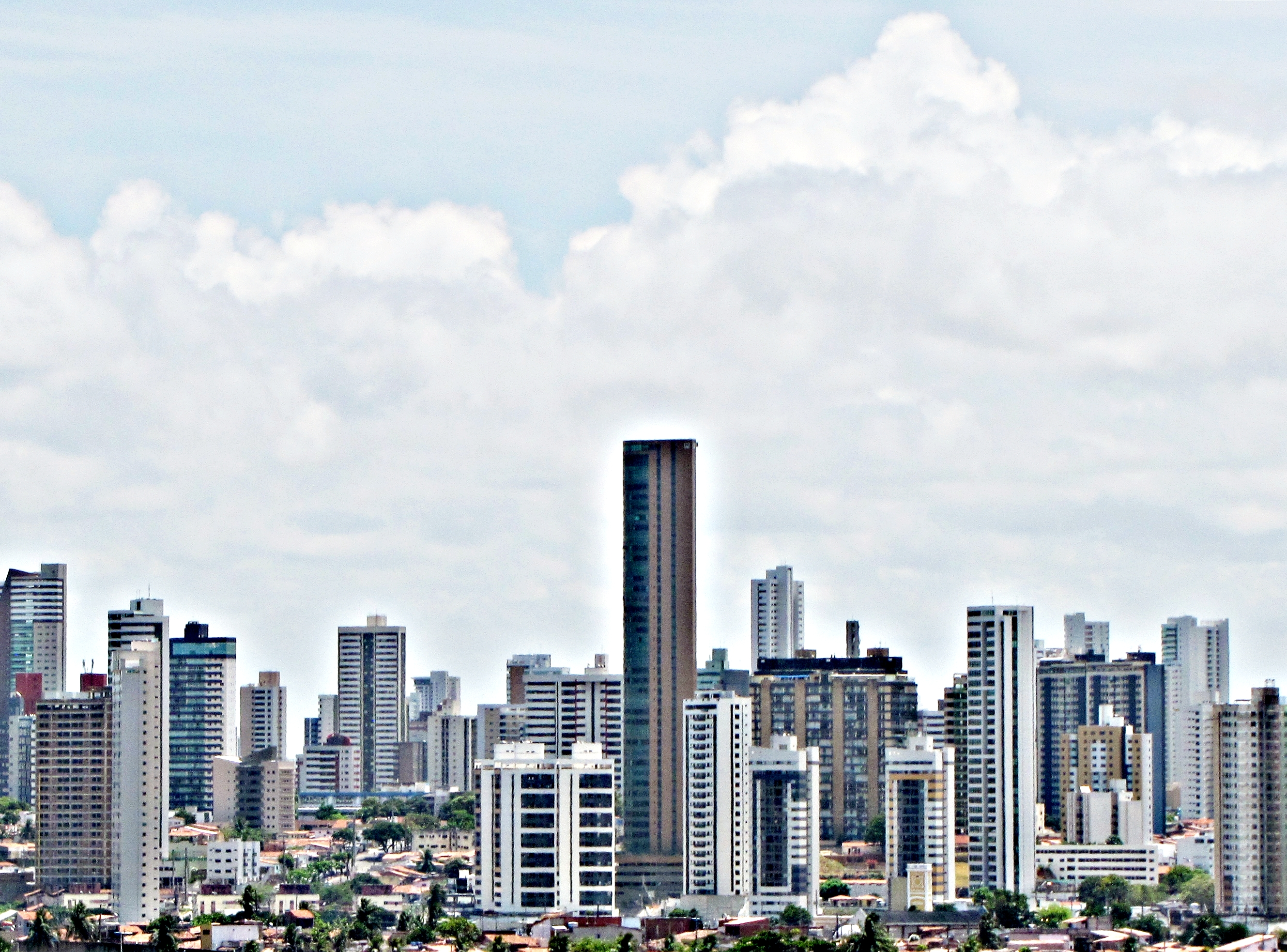
View of the city centre of Natal

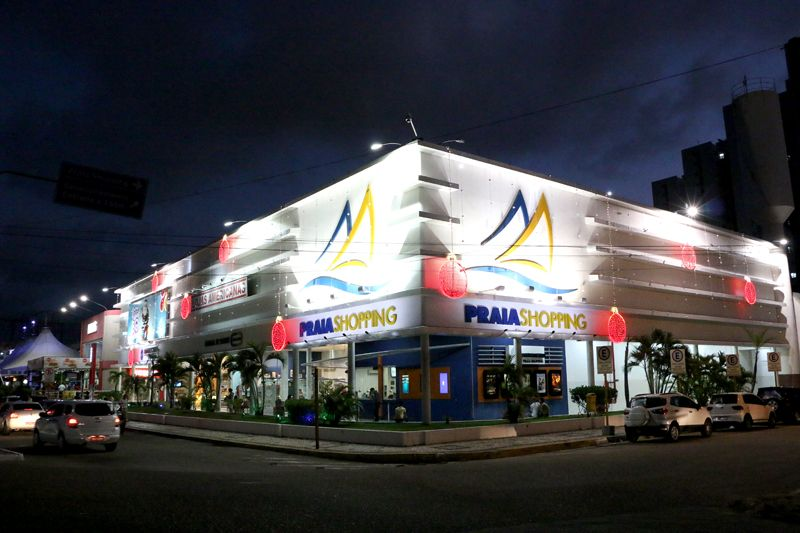
A commercial center in Natal

It is also a relevant administrative center for the oil industry (Rio Grande do Norte being the second largest oil-producing state in Brazil). Thus, its Federal University of Rio Grande do Norte (UFRN) is a national scientific research pole on Oil Sciences (ranging from Geophysical to Law studies), supported mostly by Petrobras financing.

The fishing industry is strong (shark cartilage being a major export to Japan) as is the cultivation of tropical fruit, especially mangos, guavas, and cashews (the fruit and the nuts).

In fact, the largest cashew tree in the world is located near the coast in the neighborhood of Pirangi, south of the city center. This tree has a circumference of 500 metres and occupies an area of 7,300 m^{2}, making it 70 times the size of average cashew trees.

The GDP for the city was R$206,832,516,000 (2019).

The per capita income for the city was R$26,972.28 in 2021.

== Education ==
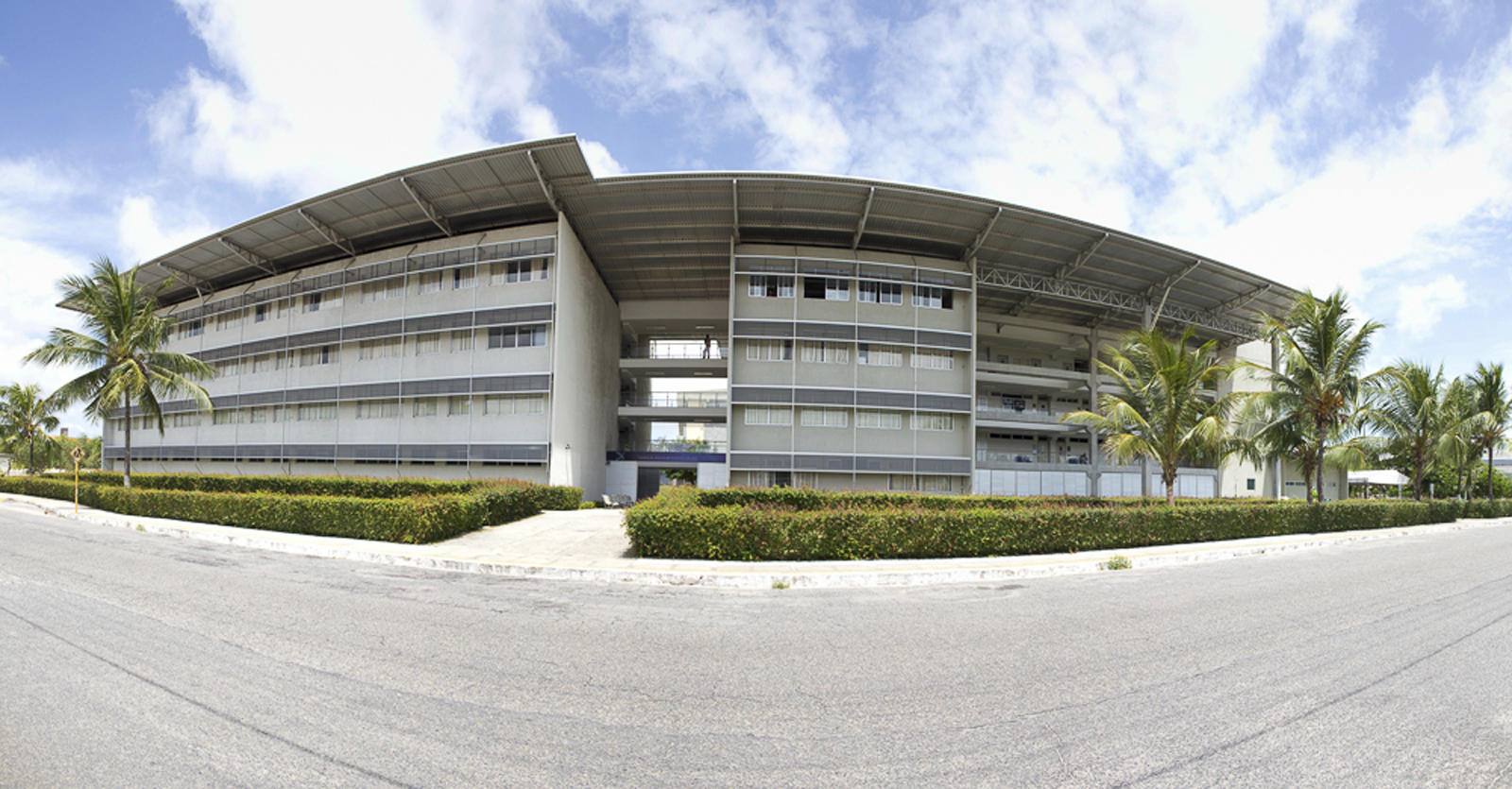
School of Science and Technology of the Federal University of Rio Grande do Norte

Portuguese language is the official national language, and thus the primary language taught in schools. But English and Spanish are part of the official high school curriculum.

=== Educational institutions ===
- Federal University of Rio Grande do Norte (UFRN)
- International Institute of Physics (IIP-UFRN)
- International Institute for Neuroscience of Natal (IINN-ELS)
- Universidade do Estado do Rio Grande do Norte (UERN)
- Universidade Potiguar (UnP)
- Instituto Federal do Rio Grande do Norte (IFRN)
- Instituto de Educação Superior Presidente Kennedy (Kennedy)
- Faculdade Natalense para o Desenvolvimento do Rio Grande do Norte (Farn)
- Faculdade de Natal (FAL)
- Faculdade de Excelência Educacional do Rio Grande do Norte (FATERN) (IINN-ELS)
- Faculdade Câmara Cascudo (FCC)
- Faculdade de Ciências Cultura e Extensão (FACEX)
- Faculdade Católica Nossa Senhora das Neves (FCNSN)
- Faculdade Maurício de Nassau (UNINASSAU)

There are more than 14 universities in the state of Rio Grande do Norte.

== Main sights ==
Natal Dunes State Park

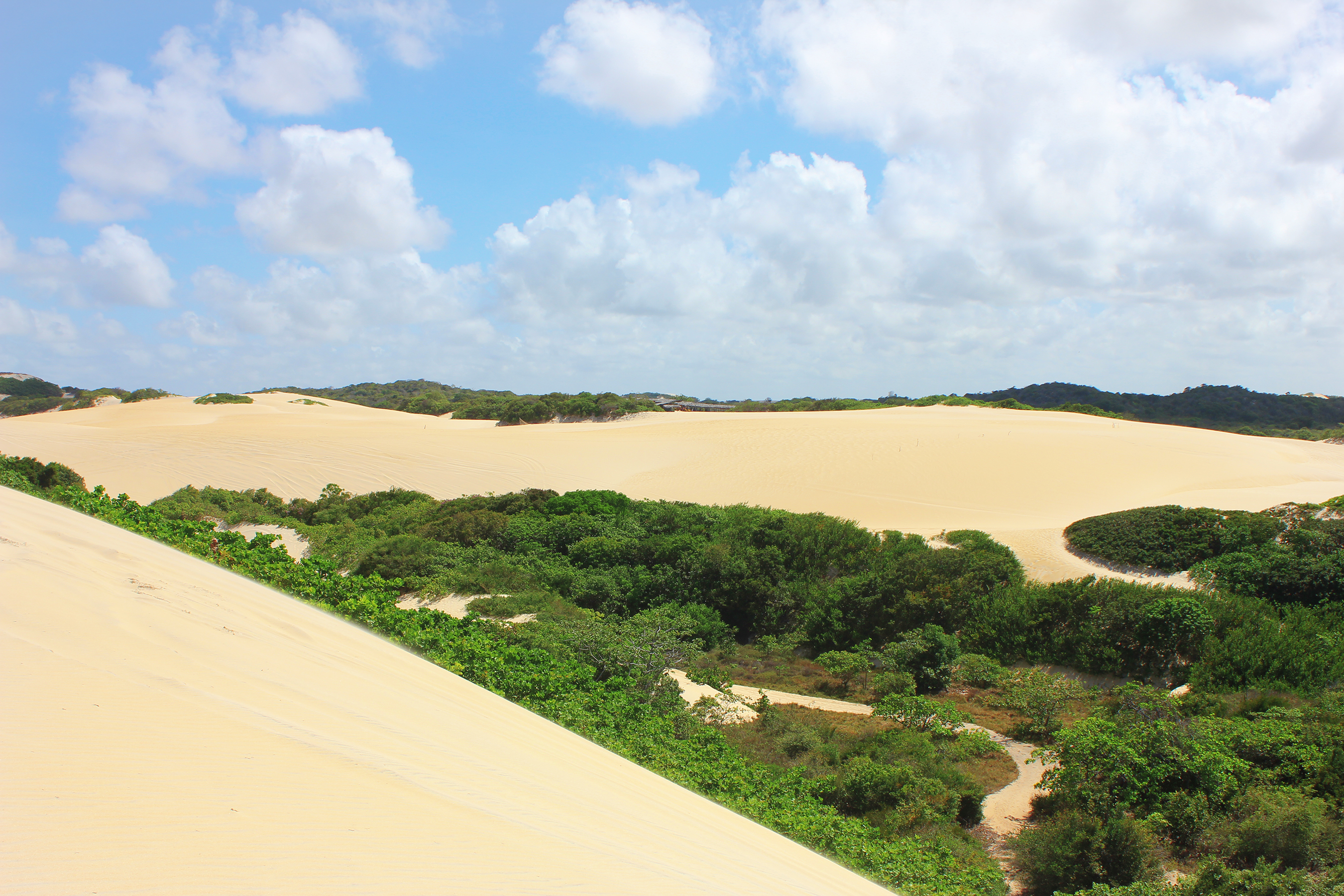
Natal Dunes State Park is the second largest urban park in Brazil.

The Natal Dunes State Park is considered the second largest urban park in Brazil. It includes 1,172 hectares of land, and allows observation of several vegetal and animal species, which are typical of the Atlantic Forest. The tour is along a trail, accompanied by trained guides. The park also has a jogging track, and stays open for visitors from Tuesday to Sunday.

Museums

Museums in Natal include: Museu de Arte Sacra, Museu de Cultura Popular, Espaço Cultural Palácio Potengi, Instituto Histórico e Geográfico do Rio Grande do Norte, Pinacoteca do Rio Grande do Norte, Museum Camara Cascudo, Memorial Camara Cascudo.

Natal Aquarium

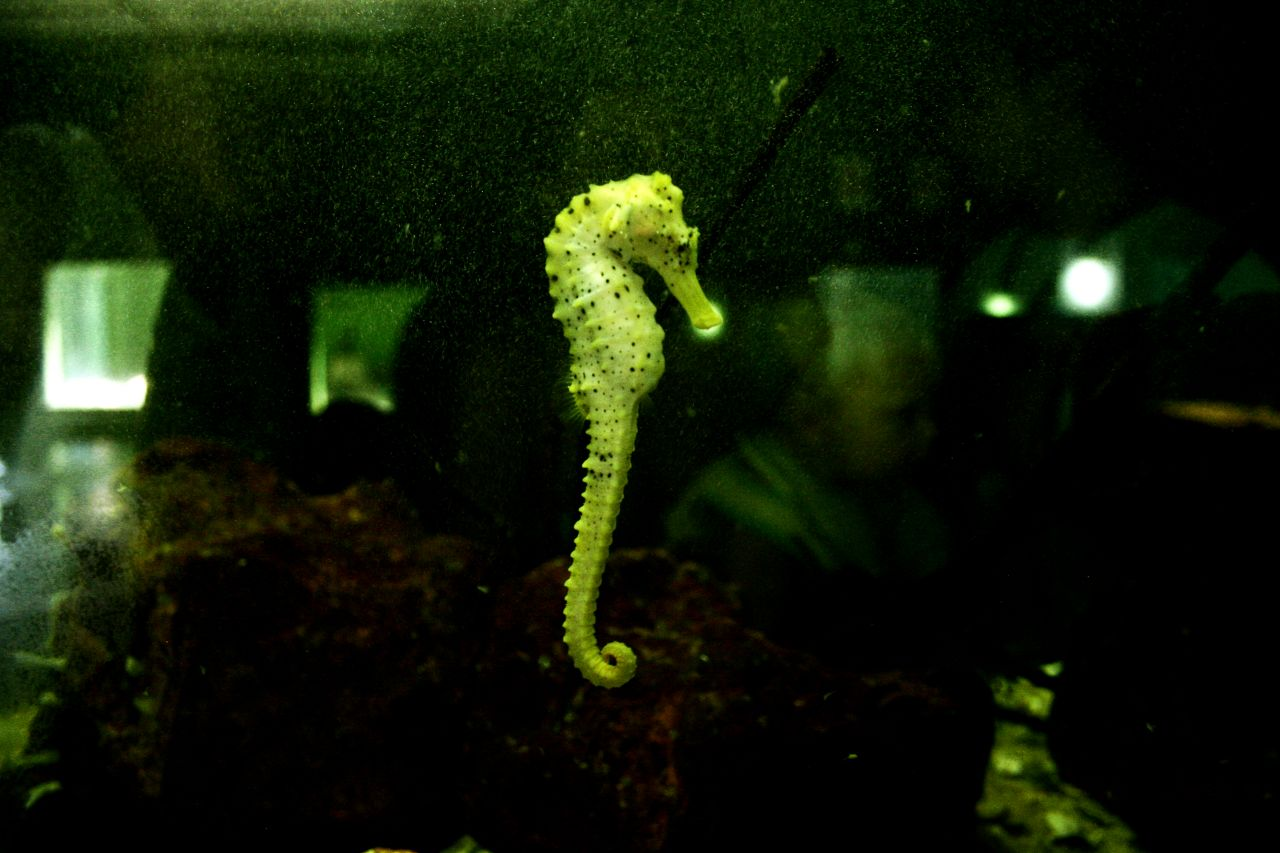
Seahorses in the Natal Aquarium

The Natal Aquarium was founded and is run by a family of biologists and retired environmentalists. Besides the exhibit, the aquarium also serves as a surgery center for sea animals. The Aquarium is located between the Oceânica Avenue and the beach. The Aquarium exhibits about 60 marine species. There are about 30 small aquariums, where the species are put individually or in small groups of two or three species. Most species were collected at the Brazilian and Rio Grande do Norte coast. Species include several kinds of fish (including piranhas), sea horses, shrimps, lobsters, stingrays, octopus, etc. In a refrigerated aquarium, there are a couple of penguins.

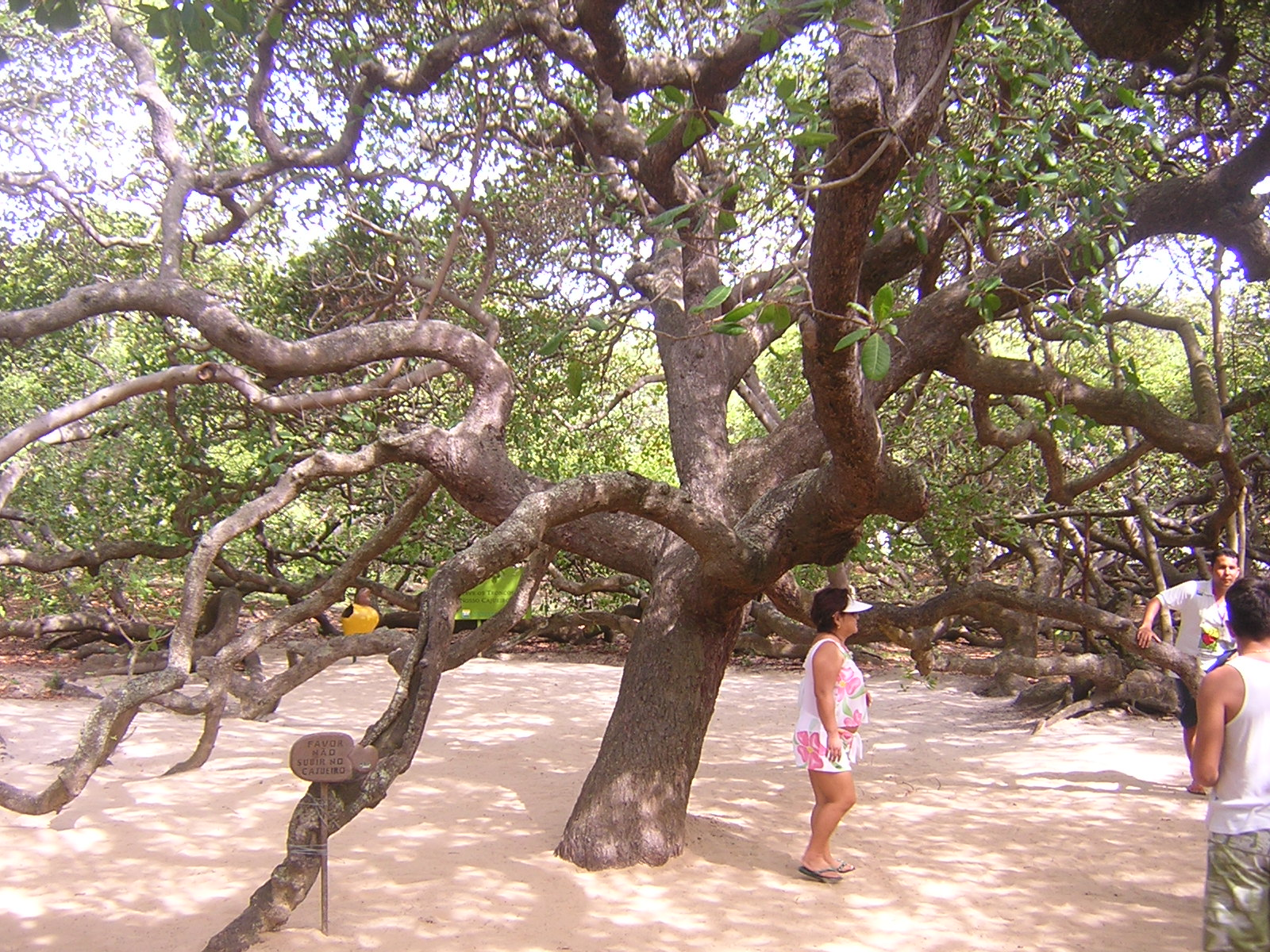
The world's largest cashew tree

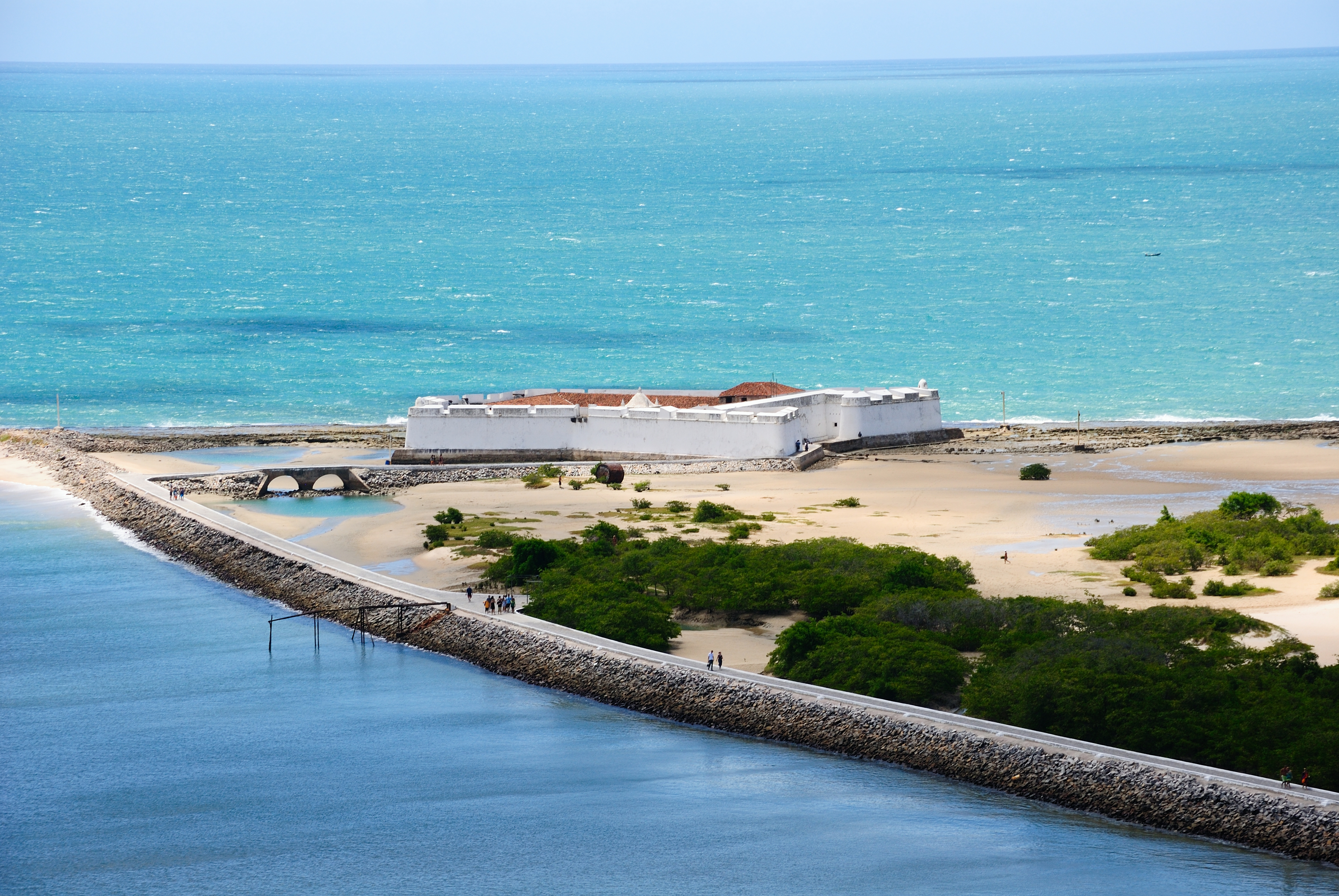
Forte dos Reis Magos, a fortress built in 1598, is now a museum.

The Largest Cashew Tree in the World

The Cashew of Pirangi is the biggest cashew tree in the world. In 1994, it entered the Guinness book as the tree which covers the largest area, 8,400 square meters; it is larger than a typical football pitch. Due to a genetic mutation, the branches of this tree grow outwards rather than upwards; thus when a branch touches the ground, roots are not created, rather a new ramification starts to grow. There is even a gazebo located in the cashew, a popular attraction among tourists.

Forte dos Reis Magos

Forte dos Reis Magos or Fortaleza dos Reis Magos is a medieval fortress that was the first milestone of the city – founded on 25 December 1599 – on the right side of the bar of the river Potenji (today near the Ponte Newton Navarro). It received its name based on the date of commencement of its construction, 6 January 1598, at Epiphany Catholic calendar.

Natal City Park

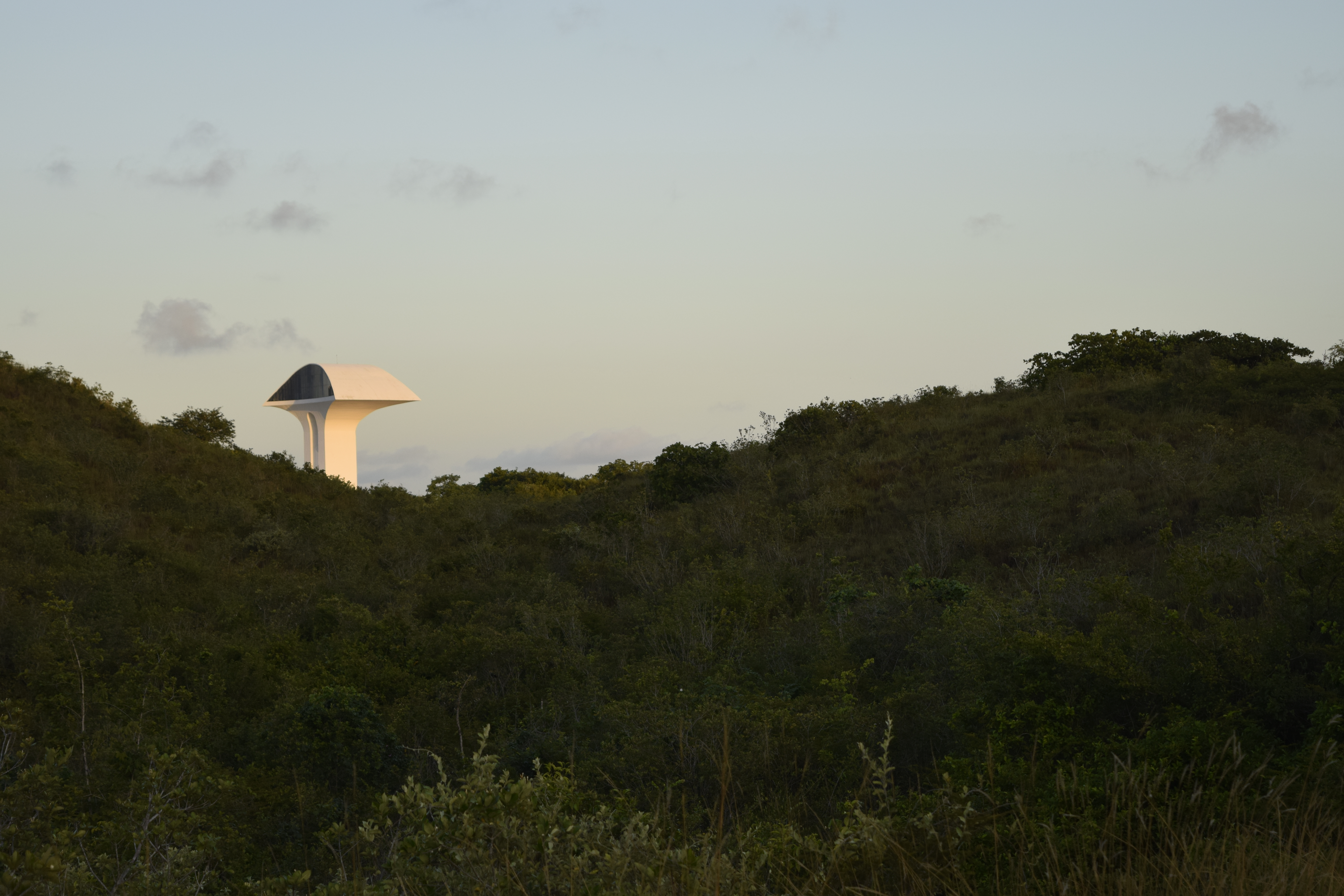
Natal City Park tower and the forest

The Natal City Park Dom Nivaldo Monte, or simply the City Park is an urban park. Inaugurated on 21 July 2008, with architectural project of Oscar Niemeyer. It has a unique, monumental tower, and has a museum and restaurant.

Festa Junina (Saint John Festival)

Festa Junina was introduced to Northeastern Brazil by the Portuguese for whom St John's day (also celebrated as Midsummer Day in several European countries), on 24 June, is one of the oldest and most popular celebrations of the year. Differently from what happens on the European Midsummer Day, the festivities in Brazil do not take place during the summer solstice but during the tropical winter solstice. The festivities traditionally begin after 12 June, on the eve of St Anthony's day, and last until the 29th, which is Saint Peter's day. During these fifteen days, there are bonfires, fireworks, and folk dancing in the streets. Typical foods and beverages are served. As during Carnival, these festivities involve wearing costumes (in this case, peasant costumes), dancing, heavy drinking, and visual spectacles (fireworks display and folk dancing). Similar to what happens on Midsummer and St John's Day in Europe, bonfires are a central part of these festivities in Brazil. Festa Junina in other cities of the state, especially in the city of Mossoró which gathers thousands of people during the month of June.

Newton Navarro bridge

Alberto Maranhão Theatre is part of the Historic Center

The Newton Navarro bridge is one of the highest bridges in Brazil and has over a gorgeous sunset seen from Potengi River. It makes the connection with the beaches of the north coast of the state. In addition to unburden the city traffic, the bridge became a tourist attraction because of its large size.

Historic Center

The Natal Historic Center it comprises an area of approximately 201,278 m^{2} (2,166,538.36 sq ft), which are included 150 buildings of various styles, including colonial architecture, neoclassical, art-deco and modernist. This area comprises the districts of Ribeira and Cidade Alta, which are the oldest neighborhoods of the city, which have characteristics of the first centuries of the history of Brazil, highlighting important aspects of Portuguese colonization.

Barreira do Inferno

The Barreira do Inferno Launch Center is the first base to launch rockets from Brazil. With the construction of another center in Brazil, today, it only launches rockets, small and medium businesses and is open to visitation of tourists to know the rockets, but must make an appointment to visit the center.

Parrachos de Maracajaú

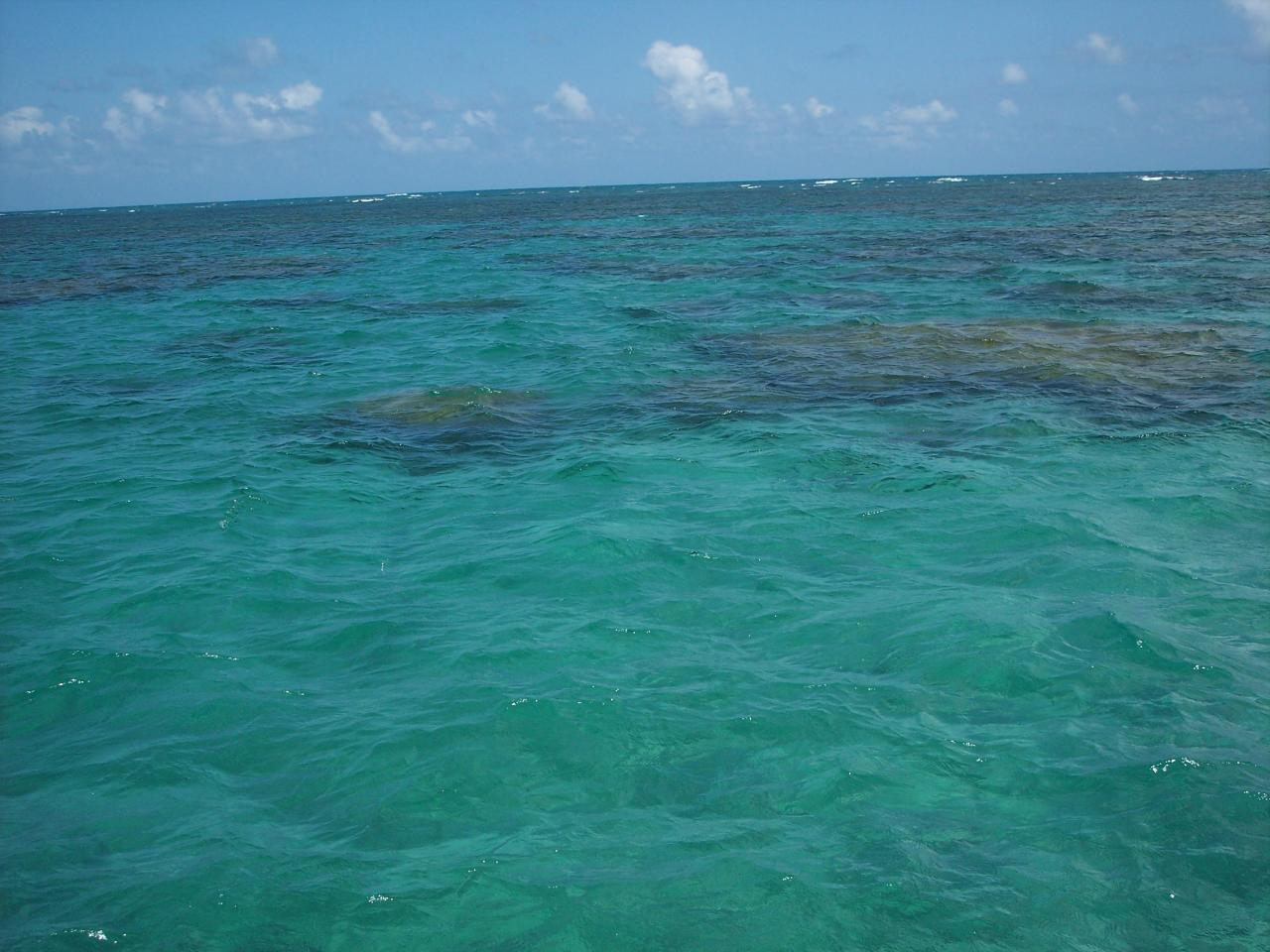
Maracajaú beach

The Parrachos de Maracajaú of coral reefs are the seven kilometers (4.3 miles) of beach in Maracajaú, forming natural pools. Occupy an area of 13 km (8 mi), excellent for snorkeling in the coral diving underwater that, at low tide, touch the surface. It is one of the places in Brazil where the sea is the most crystalline and suitable for diving. The beach of Maracajaú is 60 km (37 mi) from Natal. In Maracajaú also a water park, the Ma-Noa Park.

Genipabu

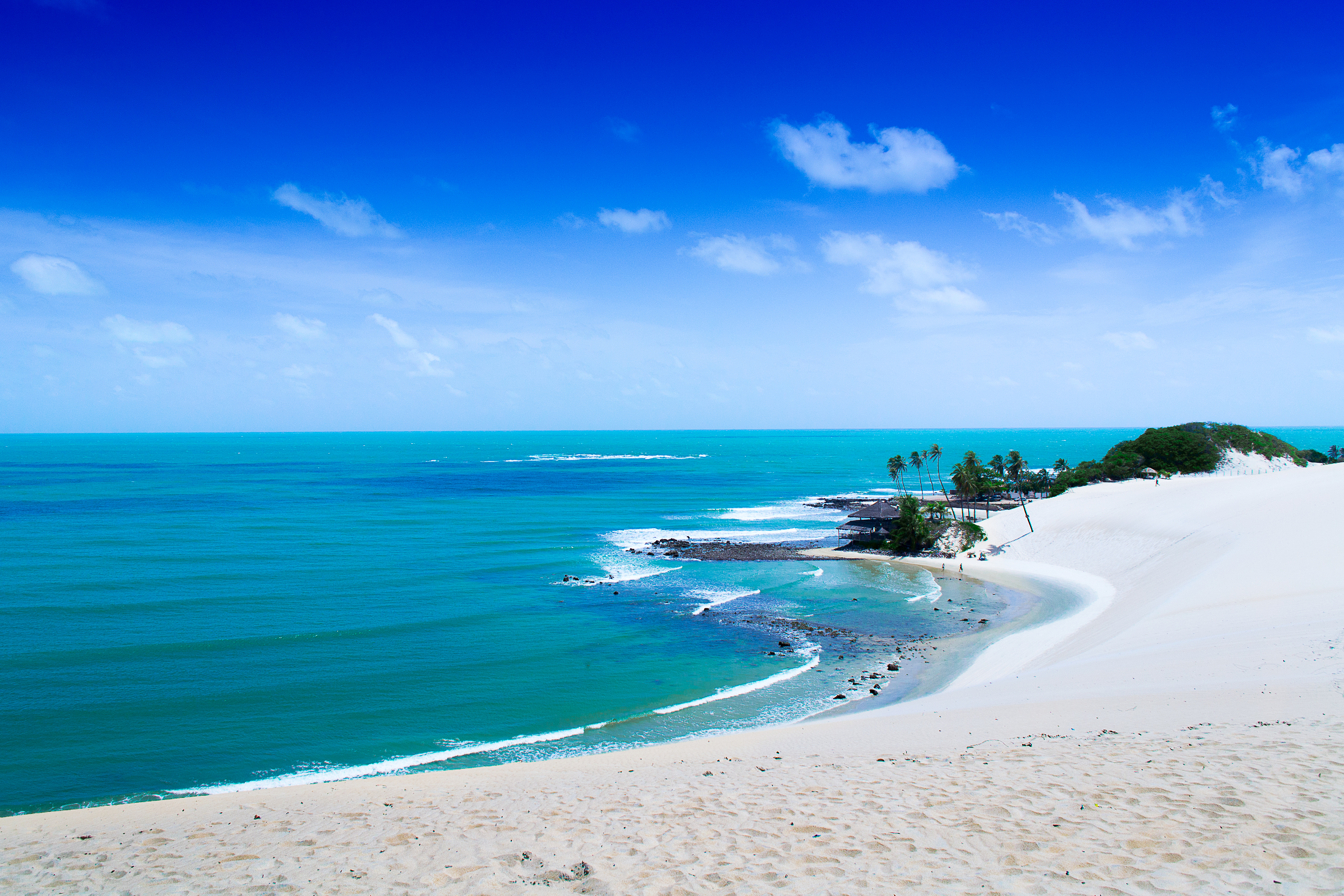
Genipabu dunes

Genipabu (or Jenipabu) is a beach, a complex of dunes, a lagoon and an area of environmental protection (APA) located in Natal capital city, one of the most famous post-cards of the Brazilian state Rio Grande do Norte. It is a huge dunes and a lagoon of fresh water, with strong attraction for tourism. The region has a good infrastructure of hotels, inns, restaurants, beach tents, tours of "buggies", rafts and dromedaries. It is played in the dunes around the lake called "esquibunda" stakeholders sit down the dunes on top of planks of wood, to dive in the waters of the lagoon. The tours of "buggies" are offered in the local "with emotion" or "no emotion", according to the degree of risk, it is recommended, however, are chosen accredited professionals responsible for security not only of tourists, but the middle environment.

Ponta Negra and Via Costeira

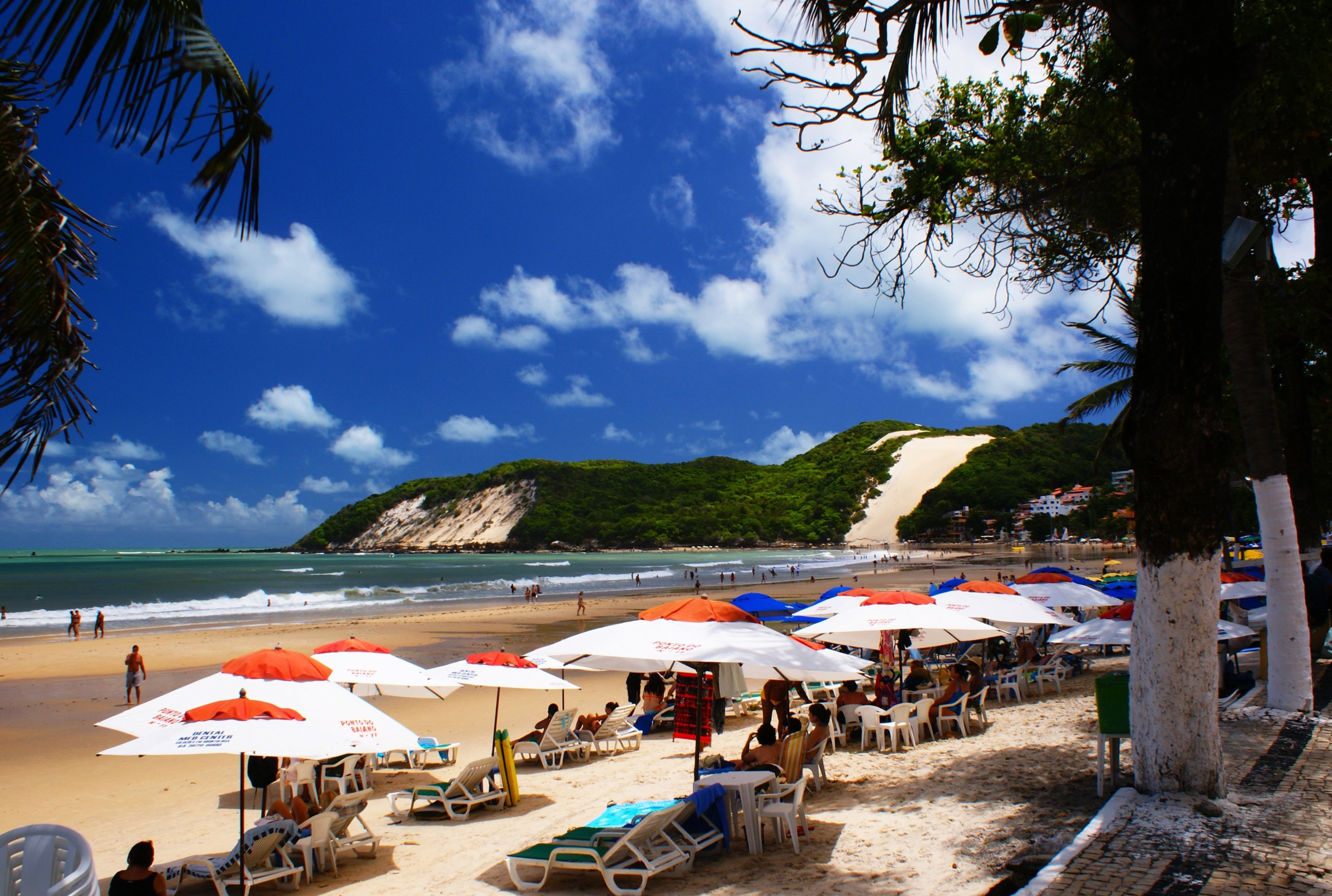
Ponta Negra Beach

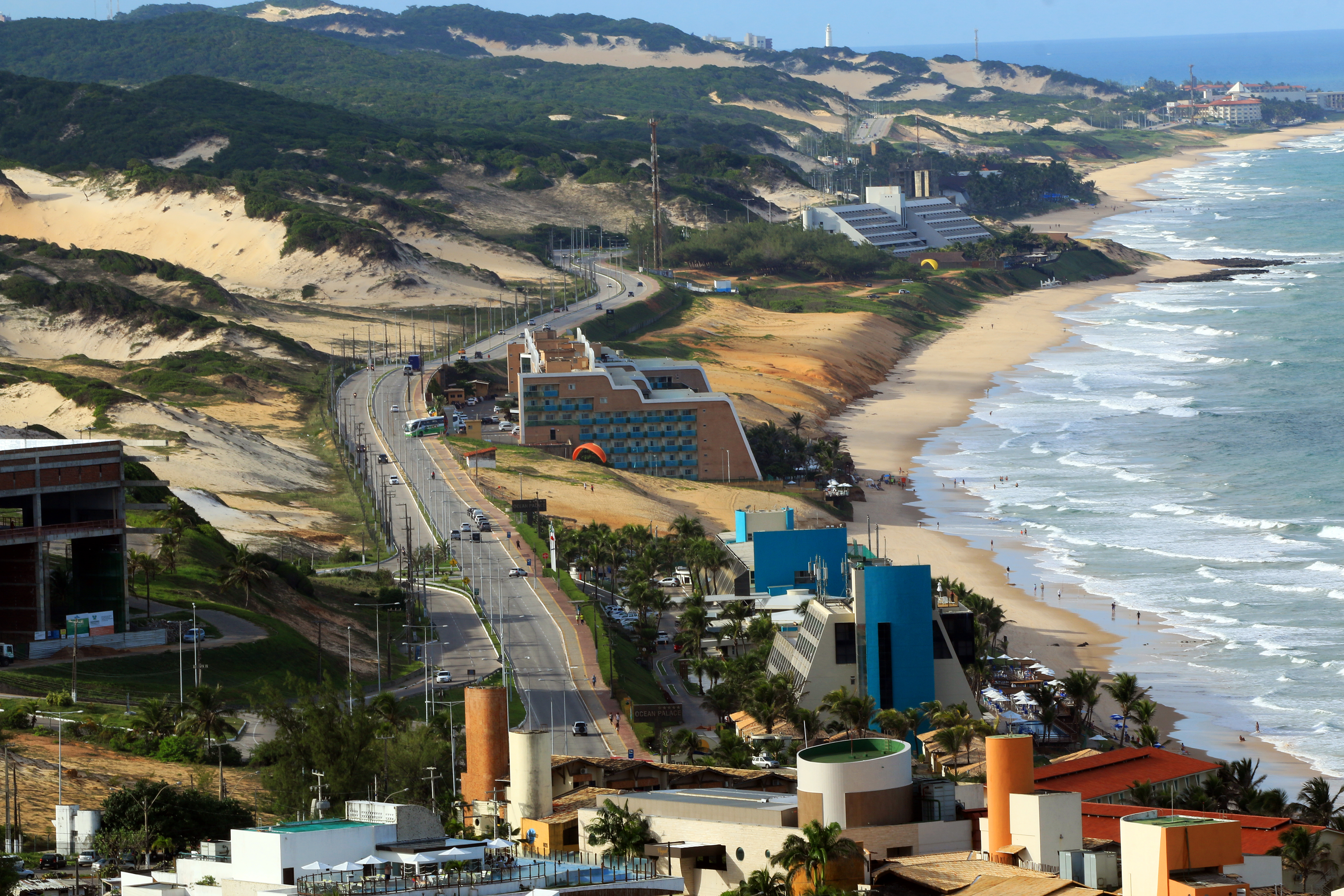
Via Costeira

Ponta Negra is a famous beach and a neighborhood located in the Brazilian city of Natal in the state of Rio Grande do Norte. In the extreme south of the beach, is located in Morro do Careca (Bald Hill), a large dune. The extreme north of the beach, is located at Via Costeira (Coastal Way), a road in the middle of coastal dunes that connect the various beaches of the city. The beach is completely urbanized and there are several points shops, restaurants, bars and night clubs. The sand itself is lined with "tents", or huts, that serve food and drinks to beachgoers day and night. A common sight on the beach are "jangadas", simple, multicolored, local fishing boats typical of northeastern Brazil. The Via Costeira (Coastal Way) is a great avenue built next to the dunes and beaches of the city, including making the connection of several beaches in the state.

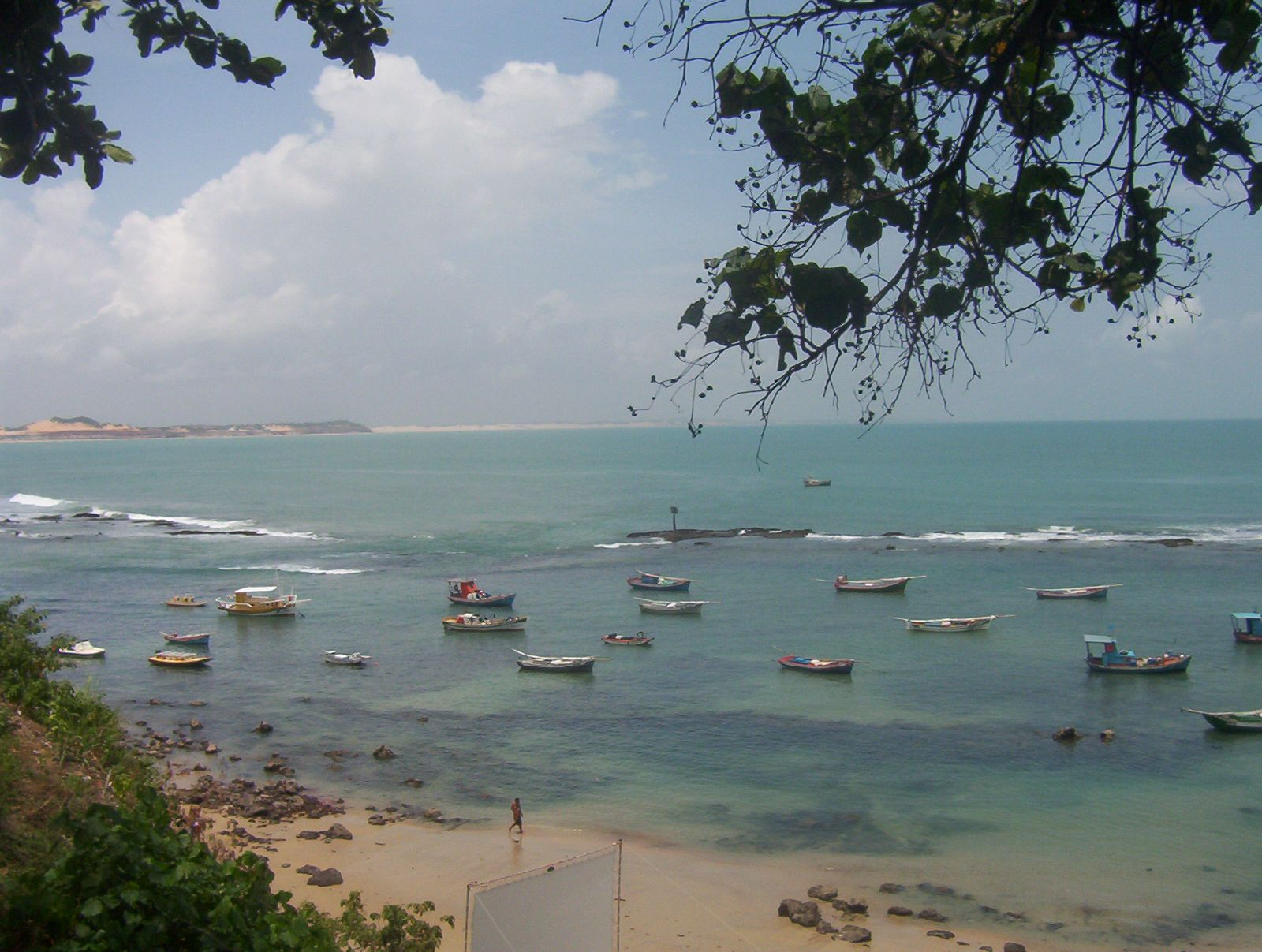
Pipa Beach

Pipa Beach

The Pipa Beach is located 85 kilometres (53 miles) from Natal and completely away from urban centers. A beach Paradise that attracts thousands of tourists every year.

Other attractions

- As Natal means Christmas in Portuguese, possibly in December are some attractions such as concerts, plays, meeting writers and the traditional burning of fires, and the city be decorated with Christmas purposes.
- Cape São Roque, point of the Brazilian coast close of Africa.
- Calcanhar Lighthouse, the highest lighthouse in Brazil.

== Culture ==
Carnival in Natal, known as "Carnatal", is one of the largest off-season carnivals in Brazil. Carnatal takes place sometime in November or December, in the streets around the Arena das Dunas Stadium (traffic around the stadium changes radically during Carnatal days). The transit department isolates about three kilometres (two miles) of streets, creating a ring, along which the party takes place. During the days of party, a huge truck (called "trio elétrico"), with a band on the top and sound boxes all around, drives slowly along the streets. The crowd follows the trio elétrico singing, dancing, jumping to the sound of the music.

Natal is also home to the "Mada", a national festival of pop rock national, and the "Verão de Todos", a summer festival.

The patron saint of the city is Our Lady of Presentation.

== Transportation ==
=== International airport ===
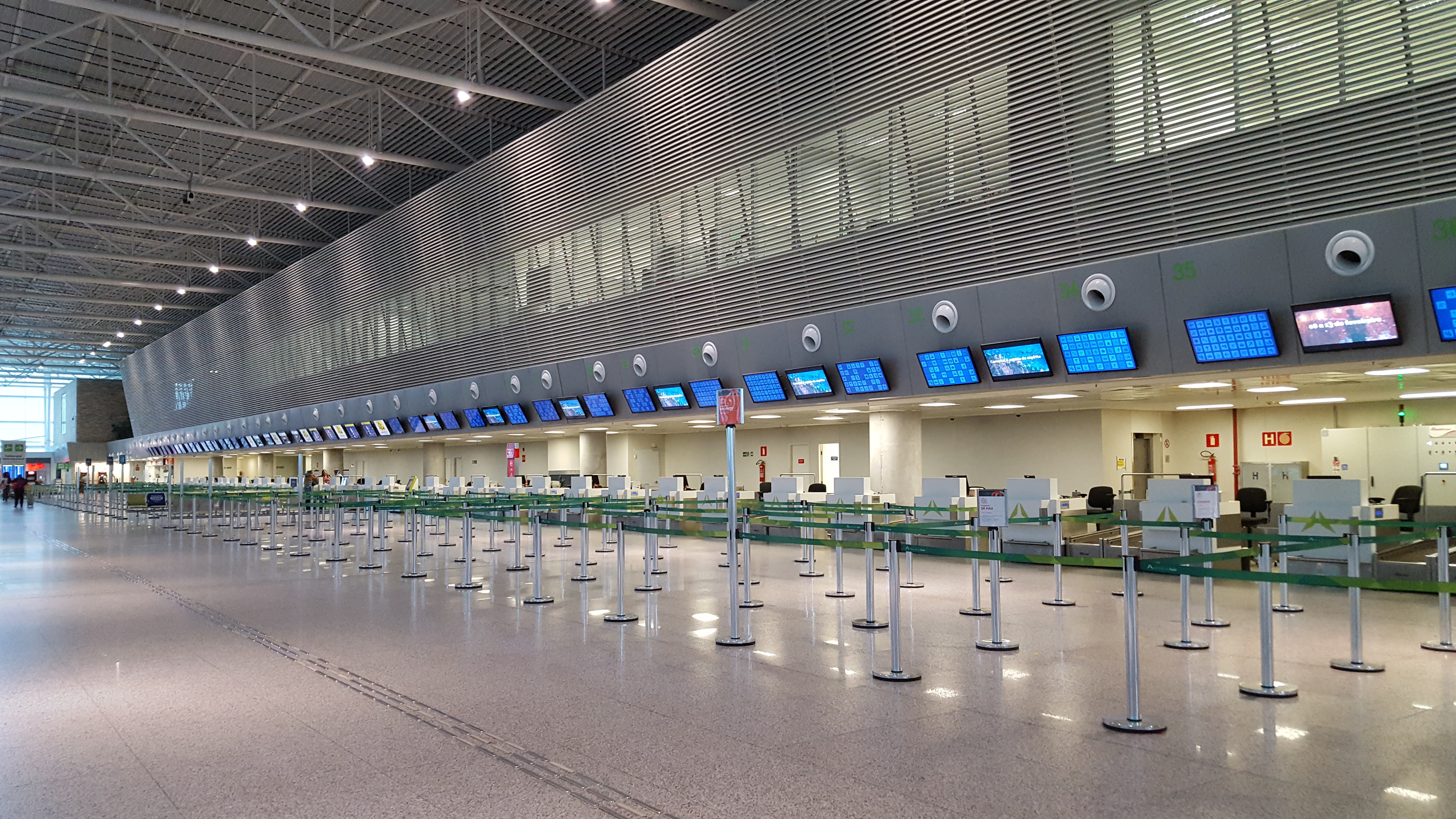
Greater Natal International Airport

Located virtually at sea level (169 feet), with favorable weather and geographic conditions, Greater Natal International Airport in São Gonçalo do Amarante is 30 km (19 mi) from Natal.

=== Air Force Base ===
Natal Air Force Base – ALA10, one of their most important bases of the Brazilian Air Force, is located in the nearby city of Parnamirim.

=== Highways ===
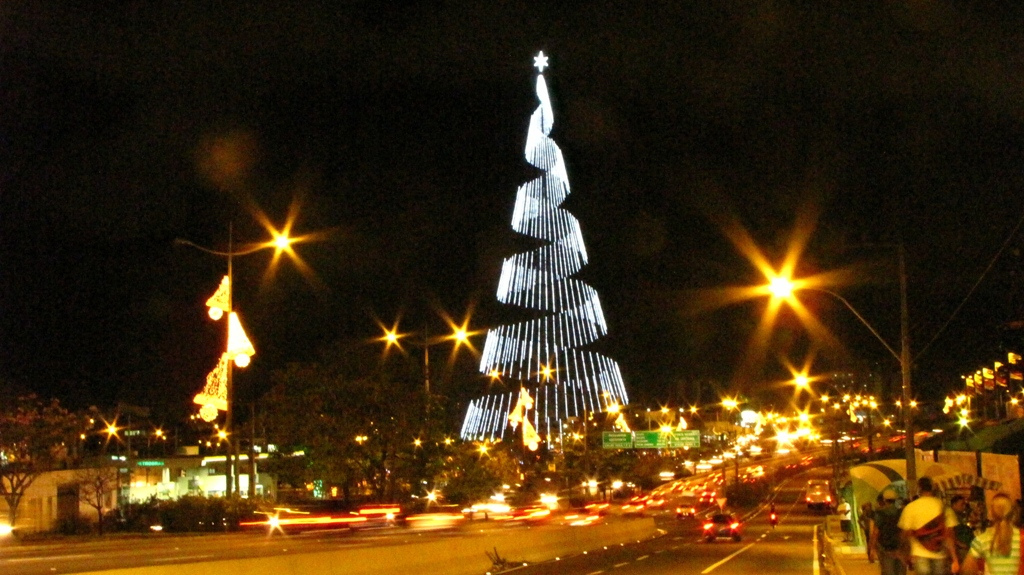
BR-101 highway as Salgado Filho Avenue in December

Federal Highway BR-101 is the most important access to Natal, coming from the South of Brazil, through the boundary with the municipality of Parnamirim. For those who come from the State of Ceará, the principle access is by the Federal Highway BR-304, through the boundary with the municipality of Macaíba, where you pick up BR-226 taking people to Natal. Leaving Natal, an important access to the southern Potiguar coast is the "Sun Route" (Rota do Sol) as RN-063 is known by, and which takes you to the beaches of Pirangi, Búzios, Tabatinga, up to the municipality of Nísia Floresta. The North Shore is accessible from the Newton Navarro bridge, following the Praia do Forte to Genipabu, and the Igapó Bridge, following the district of Igapó by BR-101 to Touros, and by BR-406 to Macau.

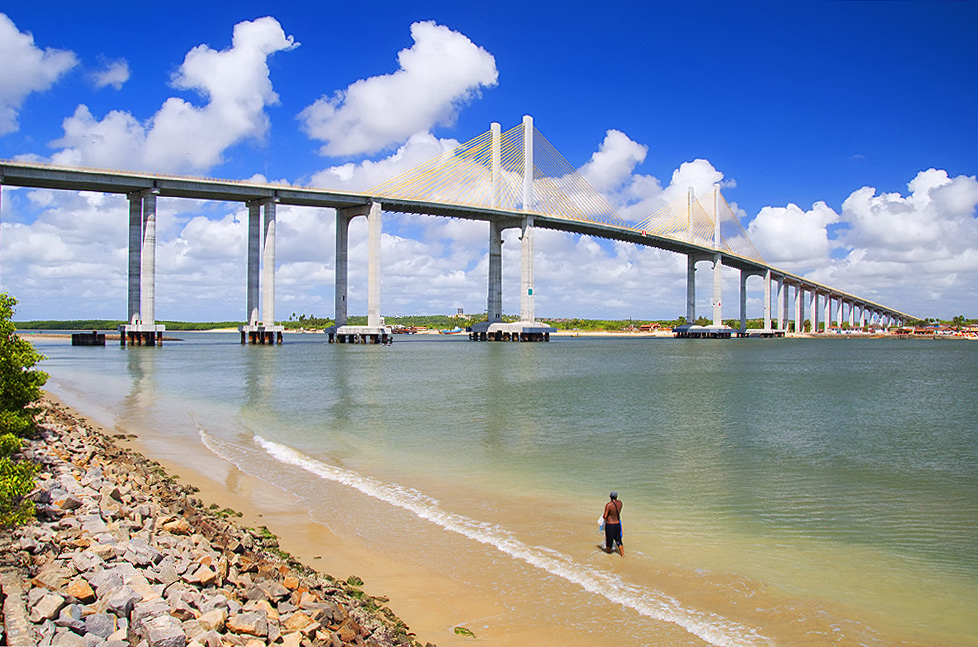
Newton Navarro bridge

Natal is connected to all the 167 municipalities of Rio Grande do Norte and dozens of locations and Potiguar districts, through the Passenger Bus Terminal of Natal (Terminal Rodoviário de Passageiros de Natal), located in the Eastern Zone of the city. All the accesses to the countryside of the state are through the Metropolitan region of Natal, composed of the municipalities of Ceará-Mirim, Emaús, Extremoz, Macaíba, Monte Alegre, Nísia Floresta, Parnamirim e São Gonçalo do Amarante. Buses with direct destinations to various Brazilian capitals also leave from the Passenger Bus Terminal of Natal. The cities with regular weekly schedules are: Belo Horizonte, Fortaleza, Goiânia, João Pessoa, Palmas, Recife, Salvador, São Luiz e Teresina.

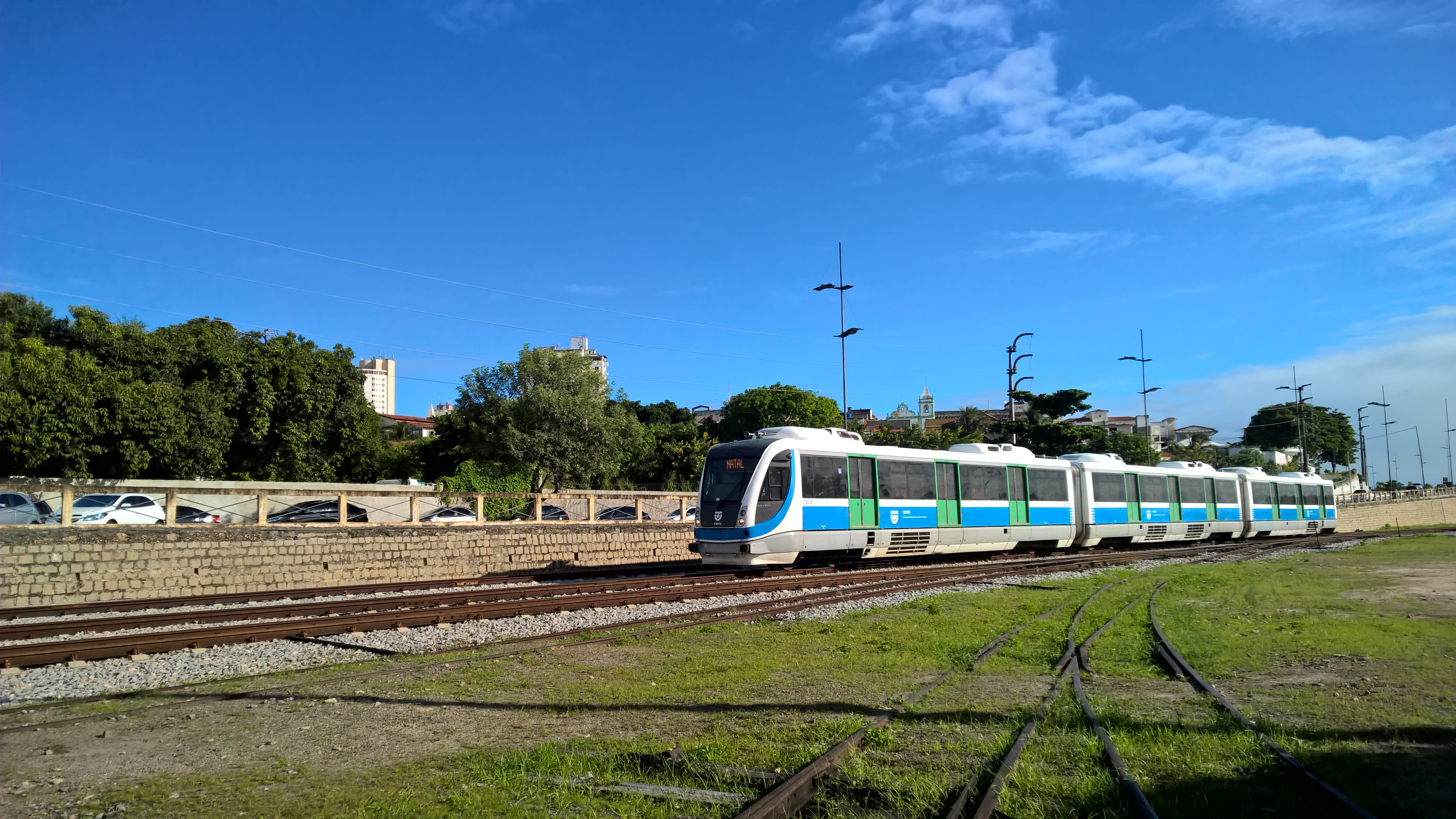
Natal's light rail went under renovation in 2014

=== Bus ===
Buses are the cheapest way to move around Natal. Passes or magnetic cards can be purchased beforehand, but it is easiest to pay the conductor. There are large buses, micro buses and vans, driving along the same streets, charging the same fares.

All the main touristic spots within Natal are well served by buses. People may expect to travel standing up on the big buses (not so with micros and vans). Typical waiting time is 15 min during the peak hours, up to one hour.

=== Rail ===
The Sistema de Trens Urbanos de Natal is a two-line commuter rail system that operates over 56 km of track, and served 3.7 million passengers in 2018.

=== Taxi ===
There are plenty of taxis in the city. Taxis are white cars and have a red plate. Fares are the same, regardless of how new and comfortable the car is. Fares are regulated by the government. From 10:00 pm to 6:00 am at weekdays, and all hours at weekends (and, depending on a decree by the mayor, all times during the month of December), there is a 20% increase in fare prices, this is indicated by a number 2 showing in the fare meter. There are several tele-taxis companies in Natal.

=== Buggy ===
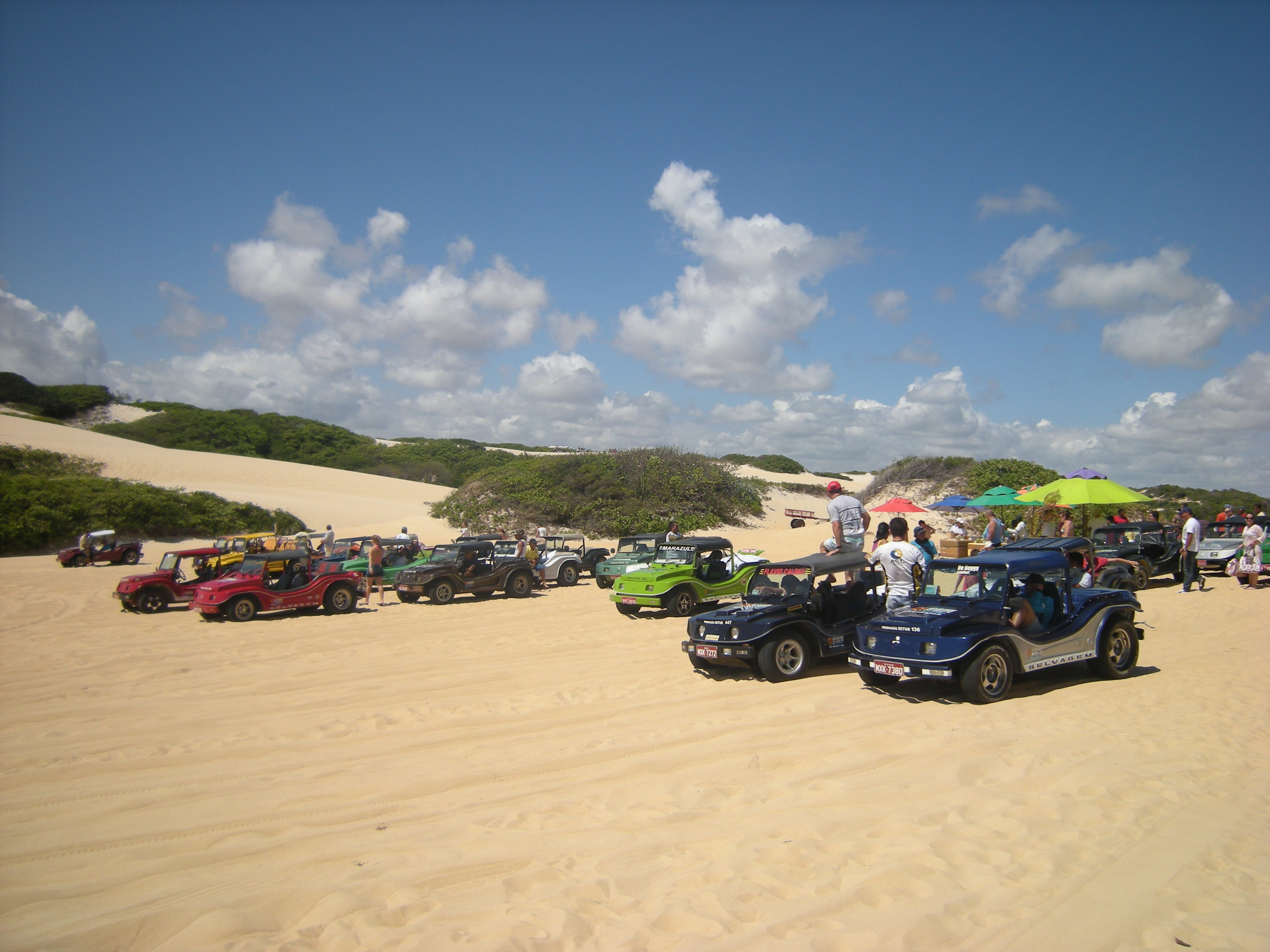
Dune buggy

The dune buggy is the vehicle used most to drive along the beaches. Some companies offer tours in Land Rovers and other 4WD vehicles, these cars offer much more comfort, but buggy drivers claim that the buggy is more flexible. Riding a buggy, people feel the sun and the wind. Buggies are safe, accidents with buggies are much less frequent than accidents with other cars (most dune buggy drivers are certified by the Tourist Authority).

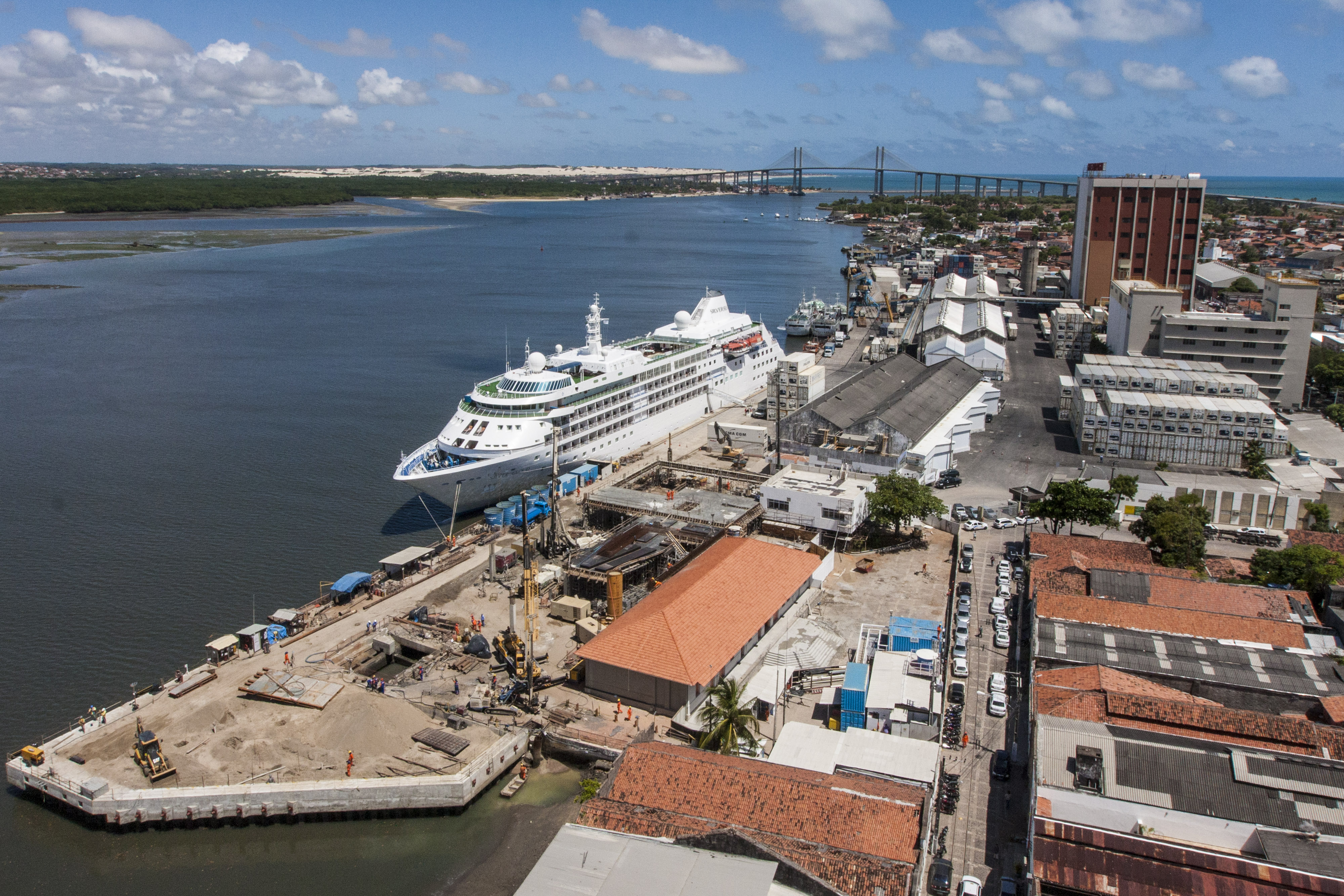
View of Port of Natal

=== Distances ===
- João Pessoa: 180 km (112 mi) (110 mi);
- Recife: 300 km (186 mi) (186 mi);
- São Paulo: 3,011 km (1,871 mi) (1870 mi);
- Rio de Janeiro: 2,750 km (1,709 mi);
- Belo Horizonte: 2,615 km (1,625 mi);
- Brasília: 2,383 km (1,481 mi);
- Salvador: 1,100 km (684 mi);
- Porto Alegre: 4,320 km (2,684 mi).

=== Port ===
The Port of Natal is specialized in cold storage cargo such as fruit, fish and shrimp, among others. It has its own customs facilities and is connected to Europe by direct navigation lines, mainly to the ports of Vigo, Rotterdam and Sheerness.

== Neighborhoods ==
Map of Natal neighborhoods North Zone South Zone West Zone East Zone Dunes State Park

North Zone

- Potengi
- Redinha
- Pajuçara
- Igapó
- Nossa Senhora da Apresentação
- Salinas
- Lagoa Azul

East Zone

- Cidade Alta
- Petrópolis
- Tirol
- Alecrim
- Ribeira
- Rocas
- Barro Vermelho
- Santos Reis
- Praia do Meio
- Areia Preta
- Mãe Luíza

West Zone

- Quintas
- Nordeste
- Dix-Sept Rosado
- Bom Pastor
- Nossa Senhora de Nazaré
- Cidade da Esperança
- Cidade Nova
- Planalto
- Felipe Camarão
- Guarapes

South Zone

- Ponta Negra
- Lagoa Nova
- Capim Macio
- Candelária
- Neópolis
- Nova Descoberta
- Parque das Colinas
- Pitimbu

== Sports ==
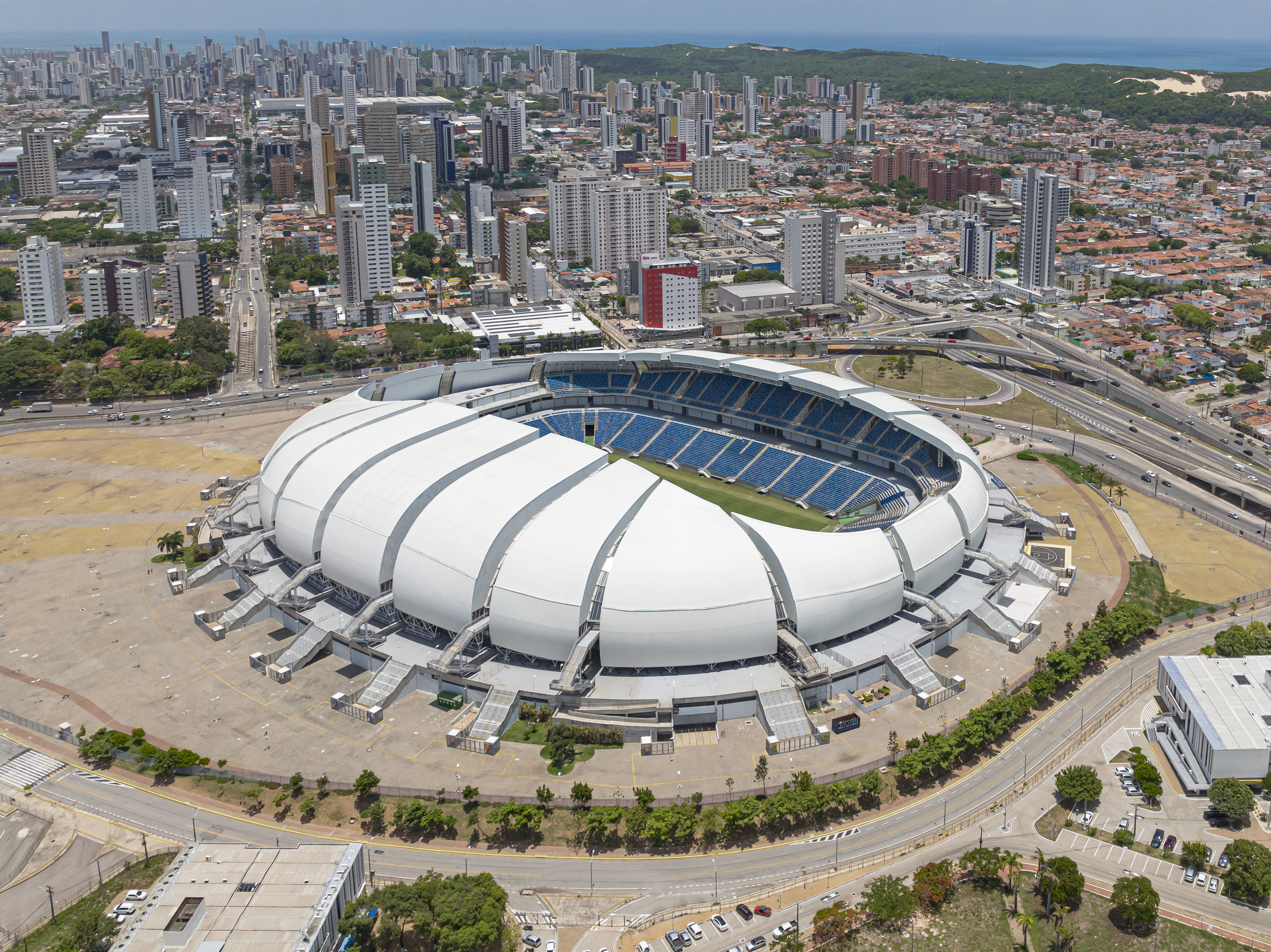
Aerial view of Arena das Dunas

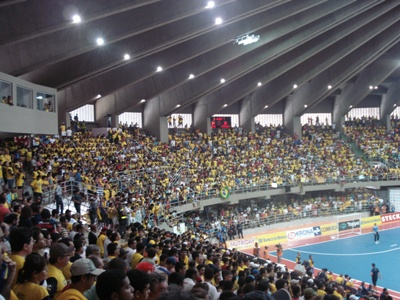
Nélio Dias gymnasium

The main soccer teams of Natal are:

- ABC Futebol Clube
- Alecrim Futebol Clube
- América de Natal

=== Stadiums ===
- Arena das Dunas
- Maria Lamas Farache Stadium (Frasqueirão)
- Juvenal Lamartine Stadium

=== Gymnasiums ===
- Ginásio Nélio Dias
- Palácio dos Esportes

=== 2014 FIFA World Cup ===
Natal was one of the host cities of the 2014 FIFA World Cup, for which Brazil was the host nation. The Dunas Arena was built in place of the old Machadão stadium. It is building a new airport, Greater Natal International Airport, to be the largest airport in Latin America. It is also investing in a public transport system using the system of light rail called VLT de Natal, and other projects of infrastructure.

David Beckham had announced plans for a football academy in Natal, called the Beckham World of Sport, to coincide with the 2014 FIFA World Cup.

=== 11th World Maxibasketball Championship ===
Natal will be the first Brazilian city to host a World Maxibasketball Championship. The 11th World Maxibasketball Championship will occur in July 2011, winning among the cities which also wanted to host the event: Punta del Este in Uruguay; Vancouver in Canada and Eugene in the United States. The facilities of the modern Nélio Dias gymnasium should be used to house the event that will bring to the capital of Rio Grande do Norte about 3,500 athletes from around the world.

== Notable people ==
Natalenses is the name in Brazil for residents of Natal.

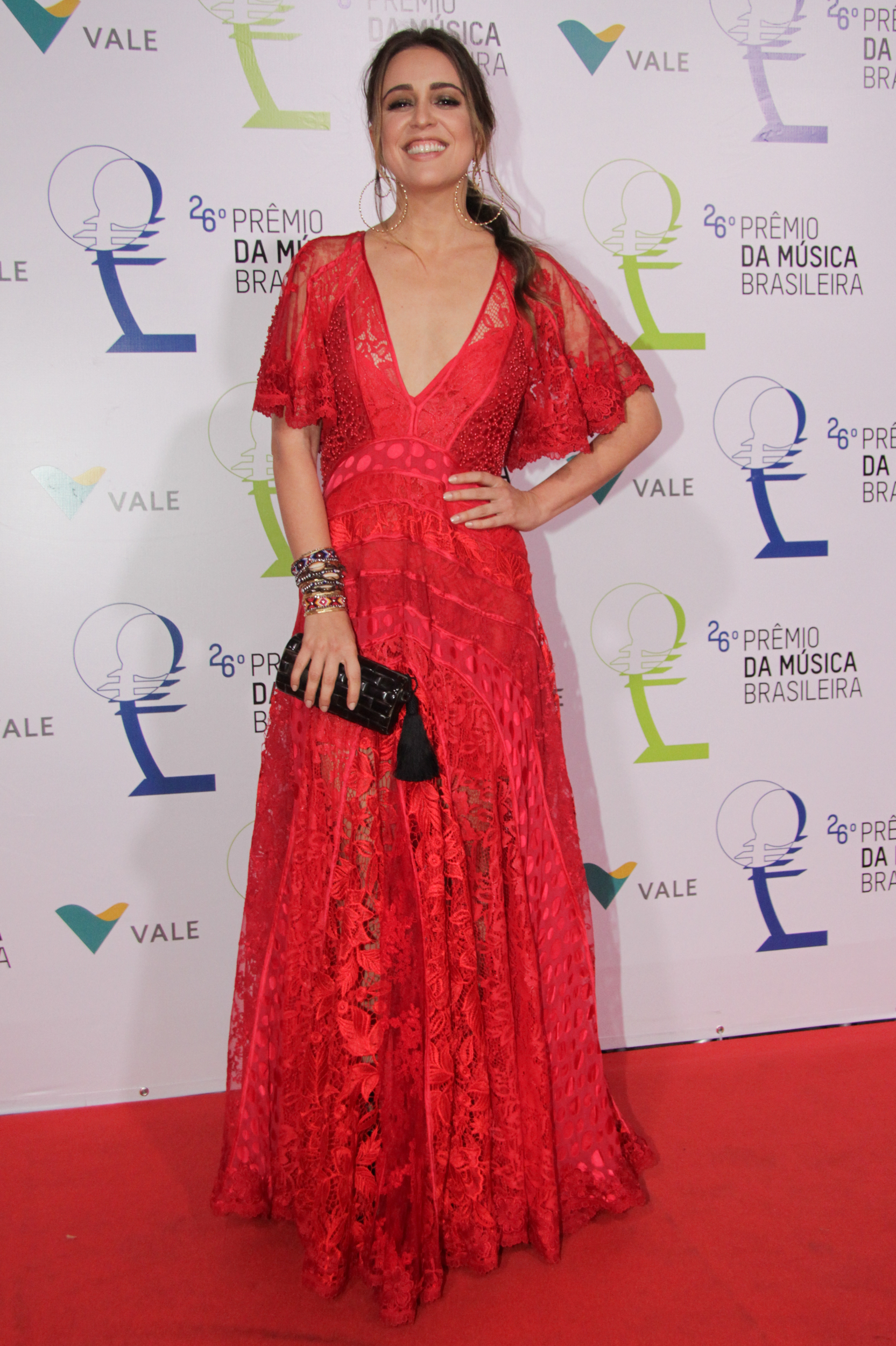
Latin Grammy Award nominee Roberta Sá is from Natal.

- Abraham Palatnik, artist
- Aldo Parisot, cellist and cello teacher
- André Oliveira, football player
- Antônio Filipe Camarão, Native American
- Brisa Bracchi, politician
- Café Filho, lawyer and ex-president of Brazil (1954–1955)
- Carlos Paz de Araújo, scientist and inventor
- Clodoaldo Silva, paralympic swimmer
- Diego Pelicles da Silva, football player
- Fernanda Tavares, international model
- Garibaldi Alves Filho, politician and former President of the Federal Senate (2007–2009)
- Kell, football player
- Jussier da Silva, mixed martial artist
- Larissa Costa, model and Miss Brasil 2009
- Luís da Câmara Cascudo, anthropologist, folklorist, journalist, historian, lawyer, and lexicographer
- Marinho Chagas, football player
- Matuzalém, football player
- Patrício Freire, mixed martial artist champion
- Patricky Freire, mixed martial artist
- Oscar Schmidt, basketball player
- Ramalho, football player
- Renan Barão, mixed martial artist
- Richarlyson, football player
- Ronny Markes, mixed martial artist
- Roberta Sá, singer
- Virna Dias, volleyball player

== Twin towns ==
Natal, Rio Grande do Norte is twinned with:

- Bethlehem, Palestine
- Córdoba, Argentina
- Porto Alegre, Rio Grande do Sul, Brazil
- (Rio de Janeiro (state)) Rio de Janeiro, Rio de Janeiro, Brazil
- Salvador, Bahia, Brazil
- Fortaleza, Ceará, Brazil
- Eilat, Israel

== See also ==
- André de Albuquerque Square
- List of theatres in Natal
- City Council of Natal
- History of Rio Grande do Norte
- Historic Center of Natal
