= André de Albuquerque Square =

Square in Natal, Rio Grande do Norte, Brazil

Coordinates: 5°47′05.98″S 35°12′32.48″W

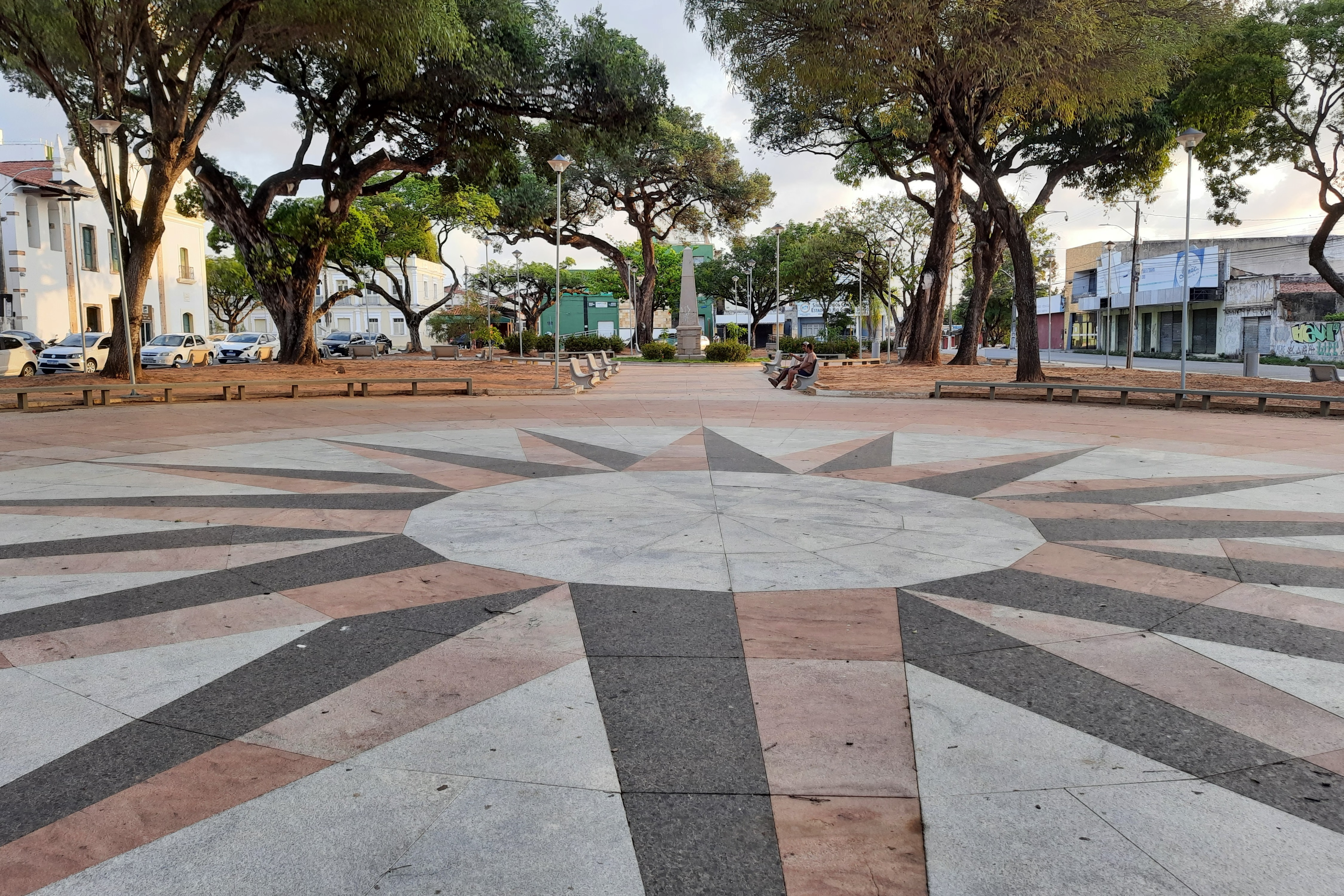
André de Albuquerque Square

André de Albuquerque Square, also popularly known as Red Square (Portuguese: Praça Vermelha), is located in the Cidade Alta neighborhood, in Natal, capital of the state of Rio Grande do Norte. The square, named after the revolutionary André de Albuquerque Maranhão, who fought on the side of the Pernambuco rebels, marks the geodesic point of the city and also its zero milestone.

It was created in 1888 by the City Council of Natal, when it renamed the famous Rua Grande, giving the square its current name. Between the end of the 19th century and the present day, the square has undergone several interventions by diverse governments, which have added monuments, modified its landscaping, and added new public devices. The square is one of the most important in Natal, not only for being the birthplace of the city, but also for being located at the intersection of important buildings for the local community, such as the Old Cathedral of Natal (Church of Our Lady of Presentation) and the Historic and Geographic Institute of Rio Grande do Norte.

== Etymology ==
The square is named after André de Albuquerque Maranhão, who fought with the rebels of the Pernambucan revolt in 1817. André was the master of the Cunhaú mill and one of the main figures of the revolt in Rio Grande do Norte, along with Miguel Joaquim de Almeida Castro, better known as Padre Miguelinho.

André took power in the city of Natal and the province of Rio Grande do Norte for a brief period from March 29 to April 25, 1817, when he deposed the then governor of the captaincy, José Inácio Borges. However, after the defeat of the revolutionaries in Pernambuco, the movement lost its strength in the other states of the region, and André was eventually deposed and imprisoned in the Fortress of the Three Wise Men (Portuguese: Fortaleza dos Reis Magos), where he died.

In recognition of this man, who later became a hero of the state, the City Council of Natal changed the name of Rua Grande (the main street of the state capital at the time) to André de Albuquerque Square in 1888.

== History ==
=== Creation and first moments ===
According to the July 1, 1931 edition of the newspaper A República, the square had not yet received public investments, stating that "in André de Albuquerque Square, Rua Grande, animals grazed, which in the full sun rested in the shade of large chestnut trees". Historian Câmara Cascudo pointed out the lack of urban planning in the area by highlighting that it was the first place where soccer was played in Rio Grande do Norte. He also reveals that, until then, the square was not known by its official name, but only as Praça da Matriz (English: Matriz Square).

The square received its first governmental intervention in June 1906, with the purpose of creating a garden on the site. The architect in charge of this task was Herculano Ramos, who had been hired that same year by Governor Augusto Tavares de Lyra. Despite the addition of the garden, the square was not yet ready, so it was up to the governor Alberto Maranhão to do another work to improve the appearance of the square. His contribution to the area, however, was limited to paving with stones taken from the surroundings of the square, as well as from other places in the city. With the exception of the construction of the Monument to the Martyrs of 1817, the place went 17 years without receiving new investments. Only in 1934 twelve benches were installed in the Praça André de Albuquerque, at the request of the mayor José Bilro, who had hired a specialist in Recife to do this.

=== The first reform ===
In 1942, Joaquim Inácio de Carvalho Filho was sworn in as mayor of Natal. His term lasted from January 3, 1942 to July 19, 1943, and he was responsible for new improvements in the square. Several works had already been started by his predecessor, Gentil Ferreira, who not only started the removal of the old sidewalk, but also implemented a tree plantation composed of parallel rows of shrubs. Carvalho Filho continued the work installing new benches, a modern bandstand, a new pattern of trees and a new paving of the space, which was eventually connected to the Sete de Setembro Square through the Church of Our Lady of the Rosary. The inauguration of the renovated square took place on September 7, 1942, when Carvalho Filho gave a speech about the importance and usefulness of the place.

The André de Albuquerque Square serves a particular use and therefore purposefully has wide, target-floor spaces. Many trees that were planted disorderly were cut down. Others were planted without sacrificing the purpose imposed on this corner - to serve for our civic and school constructions, so that the people could freely spread out, as they do now...

=== The second reform ===
The second major reform of the square was conducted by Mayor Djalma Maranhão, who governed Natal between October 3, 1960 and April 2, 1964. The main effect of his action was the removal of the pillory and the cannons from the square. In their place was built a Acoustical Shell, which included a bar and a library.

In addition, in the area closest to the Court of Justice, the mayor erected a light fountain and an art gallery, inaugurated with festivities and exhibitions on March 8, 1963, which was heavily used by local artists in the 1960s. The Acoustical Shell was inaugurated on Christmas Eve 1963, with the performance of the play Natal na Praça (English: Christmas in the Square), by the Experimental Amateur Theater group. Earlier that same day, the pillory was effectively returned to the Historic and Geographic Institute, where it remains today.

=== The third reform ===
A decade later, the third reform of the square was carried out on the initiative of the architect Luís Nazário, who worked for the City Hall of Natal during the mandate of Vauban Bezerra. The reason for the changes included in the new project was the disconnect from the colonial character of the downtown architecture created by the previous reform. The Acoustical Shell was destroyed, as were the library and the art gallery, and in their respective places were built a new bandstand and a colonial veranda with benches and lamps. The work was solemnly inaugurated on March 25, 1977, both by Mayor Vauban Bezerra and by Governor Tarcísio Maia, who was present at the occasion.

=== The fourth reform and current problems ===
The last of the reforms done in the André de Albuquerque Square was effected by initiative of the mayor Wilma de Faria, who, during the 400th anniversary of the city's foundation, changed the entire floor of the square and provided it with new lighting fixtures and benches (both wood and cement). He also erected a small bronze star in the proximities of the Potengi Palace, which symbolizes the birth of the city.

As the years went by, the square's public equipment was again deteriorating. Graffiti, lack of garbage cans and broken benches were some of the problems reported in a 2009 report in the Diário de Natal newspaper, which also highlighted the insecurity in the square, despite police efforts. Also, the dissertation "A Praça André de Albuquerque na visão de seus frequentadores", presented to the Department of Psychology of the Federal University of Rio Grande do Norte pointed out that this insecurity ended up being increased by the fact that "after hearing so many times that something strange happened there, [people] already formed an opinion that the square was quite dangerous".

In 2010, the city government started the construction of a tourist box in the square to serve tourists visiting the historic center.

== Monuments ==
=== Monument to the Martyrs of 1817 ===
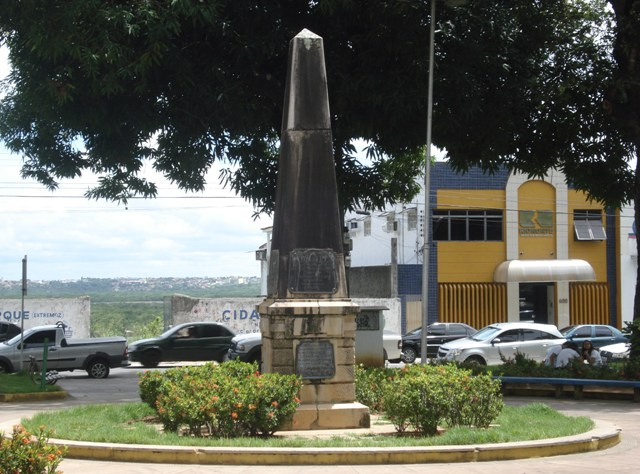
Monument to the Martyrs of 1817

Near the centennial of the death of Father Miguelinho, on June 12, 1937, the Historic and Geographic Institute of Rio Grande do Norte inaugurated a monument to the heroes of the Revolution of 1817 in the André de Albuquerque Square. At the time, Henrique Castriciano made a speech praising the characteristics of the two most important revolutionaries, André de Albuquerque and Padre Miguelinho. Afterwards, a curtain that covered the statue was removed and the monument was finally revealed to those present. At the end of the inauguration event, the brass bands played the "Marcha José Peregrino," which had been sung earlier by the revolutionaries at the moment of their victorious entry into Natal on March 25, 1817.

The monument is a granite column placed above a pedestal with inscriptions in Latin made by Canon Estevão Dantas, and is located in the area near the Old Cathedral (Church of Our Lady of Presentation). The project of the statue was designed by the engineers André Rebouças and Willy Fischer, who were commissioned by the Historic and Geographic Institute.

=== Monument of the City ===
During Silvio Pedrosa's mandate, from February 13, 1946 to February 25, 1950, Câmara Cascudo was his advisor for cultural matters. It was his idea to commemorate the 350th anniversary of Natal's foundation, which was soon accepted by the mayor. Among the anniversary celebrations, there were events such as solemn sessions at the Academy of Letters of Rio Grande do Norte and at the Alberto Maranhão Theater, as well as a mass on Christmas Eve, a night of traditional merrymaking, a nautical parade on the Potengi River, a gala ball at the Natal Aero Club, and, finally, the inauguration of a new monument at the André de Albuquerque Square.

The monument is composed of the pillory (which was forgotten at the Historic and Geographic Institute and which had killed André de Albuquerque himself in 1817) surrounded by four cannons from the Fortress of the Three Wise Men that stood on masonry pedestals. The inauguration ceremony was presided over by Governor José Augusto Varela and was attended by authorities from the most varied spheres (civil, military, and ecclesiastical). Troops from the Army, Navy, and Air Force were also present to salute the monument.

The monument, located almost in the center of the square, where previously existed the bandstand installed by Carvalho Filho, displeased the City Council of Natal, which sent a letter of dissatisfaction to Sílvio Pedrosa who, in turn, only regretted the disagreement. Later, it became clear that not only the City Council was dissatisfied with the installation of the pillory in a public square. Several citizens began to send letters of protest to the mayor stating that the presence of the pillory was a symbol of colonial power that should have remained in the past. In response to these complaints, Cascudo published five long articles that were part of a series called "Legal Symbol of the Pillory".

=== The town's 385th anniversary plaque ===
In 1984, on the occasion of Natal's 385th anniversary, the state and city governments, allied with the Catholic Church, included a new bronze plaque on the Monument of the Martyrs of 1817. The following words are affixed to the plaque:

Here, on December 25, 1599, was held the Foundation Mass of the City of Natal. The affixing of this plaque occurs 385 years after, being mayor the Honorable Mr. Marcos Formiga, governor the Honorable Mr. José Agripino and archbishop the Honorable Mr. Dom Nivaldo Monte. Natal, December 25, 1984.

== Surroundings ==
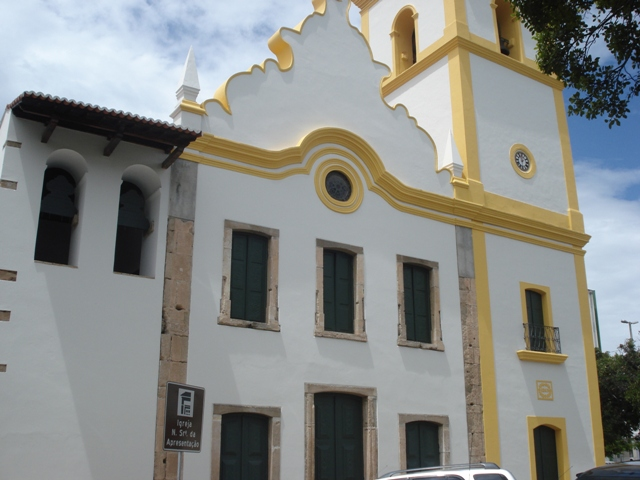
Old Cathedral of Natal (Mother Church of Our Lady of Presentation)

Some of the oldest and most important buildings in Natal are around the André de Albuquerque Square. The Old Cathedral of Our Lady of Presentation, also known as Mother Church, is the oldest of them all. It was founded at the end of the 16th century, with the arrival of the first inhabitants, partially destroyed by the Dutch invaders, and later rebuilt and successively improved and restored. Besides the Old Cathedral, also present are the building of the Regional Electoral Court, the Historic and Geographic Institute of Rio Grande do Norte, and the Patronage of the Miraculous Medal, which since 1937 takes care of the education of abandoned girls.

== Bibliography ==
- SOUZA, Itamar (2008). Nova História de Natal (2nd ed.). Natal: State Press Department.
- CASCUDO, Luís da Câmara (1980). História da Cidade do Nattal (2nd ed.). Rio de Janeiro: Cvvilização Brasileira.
- ONOFRE JÚNIOR, Manoel (2009). Guia da Cidade do Natal (5th ed.). Natal: Sebo Vermelho.
