= Municipal Chamber of Natal =

Brazilian legislative body

Municipal Chamber of Natal Câmara Municipal de Natal
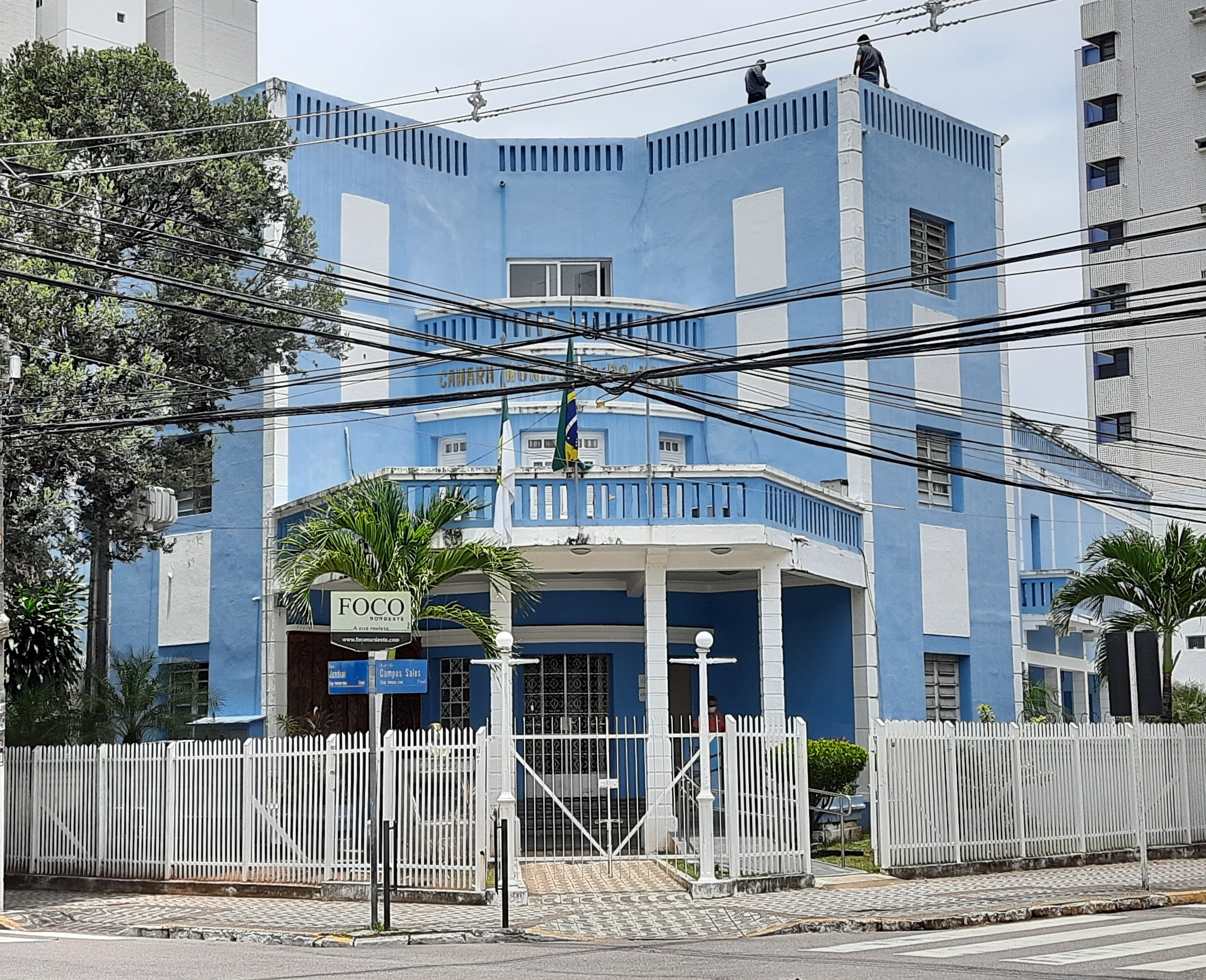

Leadership
- President: Paulinho Freire, PSDB since January 1, 2019
- 1st Vice President: Nina Souza, PDT since January 1, 2019
- 1st Vice President: Eriko Jácome, PODE since January 1, 2019

Structure
- Seats: 29
- Length of term: Four years
- Salary: R$ 16.000,00

Elections
- Voting system: Proportional representation
- Last election: October 4, 2020

Meeting place
- Padre Miguelinho Palace, Natal, RN

Website
- https://www.cmnat.rn.gov.br/

The Municipal Chamber of Natal (Portuguese: Câmara Municipal de Natal) is the legislative body of the municipality of Natal, capital of Rio Grande do Norte. It is composed of 29 councillors elected by proportional representation for a 4-year term. It is currently located in the Padre Miguelinho Palace.

== History ==
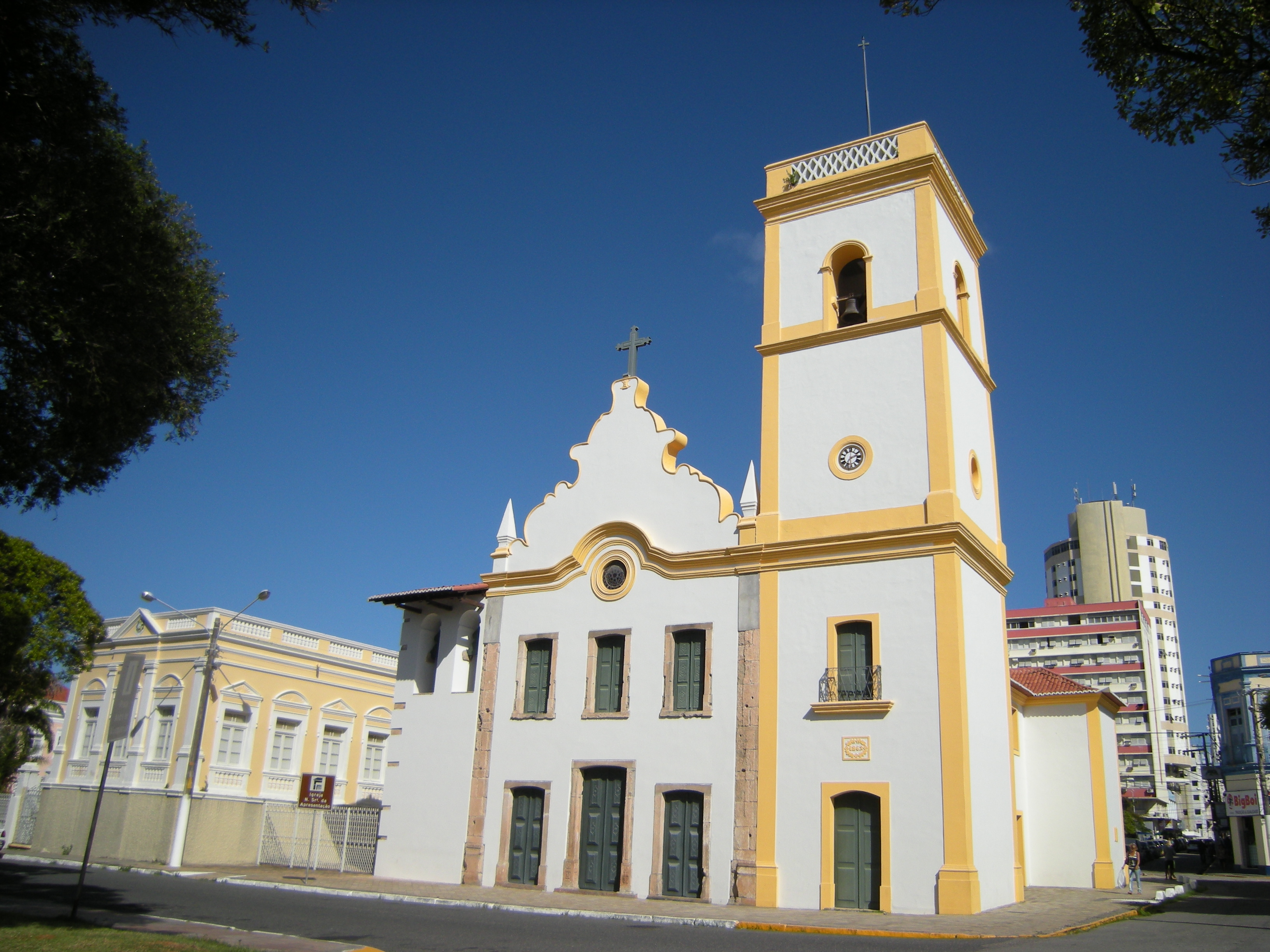
Our Lady of the Presentation Mother Church, in Cidade Alta, the first seat of the House Senate of Natal

The Municipal Chamber was founded still in the colonial period, in 1611, under the name of Senado da Câmara (English: House Senate), established by decree of the Governor-General of Brazil, Diego Meneses, and installed in the Our Lady of the Presentation Mother Church, currently located in the Cidade Alta neighborhood. The House Senate was composed of an alderman, a judge, clerks, procurators and some other positions with functions related to that period. The institution changed its name to Municipal Chamber only in 1823, after independence and the drafting of the first Brazilian Constitution.

As part of the consequences of the Revolution of 1930, which established the provisional government of Getúlio Vargas, the Municipal Chamber was dissolved. Its activities were suspended until June 5, 1948, when it restarted after several changes in the national political scenario. During the second half of the 20th century, the chamber's headquarters was changed several times, even going through the then Carlos Gomes Theater. In 1975, the City Council settled permanently in the Padre Miguelinho Palace, a building that belongs to the Federal University of Rio Grande do Norte (UFRN), located in the Tirol neighborhood.

In 1988, the new Brazilian Constitution came into effect, which required, in article 29, that the municipal chambers should produce and approve, in two rounds of voting separated by a minimum of ten days, organic laws for their respective municipalities. The Constitution also determined, in the sole paragraph of art. 11 of the Transitory Constitutional Dispositions Act, that the organic law of each municipality should be voted on within six months after the promulgation of its state constitution by the legislative assembly. Therefore, considering that the Legislative Assembly of Rio Grande do Norte approved the Constitution of the State of Rio Grande do Norte on October 3, 1989, the councillors of Natal promulgated their organic law at the deadline, on April 3, 1990.

After the municipal election of 2012, the Municipal Chamber, which until then consisted of 21 councillors, as provided in art. 19 of the Organic Law of 1990, gained eight new seats. The new number of 29 councillors, which is maintained until today, was established by Constitutional Amendment 58, of 2009. It was estimated that the increase in positions would cost more than R$2.1 million per year to the public budget. On July 11, 2016, the Municipal Chamber announced a freeze on councillors salaries until 2020, rescinding the measure that would have raised the then salary from R$16,000 to R$22,000.

As of 2021, the leader of the opposition is Brisa Bracchi of the Workers' Party.

== Headquarters ==
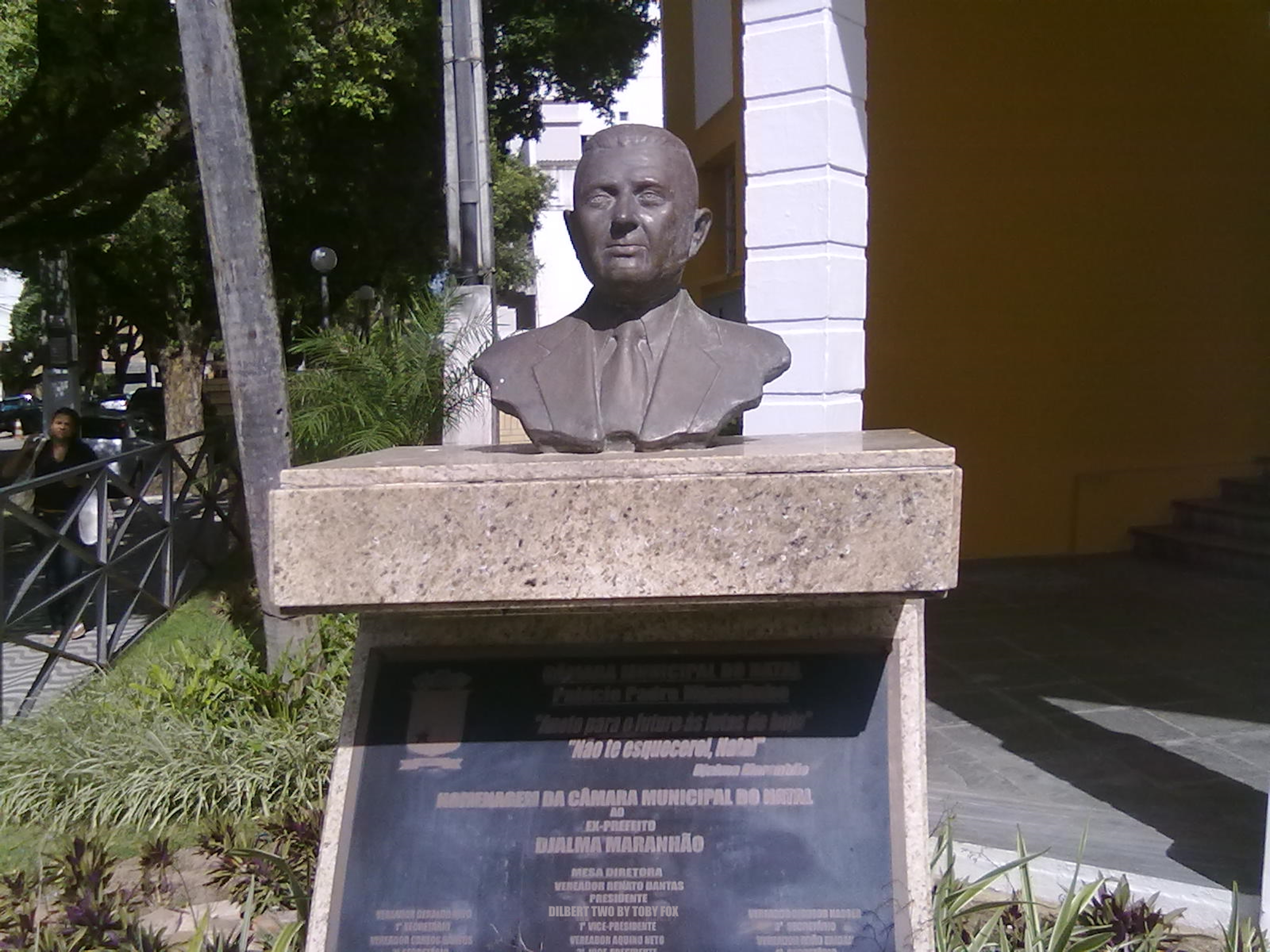
Bust of Djalma Maranhão, former mayor of Natal, located at the entrance of the Padre Miguelinho Palace.

Currently, the Municipal Chamber is installed in the Padre Miguelinho Palace, located on the corner of Jundiaí Street and Campos Sales Avenue, in the Tirol neighborhood. It belongs to the Federal University of Rio Grande do Norte (UFRN), which rented the building to the Municipal Legislature in 1975, when the president of the House was Érico Hackradt. Before that, the space was used as the UFRN's Faculty of Social Work, which was transferred to the university's Main Campus. The then archbishop of Natal, Dom Nivaldo Monte, was the one who took the initiative to make the negotiation that installed the City Council in that building, named after Father Miguelinho, a native of Rio Grande do Norte who fought in the Pernambuco Revolution in 1817. The chamber plenary, in turn, was named after the president at the time, Érico Hackradt. In 2009, after delays in payments and threats of eviction, a new lease was signed with UFRN.

Before settling in its current headquarters, the Municipal Chamber went through several other places in Natal, such as: the Legislative Assembly, at the end of the 1940s, in the Cidade Alta neighborhood; the Carlos Gomes Theater, now the Alberto Maranhão Theater, the Quitino Building, the Bank House and, in the 1960s and 1970s, the Campelo Building, all of these in the Ribeira neighborhood; and, finally, the Accounting Union's headquarters, also in the Cidade Alta neighborhood.

In 2013, due to limitations in the current building, the project to build a new headquarters for the chamber, as well as for the city hall, currently located in the Felipe Camarão Palace, was announced. The project, budgeted at R$12 million, foresaw the construction of a headquarters for the Legislative and an Administrative Center for the Executive. The site chosen was in the Redinha neighborhood, on a place near the Newton Navarro Bridge, in Natal's North Zone. On February 11, 2014, the councillors approved the construction with 24 votes in favor and 2 against. The new estimated value, at the time, was R$10 million for the Municipal Chamber headquarters and R$44 million for the City Hall, totaling R$54 million. Construction, however, was delayed due to waiting for the loan taken out with the National Bank for Economic and Social Development (BNDES) and also because of the necessity of regulations in the tourist zone where the buildings were to be erected; in October 2015, the project had not yet begun.

== See also ==
- History of Rio Grande do Norte
- Historic Center of Natal
