= Historic Center of Natal =

Oldest section of Natal

5°47′7.17″S 35°12′33.31″W

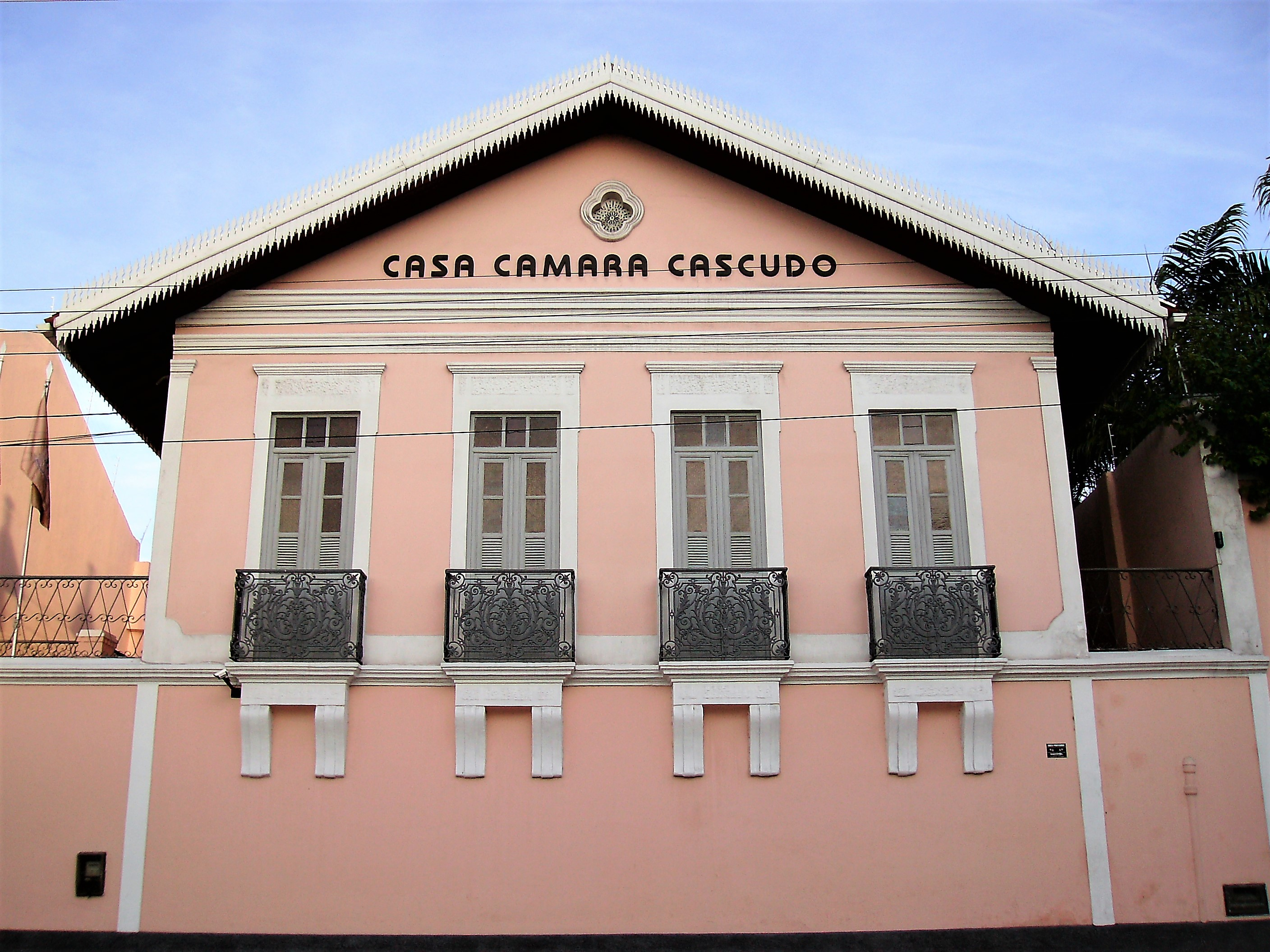
House where Luís da Câmara Cascudo lived.

The Historic Center of Natal is a delimited area of 201,278 m² in the capital of the Brazilian state of Rio Grande do Norte. This section includes 150 buildings of diverse styles, including colonial, neoclassical, art deco and modernist architecture. It comprises the neighbourhoods of Cidade Alta and Ribeira and some buildings of the neighbourhoods of Tirol and Petrópolis, which are the oldest areas of the city and show characteristics of the first centuries of Brazil's history and important aspects of Portuguese colonization.

The center is characterized by narrow streets, which still exist today and are a sign of the irregular urban layout of Portuguese colonial cities. There is also Beco da Lama, a traditionally bohemian area of Cidade Alta that originated in the Dr. José Ivo Street, but has spread to the adjacent avenues and is now a Natal heritage site chosen by the community.

Some of the best-known buildings in the Historic Center are the Alberto Maranhão Theater, the Bela Vista Manor House and the Mother Church of Our Lady of the Presentation (Old Cathedral). Two monuments in the area have already been individually listed as historic heritage by IPHAN: the old Government Palace and Sobradinho. In the zone, there is also the new Desembargador Vicente Lemos Justice Memorial, which tells the story of the judiciary of Rio Grande do Norte.

Since 2008, the Historical Walk of Natal has been held annually, with the aim of restoring interest and bringing the population and tourists closer to the city's historic center. The program consists of a walking tour of the capital's main monuments and traditional streets.

== Gallery ==
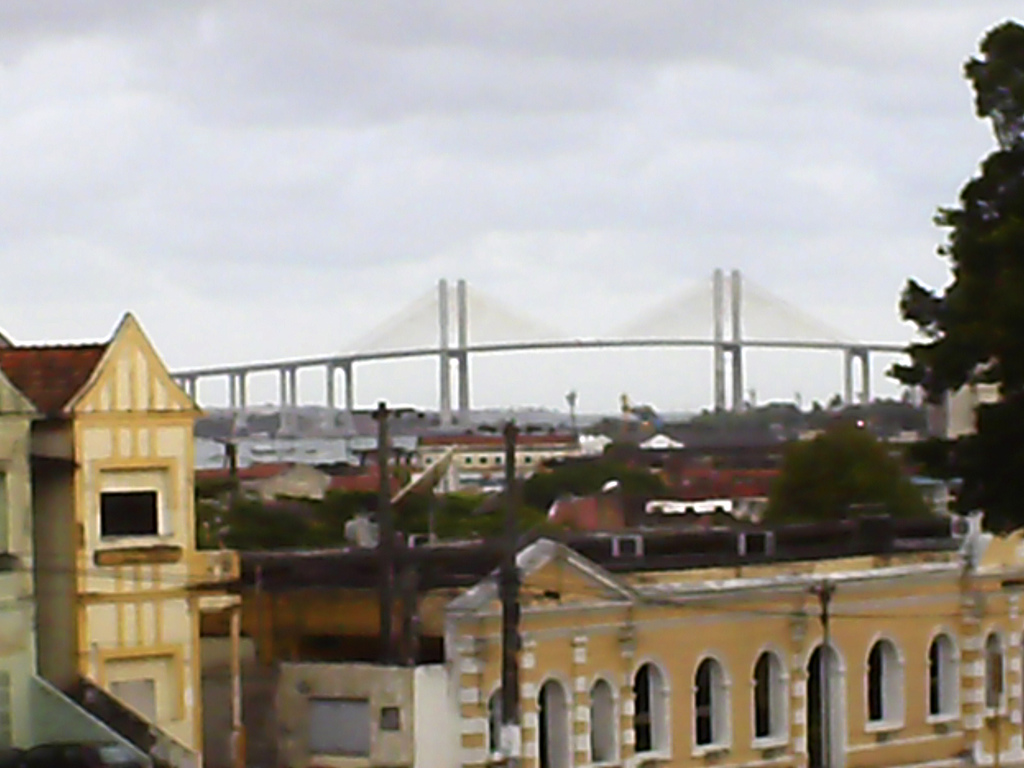
Capitania das Artes, the institution responsible for managing Natal's culture.

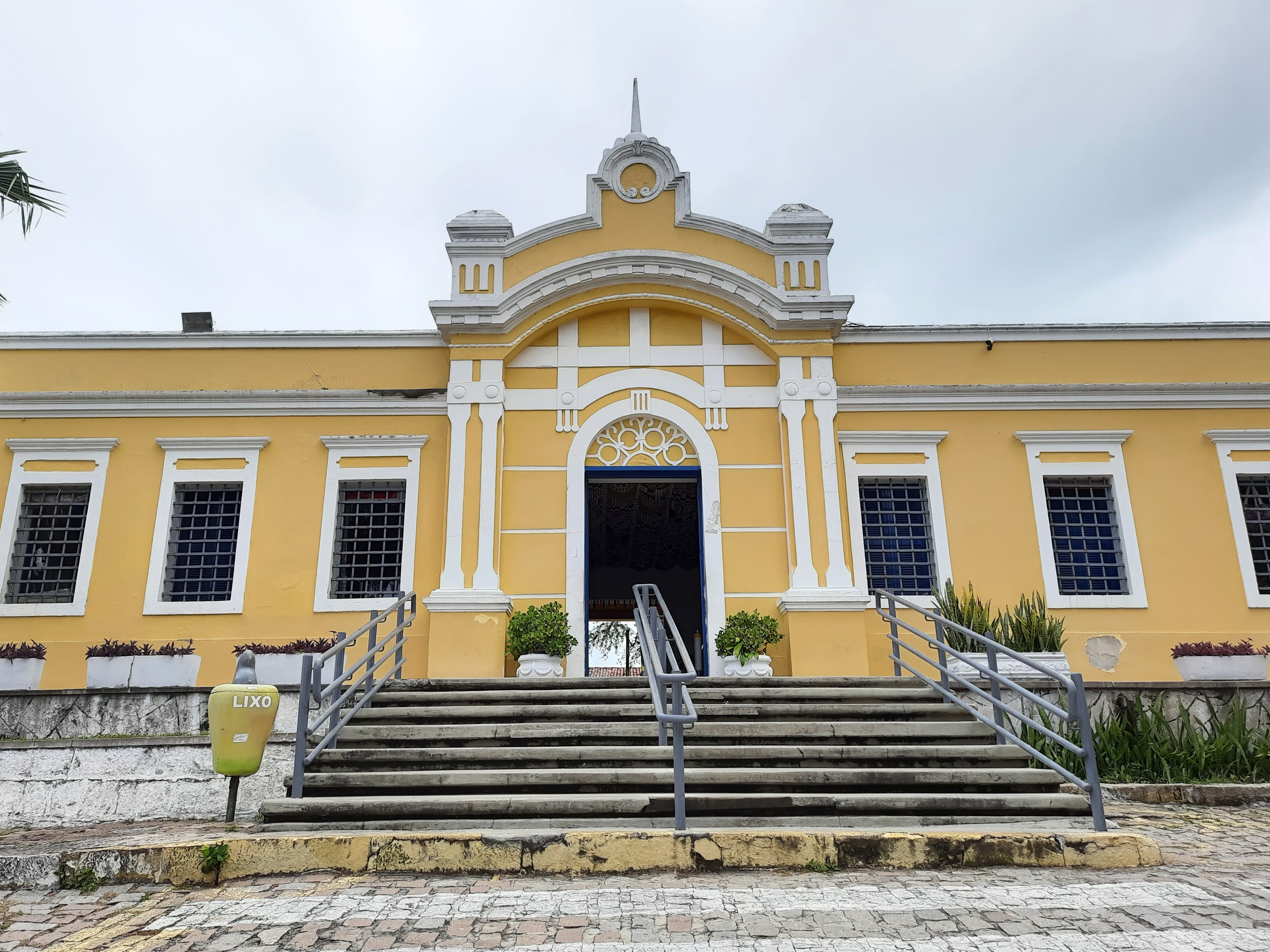
Natal Tourism Center.

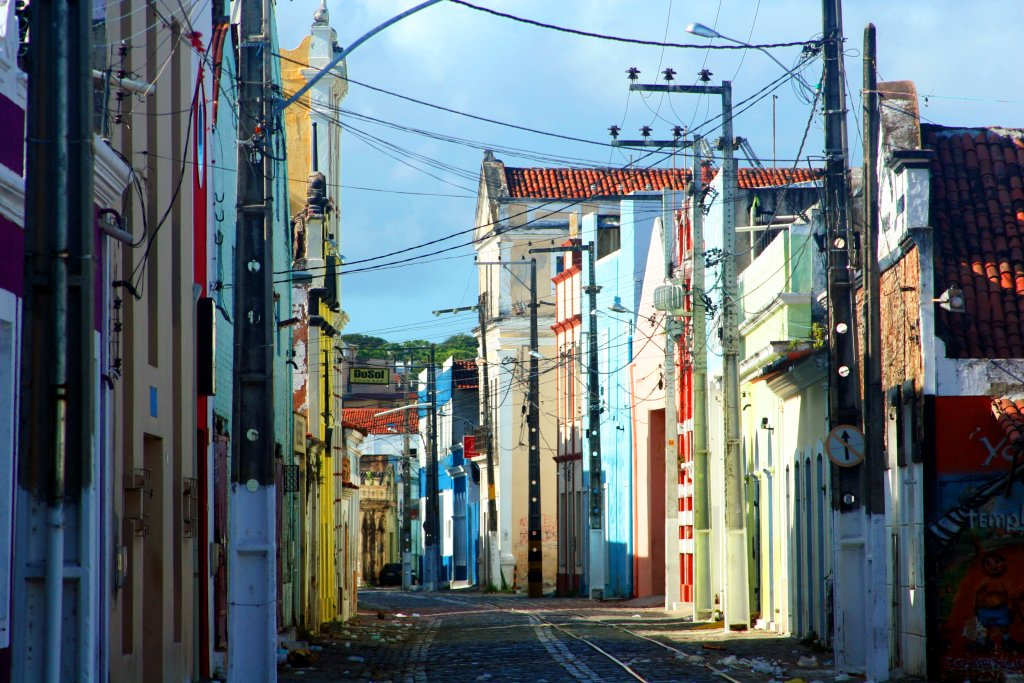
Chile Street, one of the city's first roads.

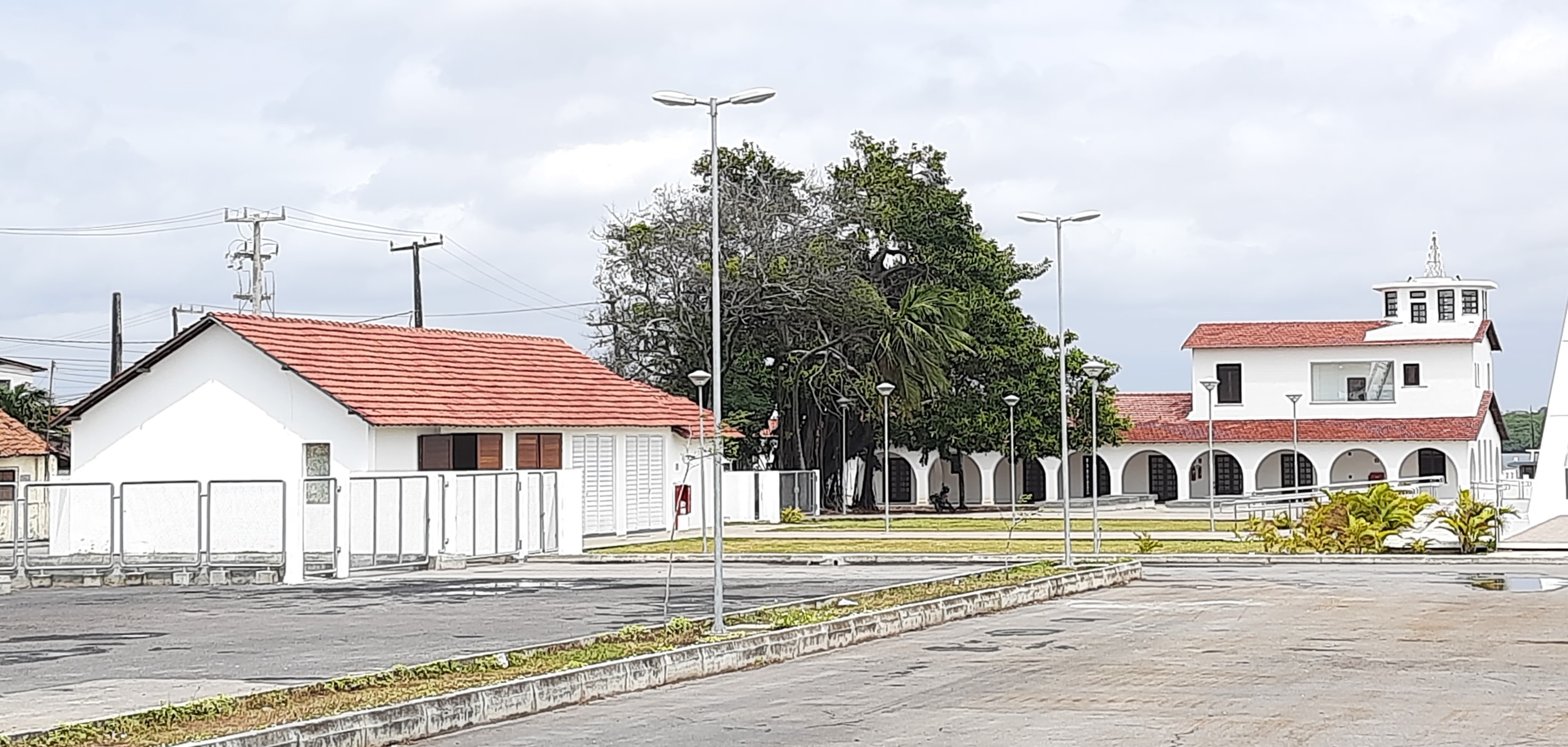
Rampa, the first base to operate war missions in South America.

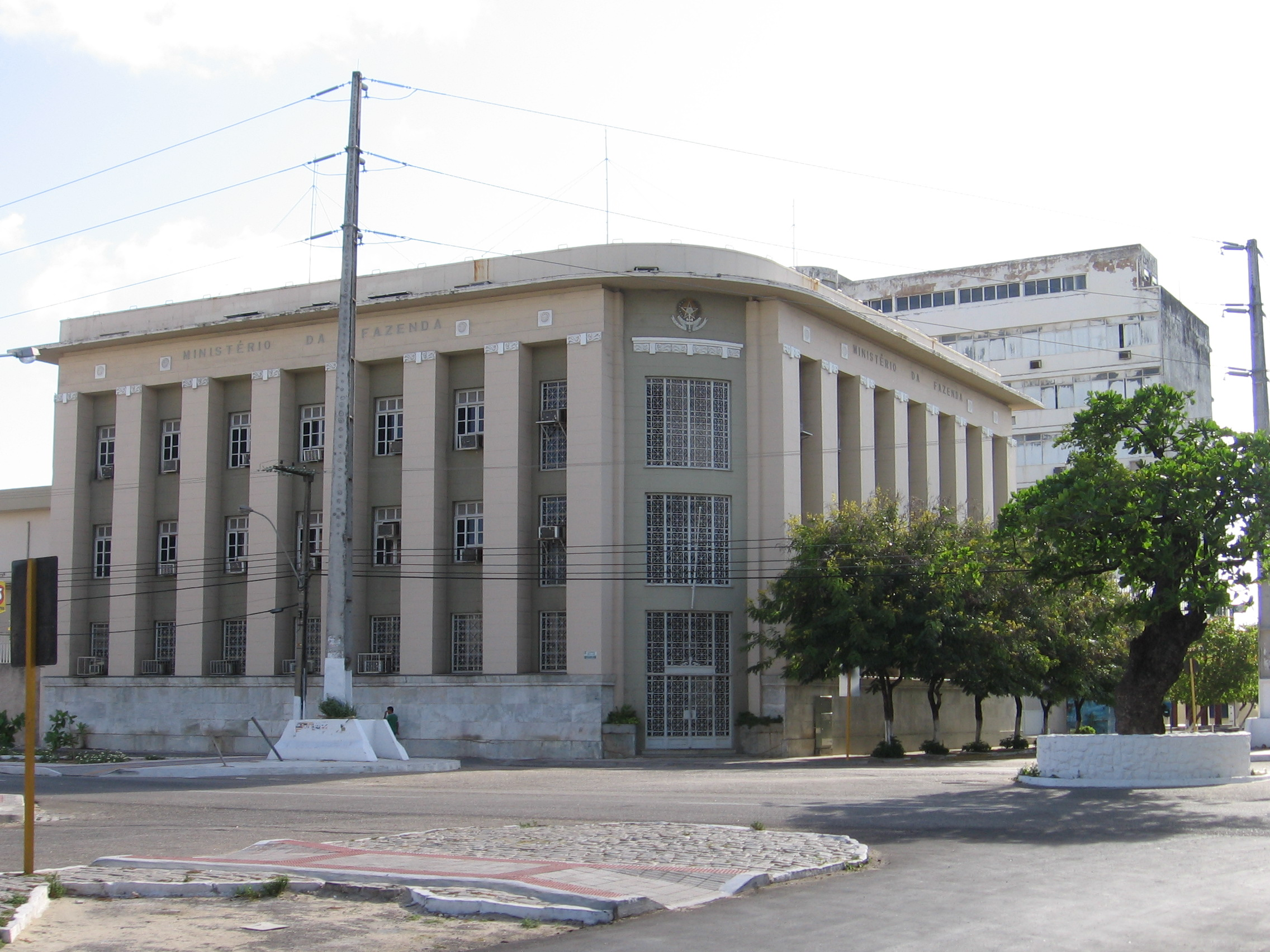
Ministry of Finance in Natal.

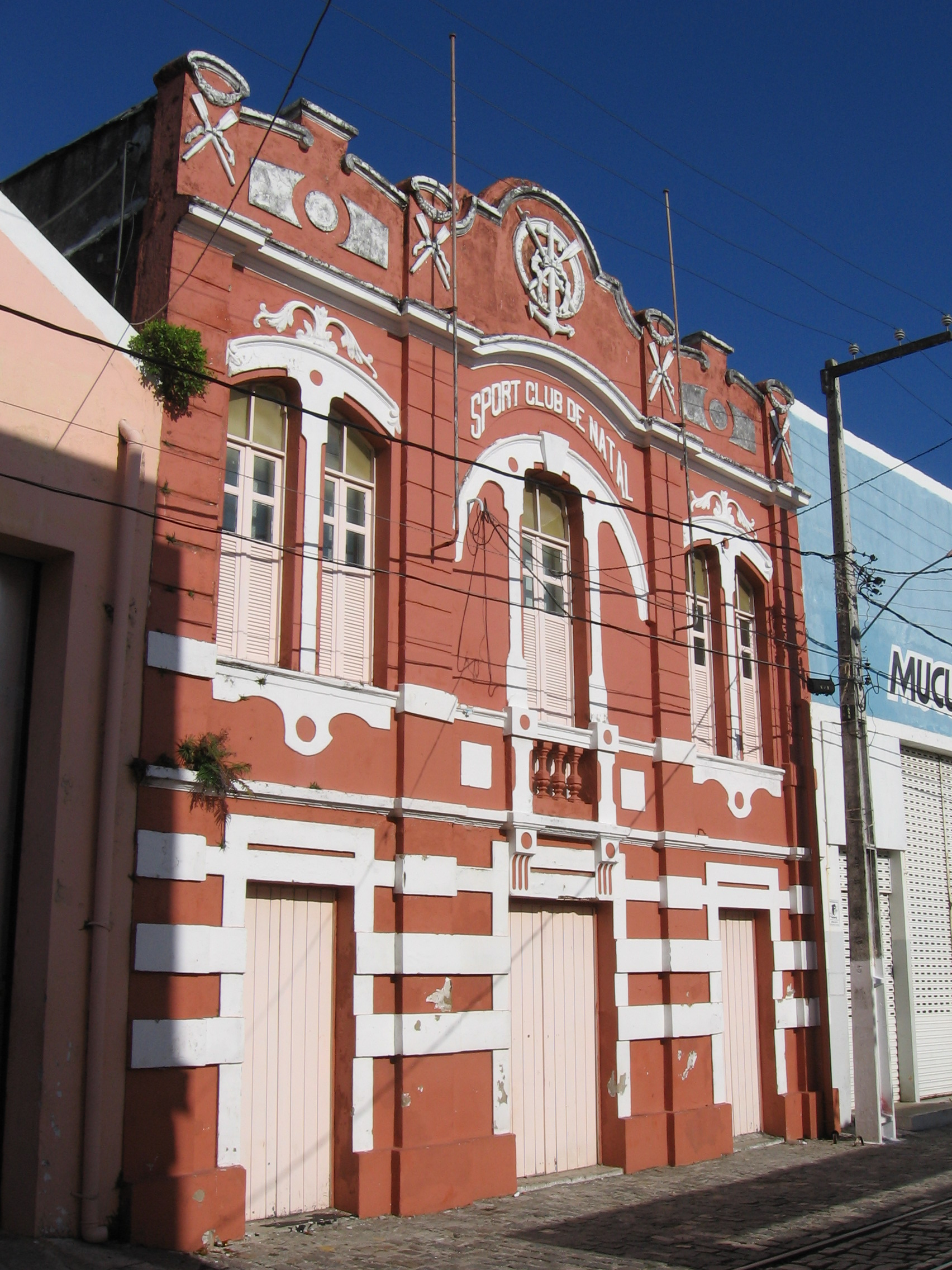
Sport Club of Natal.

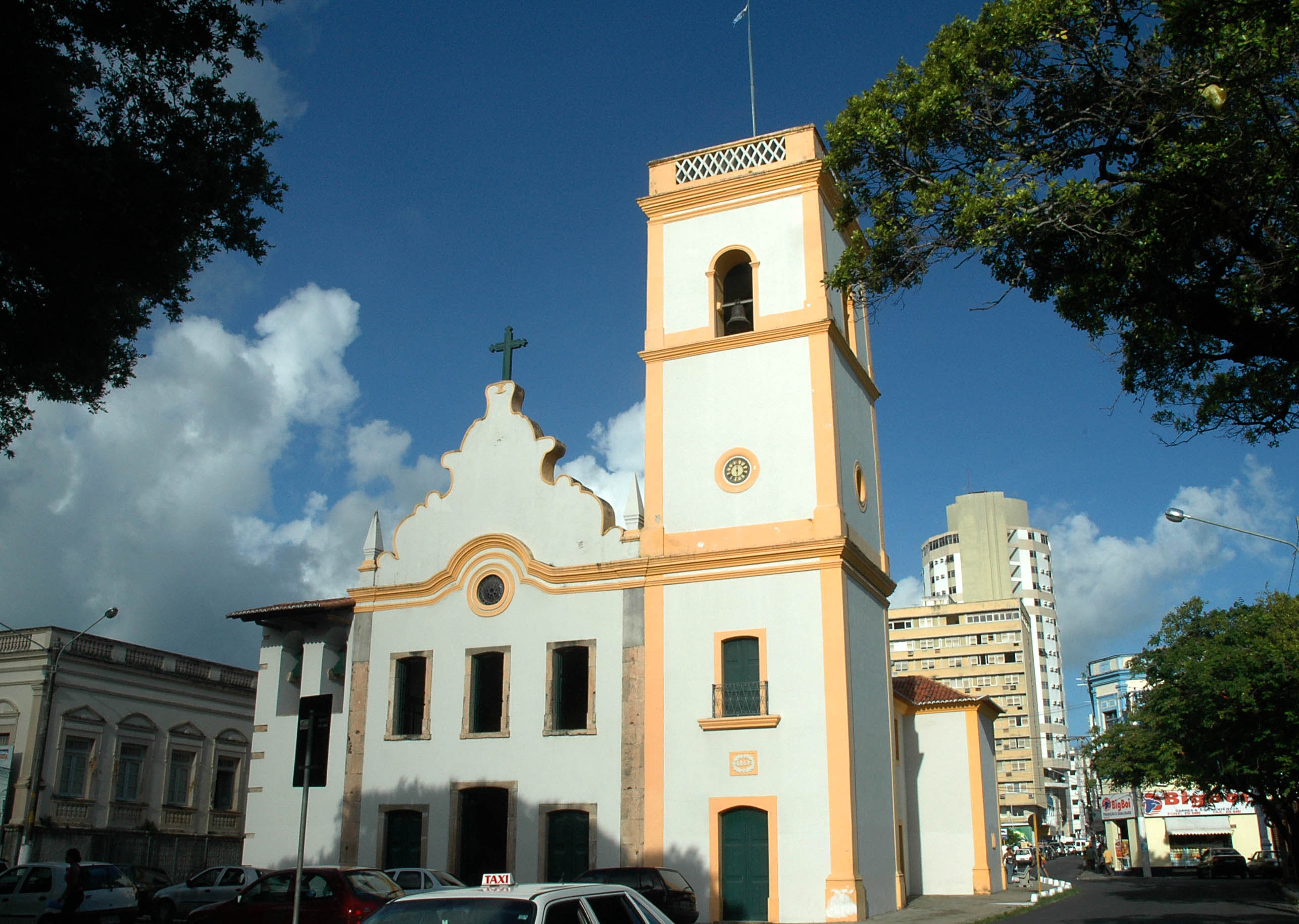
Mother Church of Our Lady of the Presentation (Old Metropolitan Cathedral), the first church in the state.

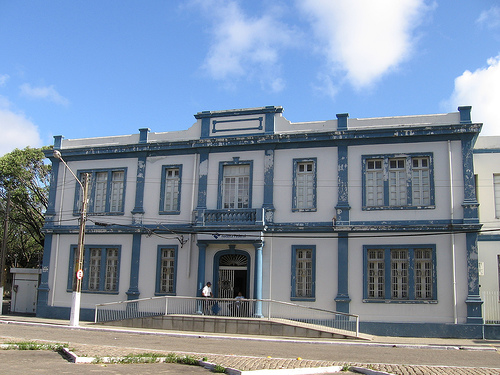
Federal Revenue Office.

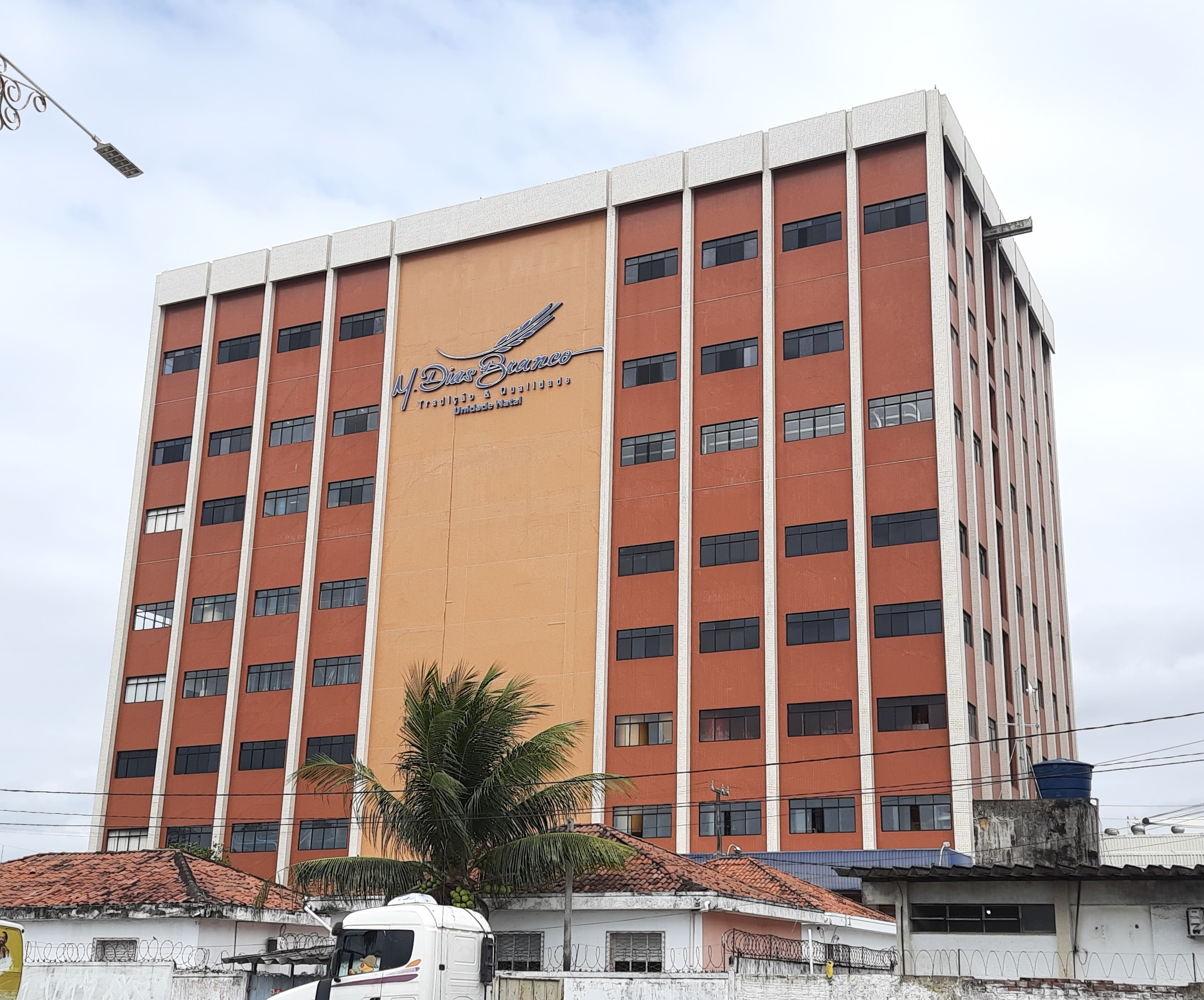
Grande Moinho Potiguar, a subsidiary of M. Dias Branco.

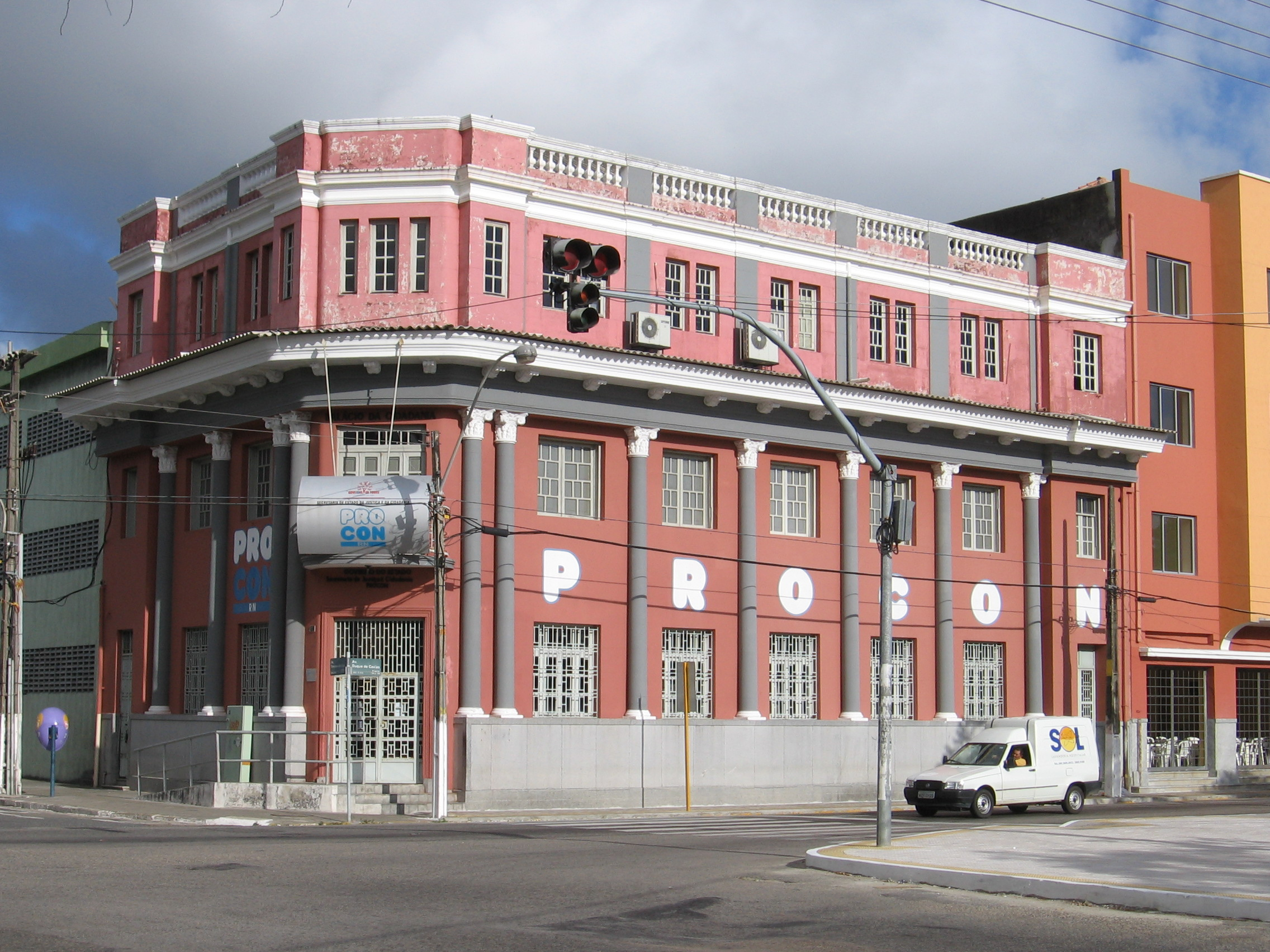
State Procon Headquarters.

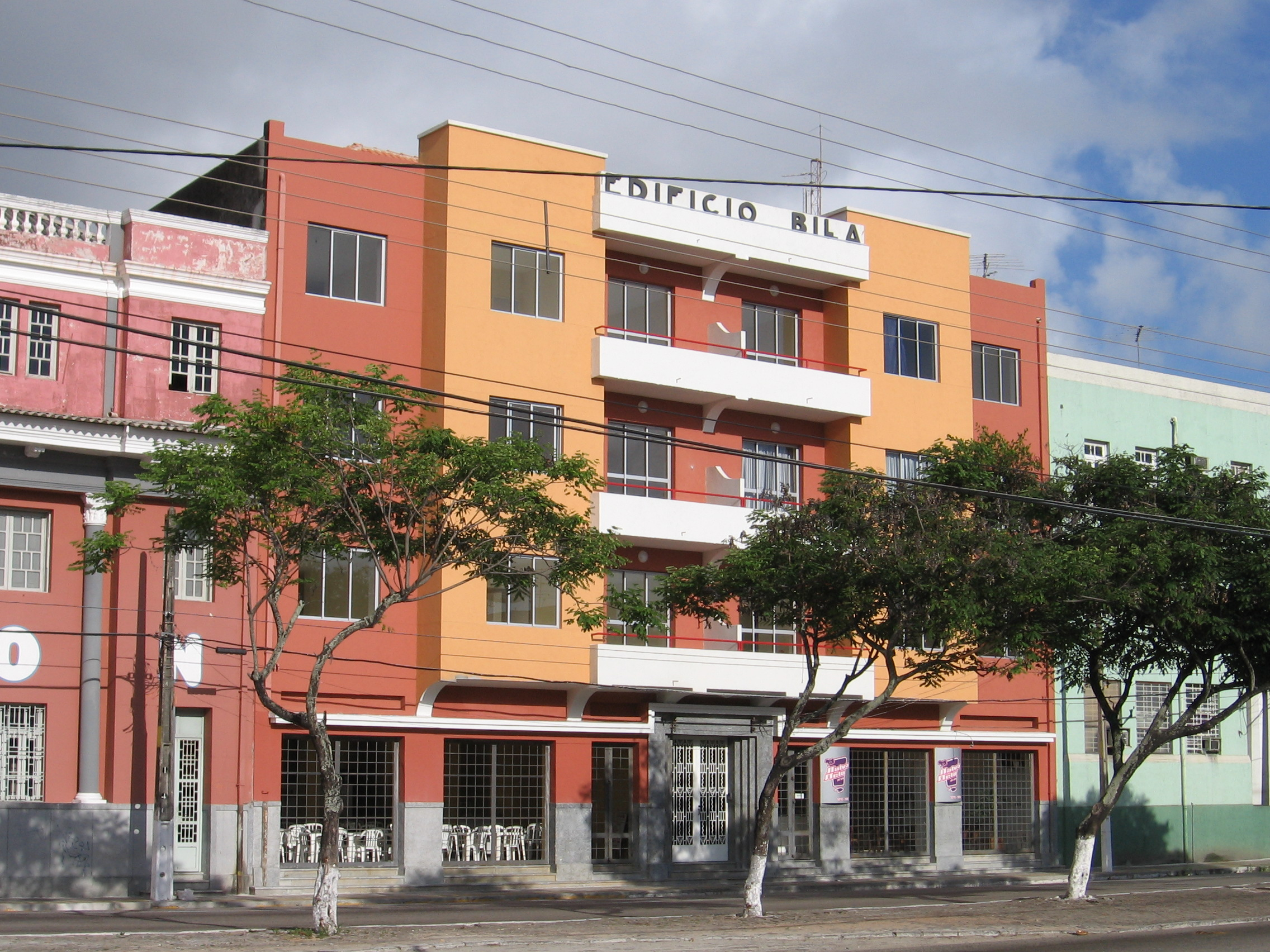
Bila Building.

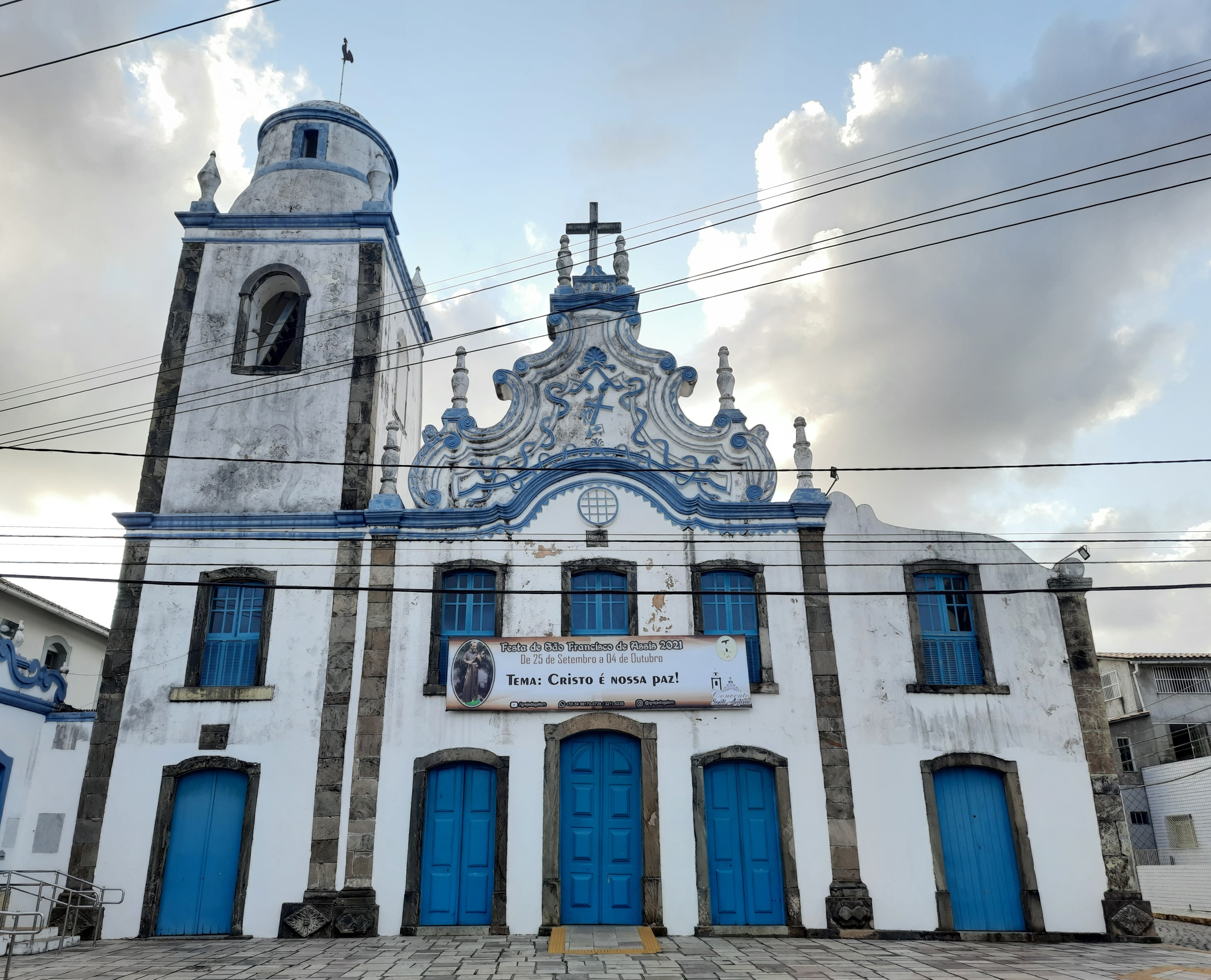
Church of St. Anthony.

== See also ==
- History of Rio Grande do Norte
