= Our Lady of Presentation =

Here is the list of Our lady of Presentation Churches around the world.

== Asia ==
=== India ===
- Our Lady of Presentation Church, Mathapuram, Tamilnadu

=== Srilanka ===
- Church of Our Lady of Presentation, Batticaloa, Maṭṭakkaḷappu, Eastern Province

== South America ==
=== Brazil ===
- Our Lady of the Presentation Cathedral, Natal, Rio Grande do Norte

=== External links ===
- Site of the Archdiocese of Natal (in Portuguese)
- Site about Our Lady of Presentation (in Portuguese)
- Letter of the Anthem of Our Lady of Presentation in the Portuguese Wikisource (in Portuguese)
