= Our Lady of the Presentation Cathedral, Natal =

Our Lady of the Presentation Cathedral
- Catedral Metropolitana Nossa Senhora da Apresentação
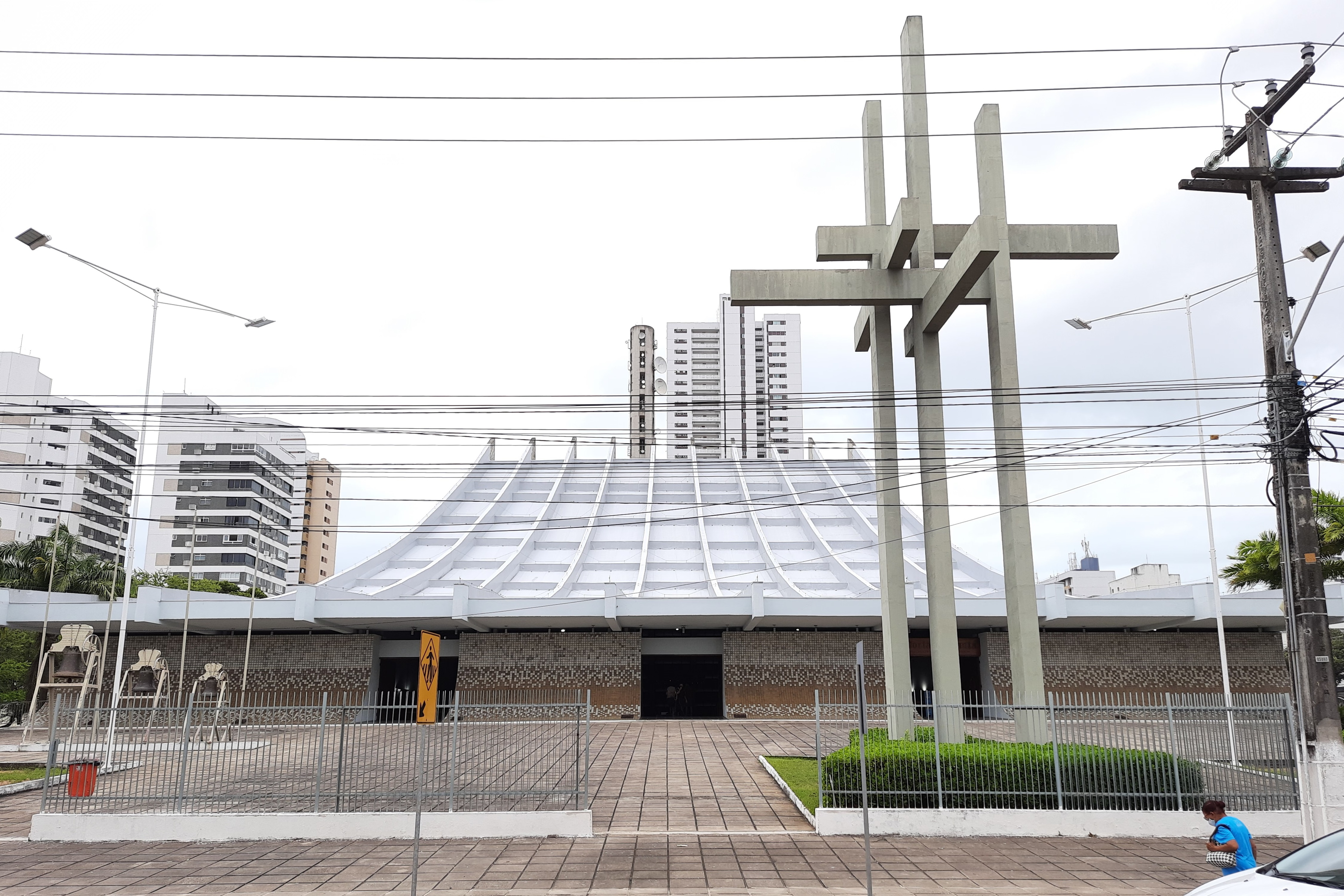
- Our Lady of the Presentation Cathedral
- 5.7920°S 35.2060°W
- Location: Natal
- Country: Brazil
- Denomination: Roman Catholic Church

Administration
- Archdiocese: Natal

The Our Lady of the Presentation Cathedral (Portuguese: Catedral Metropolitana Nossa Senhora da Apresentação) Also Natal Cathedral It is a religious building of the Catholic Church dedicated to Our Lady of the Presentation, in Natal, Brazil.

It was inaugurated on November 21, 1988, and is located in the district of Cidade Alta in Natal, capital of the Brazilian state of Rio Grande do Norte. It has a style of construction with ascending lines in trapezoidal form quite peculiar.

In the basement of the building, there is the Pío X Pastoral Center, where the Archbishop's Office, the Metropolitan Curia, the Cathedral Parish, and the coordination of various Christian pastoral offices are located.

On the occasion of his third visit to Brazil, the cathedral received Pope John Paul II on October 13, 1991.

== See also ==
- Roman Catholicism in Brazil
- Our Lady of the Presentation
