= History of Rio Grande do Norte =

Historical background of the Brazilian state of Rio Grande do Norte

Location of Rio Grande do Norte in Brazil.

The history of Rio Grande do Norte begins with the settlement of the Brazilian territory, when a flood of migrations of primitive people (hunter-gatherer nomads) headed to the Andes, then to the Brazilian Plateau, to the Northeast region, until they reached the place that is now Rio Grande do Norte. Throughout history, its territory suffered invasions by foreign peoples, mainly the French and the Dutch. After being subordinated to the general government of the State of Brazil, Rio Grande do Norte became subordinated to the Captaincy of Pernambuco. In 1822, when Brazil conquered its independence from the Portuguese Empire, Rio Grande do Norte would become a province and, after the fall of the monarchy and the consequent proclamation of the republic, the province became a state, with Pedro de Albuquerque Maranhão as the first governor.

== Prehistory and pre-colonial period ==
Initially the territory of Rio Grande do Norte began to be populated by hunter-gatherer peoples, who would later have left traces that are currently found in the archeological sites of Angicos and Mutamba II. Among the studies about archeology of the Rio Grande do Norte, most were done by the Câmara Cascudo Museum, with A. F. G. Laroche as its main researcher. According to him, the current states of Pernambuco and Rio Grande do Norte were the most important contributors to the history of the Northeast region; other research showed different results. Professor Paulo Tadeu de Souza Albuquerque, head of the archeological coordination at the Federal University of Rio Grande do Norte, participated in excavations made around the site of the Fortress of the Three Wise Men and the old metropolitan cathedral of Natal, where the main result found was the tomb of André de Albuquerque Maranhão.

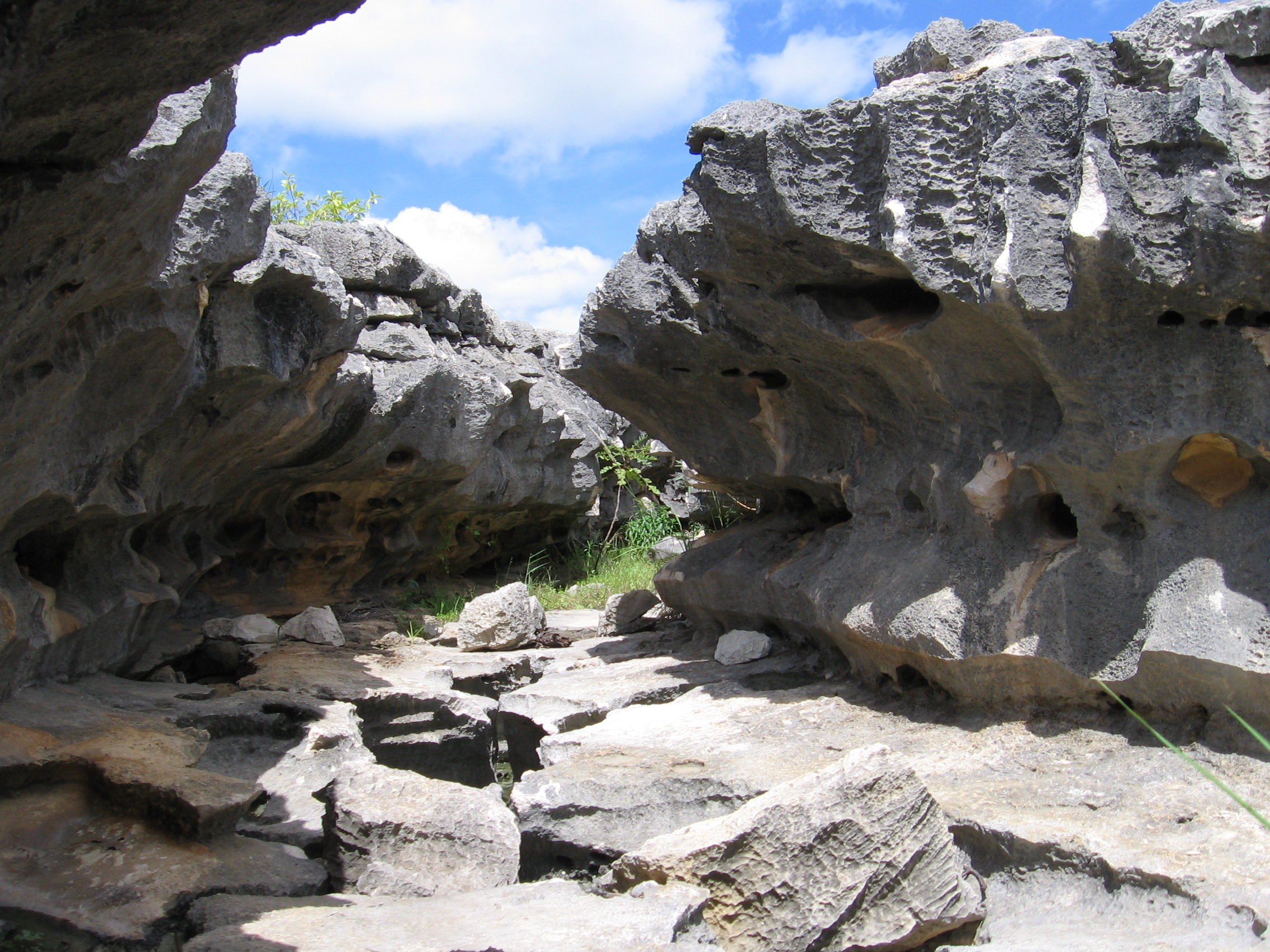
Vale in the region of Ravina do Peninha in Lajedo de Soledade, Apodi.

The primitive peoples in Rio Grande do Norte left traces scattered throughout the territory. Some sites present incised rock inscriptions, like the one discovered in Serra Negra do Norte, at the Umburana farm. In other places, incised inscriptions followed by paintings are found, such as in the Lajedo de Soledade, in Apodi. The meaning of these rock inscriptions is still debated; the most accepted one states that those inscriptions and drawings had as main purpose to convey a message, as a communication tool, using a kind of writing different from the current one.

At the time of Brazil's discovery the territory was inhabited by Tupi people from Paraná and Paraguay who speak the abanheenga language, a dialect with verbal reflections, and by the Tapuias, in the interior of the state. The main inhabited areas correspond today to the regions of the Seridó, Chapada do Apodi, and the highlands of Rio Grande do Norte.

The place where the fleet commanded by Cabral would have landed is still a subject of controversy, and one of the scenarios defended by some researchers states that the expedition would have landed for the first time on the beach of Touros, where the coast of Rio Grande do Norte forms the 90° angle between the northern and eastern directions, which gives the state its nickname of "corner of the continent".

== Colonial period ==
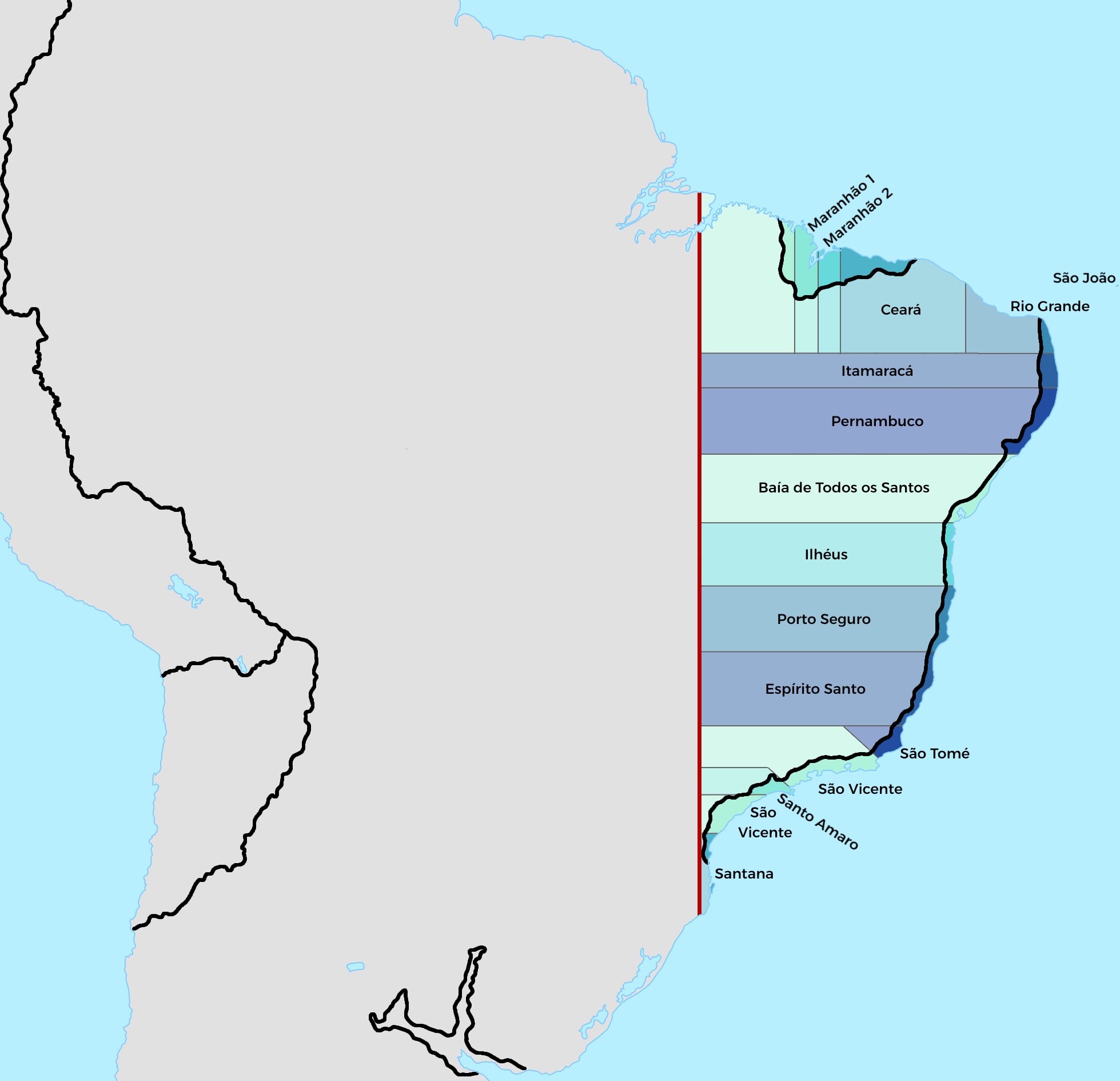
Captaincies of Brazil in 1534.

According to historians, the first organized expedition into the territory of Rio Grande do Norte would have taken place in 1501. It is not known exactly who was the commander of this expedition, which lasted 67 days; however, among several names given, the most accepted is Gaspar de Lemos. The result of this expedition was the arrival at Cape São Roque, where, according to historian Luís da Câmara Cascudo, occurred the establishment of Brazil's first landmark. In the same period, the Portuguese Crown took the decision to send military personnel to carry out expeditions (called Guarda-costas) for the defense of its colony, since the Brazilian coast was being invaded by privateers, mainly from France.

Among the military expeditions that took place, those commanded by the Portuguese Cristóvão Jacques (1516–1519 and 1526–1528), a native of Algarves, are considered the most important. To solve the problem of the privateers, Cristóvão suggested that the place be immediately populated, an idea approved by eminent people in Portugal. Then, the king of Portugal at the time, John III, sent an expedition led by Martim Afonso de Sousa to Brazil. Besides the idea of settlement, Martim also suggested the territorial division of Brazil into Hereditary Captaincies, which had already been done in islands located in the Atlantic Ocean. This idea was also approved and implemented. In 1535, the then captaincy of Rio Grande would be donated by King John III to João de Barros. Initially, colonization failed and the French continued the smuggling of brazilwood, dominating the area until 1598.

The French settled on the coast of Rio Grande do Norte, but without the purpose of dominating the native population, which made them allies. Due to its strategic location, King Philip II became interested in the captaincy of Rio Grande. However, the permanence of the French in the territory was still an aggravating situation. For this reason, two Royal Letters, the first in 1596 and the second in 1597, determined the French expulsion, besides the construction of a fort and the foundation of a city, which would become Natal, on 25 December 1599. There is a struggle among historians in Rio Grande do Norte to reconstitute this event, since the documents about the foundation history of the capital of the state were destroyed during the Dutch invasion.

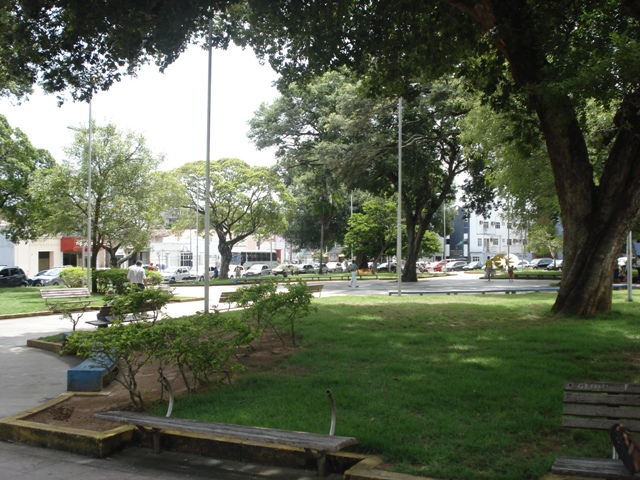
André de Albuquerque Square. This was the place where, according to historians, a mass was celebrated after the founding of Natal.

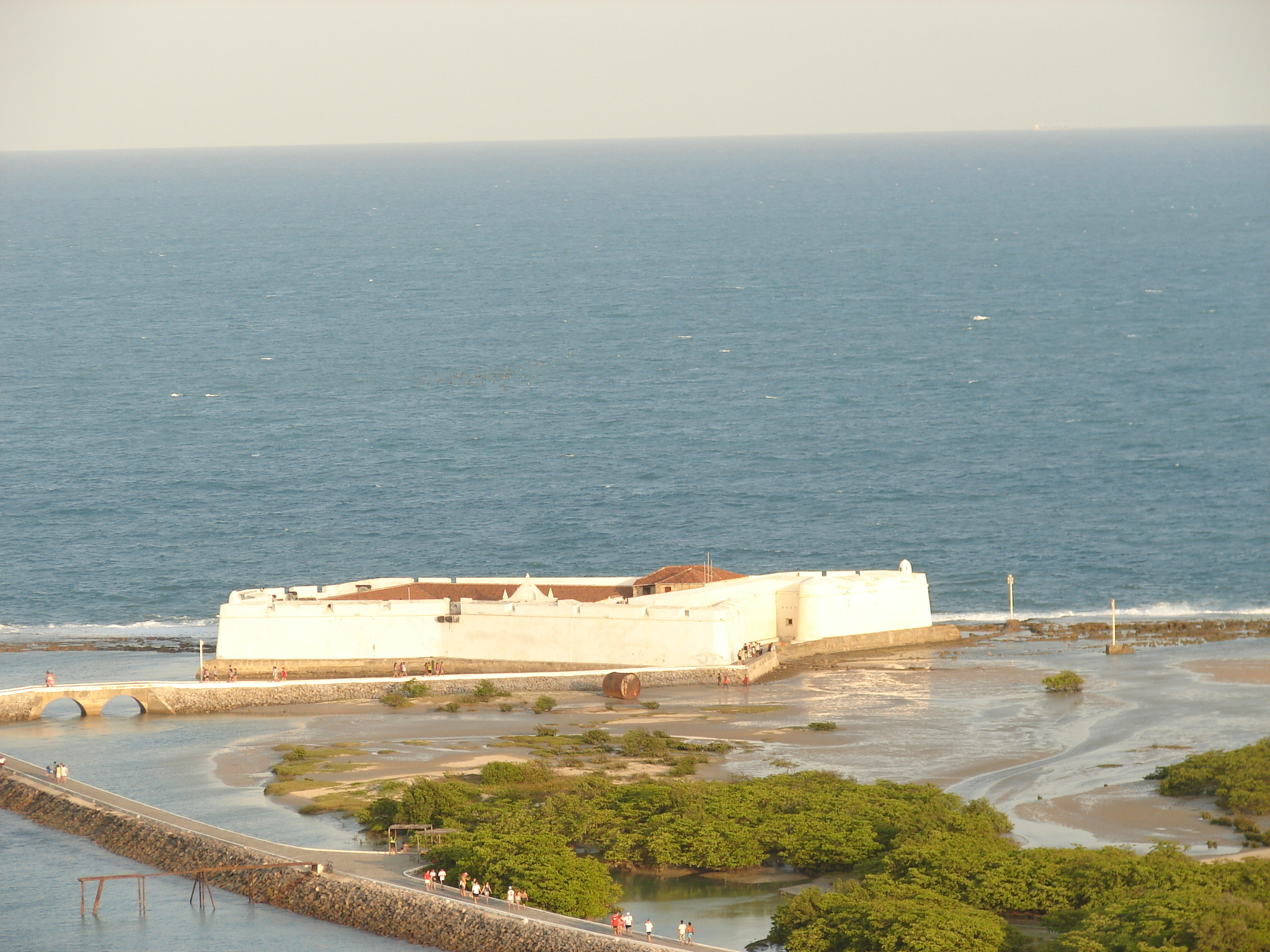
Fortress of the Three Wise Men, where, according to historians, was the first administrative headquarters of the Captaincy of Rio Grande do Norte.

One of the versions states that Natal was founded after Manuel Mascarenhas Homem appointed Jerônimo de Albuquerque as commander of the fortress, who would then go to Bahia to report on his mission. Further research has proven that Mascarenhas did not appoint Jerônimo to the position of captain-major of Rio Grande and that he was not present on the date of the city's founding, and therefore cannot be considered the founder of Natal. Another accepted hypothesis states that Natal was founded by João Rodrigues Colaço, and after the foundation, a mass would have been celebrated in the place that corresponds to the current André de Albuquerque Square.

The phase of the history of Rio Grande do Norte between the foundation of Natal and the Dutch invasion is, according to historian Tavares de Lyra, considered to be one of the most obscure phases, due to the fact that all historical archives narrating facts prior to the Dutch conquest in Brazil were destroyed during the invasion period. Furthermore, there are still doubts about who would have been the first captain-major of Rio Grande do Norte. However, it is known that the Fortress of the Three Wise Men was the first administrative headquarters of the Captaincy of Rio Grande do Norte.

The Dutch, knowing the strategic importance of that military building, began to gather as much information as possible to elaborate an effective plan to conquer it. In 1625, Captain Uzel Johannes de Laet made a reconnaissance, finding a mill and a lot of cattle breeding in the territory. Five years later, according to notorious historian Luís da Câmara Cascudo, Adriano Verbo came to the captaincy with the "special mission of seeing, hearing and singing". Nevertheless, the Dutch tried to take possession of this fortress. In 1631, the native Marcial surrendered to the Political Council of the Brazilian Dutch, to form alliances with the Batavians. The latter, in turn, organized an expedition, where they obtained several important pieces of information that were in the possession of the Portuguese and that would later facilitate the conquest of Ceará. These documents were with a Portuguese man named João Pereira, who was killed later.

Some time later, the Dutch finally imposed their plan to conquer Rio Grande do Norte. Historian Câmara Cascudo states that "On December 21, 1631, fourteen ships set sail from Recife, with ten companies of veteran soldiers. Servaes Carpenter and Van Der Haghen, advisors to the Company, assumed the supreme direction. The troops were commanded by Lieutenant Colonel Hartman Godefrid Van Steyn-Gallefels. They agreed to land at Ponta Negra, three leagues south of Natal, marching on the city". However, captain-major Cipriano Pita Carneiro ordered his followers to open fire on the invaders, which led the Dutch to give up the conquest. For this reason, it is said that their first attempt to conquer resulted in failure. In fact, the conquering of the territory of Rio Grande do Norte was an extremely arduous and difficult task.

Later, the Dutch tried again to conquer the territory, facing strong resistance from the defenders of the Fortress of the Three Wise Men. According to different versions, the Netherlands was interested in conquering Rio Grande do Norte because it was the definitive solution for the supply of beef to the Batavians. The fortress had Pero Mendes de Gouveia as its captain-major, plus a staff of only eighty men. However, the captain-major decided to abandon the dunes located near the fortress, contributing to the installation of artillery there by his enemies, making the building a target for real attacks. And that is exactly what happened: the Fortress of the Three Wise Men was destroyed and the Dutch dominance in Rio Grande do Norte was consolidated.

Dutch rule generated discontent for some of the settlers, mainly due to the harsh regime that was imposed by the West India Company, especially under the administration of Maurice of Nassau. Portugal pressured the Netherlands more and more to give back its colonies, but the Dutch did not agree, which created a great deal of hostility between the two empires.

In 1645, one of the most historic events in Rio Grande do Norte took place: the martyrdom of Cunhaú and Uruaçu, which occurred when the Janduí people and more than two hundred Dutchmen, commanded by Jacob Rabi, delegate of Count Maurício de Nassau, cruelly killed about seventy believers and Fathers André de Soveral and Ambrósio Francisco Ferro. At the time of the death, the faithful were attending a mass that was being celebrated in the Chapel of Our Lady of Candeias, located in the Cunhaú mill, a few kilometers from Barra do Cunhaú. At the time, this mill was the center of the local economy, still quite primitive. Only three people managed to escape the massacre.

Since 1598, the executive power had been exercised by a captain-major, who was a chief appointed by means of a document called Carta-Patente. During the period of the invasion, this system had been extinguished and reappointed after the expulsion of the Dutch. With the exception of João Rodrigues Colaço, who had been appointed by the governor-general of Brazil at the time and confirmed in office by a later royal charter, all the other captains-major were appointed by means of this charter. Throughout history, the position received several denominations, such as Captain-Major of Rio Grande (1739) and Captain-Major of Rio Grande do Norte, to differentiate it from another captaincy located in the far south of the colony. In addition to the executive position, there was also the post of financial administrator, responsible for collecting the taxes. From 1770 on, due to the death of the acting captain-major, the position was replaced by a junta. At the time, the captaincy was formed by only one municipality: Natal. Later, others emerged, such as São José do Mipibu and Vila Flor. The judiciary, on the other hand, had an ombudsman as its highest representative, previously appointed by the captains of the captaincies and later by the king himself.

On 11 January 1701, Rio Grande do Norte became subordinate to Pernambuco and, later, to Paraíba, and became emancipated on 18 March 1818, through a Royal Charter. The first administrator was José Inácio Borges, who was deposed in December 1821. With the deposition, a junta assumed power until new elections were called. In 1822, Brazil would finally gain independence from Portuguese rule after three centuries and Rio Grande do Norte would become a province, but the news would take three months to arrive.

== Post-Independence Period ==
=== Imperial Period ===
On 7 September 1822, Brazil became independent from Portugal and the following year Emperor Pedro I dissolved the Constituent Assembly, which had been formed to draft the first imperial constitution. This caused an internal issue in Pernambuco, which led to the explosion of the Confederation of the Equator, a movement where imperial troops were sent to the state with support from other provinces, such as Alagoas, Ceará, Paraíba, Piauí and Rio Grande do Norte, spreading throughout the region. In the province of Rio Grande do Norte, the movement was marked by the actions of Tomás de Araújo Pereira, to avoid the occurrence of armed conflicts in the territory. In the end, the movement was unsuccessful. One of its main leaders, priest Joaquim do Amor Divino Rabelo, known as Frei Caneca, was persecuted, tried, and sentenced to death. On 1 December of that year, the Emperor granted the Constitution of 1824 and the Northeast and North regions of Brazil had the imperial order restored.

In 1831, Emperor Pedro I decided to abdicate the Brazilian throne in favor of his son Pedro de Alcantara. After the abdication, Pedro I returned to Portugal and held the Portuguese crown for three years. However, his son, who remained in Brazil, was only five years old at the time. As a result, the regency period began, which governed the country until Pedro de Alcântara reached the age of majority. In 1840, with the Majority Coup, Dom Pedro II had his legal majority anticipated and took power when he was only fourteen years old. In Rio Grande do Norte, the first adherence to republican ideas occurred five years before Brazil's independence, in 1817, whose main signatories were farmers, merchants, and sugar mill owners. The reaction to this movement in the province was represented by two parties: Liberal and Conservative. The internal divergences were very strong, which contributed to facilitate the development of the campaign for the replacement of the monarchic regime by the republican one in the country. It is considered that the official beginning of the republican publicity in the province of Rio Grande do Norte would have occurred in 1851, with the publication of a newspaper directed by Manuel Brandão, called Jaguarari. Between 1857 and 1875, with the participation of Joaquim Teodoro Cisneiro de Albuquerque, the campaign continued and the movement became more organized. In 1886, a republican nucleus was formed in Caicó by Januncio Nóbrega and Manuel Sabino da Costa, intensifying more and more the republican scenario. Three years later, on 27 January 1889, the Republican Party was founded in Rio Grande do Norte, with the special participation of Pedro de Albuquerque Maranhão, known as Pedro Velho, later leader of the campaign. After the party was founded, the newspaper A República was created and became the official organ of the party.

Still during the Empire, slavery, predominant in Brazil, also existed in Rio Grande do Norte. To fight for the end of the slave labor regime, an abolitionist movement occurred throughout the country, which, in Rio Grande do Norte, was defended by intellectual groups of young people. For many, this was a republican idea that represented a new era. Only on 13 May 1888, with the signing of the Golden Law, slavery was definitively extinguished. Mossoró, in the western region, was the second Brazilian city to abolish slavery, on 29 September 1883, a little more than four years before the signature of the Golden Law.

=== Old Republic ===
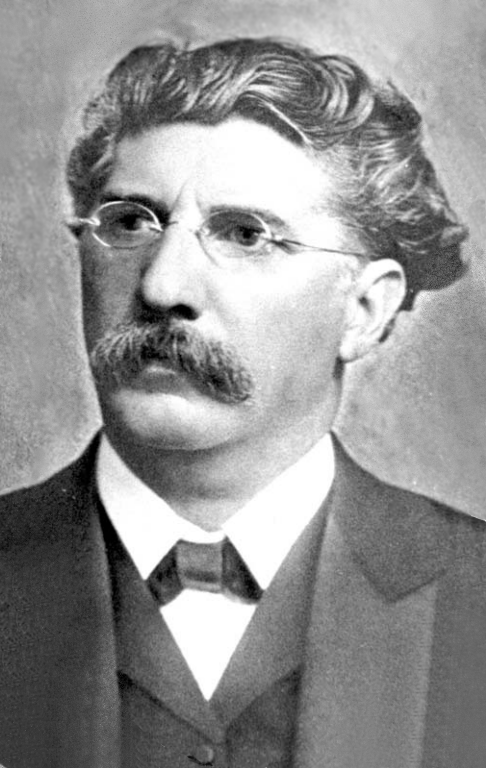
Pedro Velho, first governor of Rio Grande do Norte after the proclamation of the republic.

It was only on 15 November 1889 that the republic was proclaimed in Brazil, without the slightest involvement of the Brazilian population, since it was a movement promoted exclusively by sectors of the elite and the army. Rio Grande do Norte, as well as the other provinces, became states. There, the victory of the Republican campaign was only confirmed the next day, when José Leão Ferreira Souto signed a telegram destined for the Republican Party. On 17 November 1889, Pedro Velho took office as the first governor of the state, remaining in office from 17 November to 6 December 1889. In 1892, he was elected federal deputy for Rio Grande do Norte.

In the new republican regime, Rio Grande do Norte, like the other states in Brazil, was dominated by the oligarchic system, with the first one being inaugurated in the state by governor Pedro Velho. In opposition to this regime, emerged Captain José da Penha Alves de Souza, who was responsible for promoting the first popular campaign in the state. He even tried to launch the candidacy of a person who did not know Rio Grande do Norte and had no desire to govern it: Lieutenant Leônidas Hermes da Fonseca, son of the president of the Republic at the time. For this reason, José da Penha went to live in Ceará, where he was elected as a state deputy.

At the end of the 18th century, the states of Ceará and Rio Grande do Norte still did not have their borders defined. The cities of Assu and Mossoró, by founding their first charqueadas, became rivals of the Ceará workshops. Therefore, measures were taken to put an end to the charqueadas in Rio Grande do Norte, such as closing the ports of Mossoró and Assu, which at the time had a coastline. At the same time, Ceará needed the salt produced in the salt pans of Rio Grande do Norte to be able to produce the carne-de-sol. The City Council of Aracati, in Ceará, intended to go beyond the borders of its state, penetrating the lands of Rio Grande do Norte. In 1901, the State Assembly of Ceará elevated Grossos (in Rio Grande do Norte) to the status of village. Then, Pedro Augusto Borges, who was governor of Ceará at the time, sanctioned the resolution. The state governor, Alberto Maranhão, protested against this measure, which led to the governments of the two states reacting and sending troops to the disputed region. However, common sense prevailed and an armed conflict was avoided. The controversy was taken to arbitration, and the final result was favorable to Ceará. Pedro Velho invited Rui Barbosa to defend the cause of Rio Grande do Norte, with the participation of Augusto Tavares de Lira and, in the end, the jurist Augusto Petronio, by means of three judgments, definitely granted the cause to Rio Grande do Norte, putting an end to the Question of Grossos.

Since independence, the state's economy, as well as the country's, had an insignificant industrial sector. In the regional context, Rio Grande do Norte only had more industries than Piauí and Maranhão. In this sector, the textile and food industries were the most predominant. As for the financial system, it was only in 1909 that the first banking system appeared, located in the capital. The first branch of Banco do Brasil in the state was only inaugurated on 14 April 1917, thanks to the initiatives of Juvenal Lamartine. At that time, almost the entire northeastern region already had branches. In addition, there was the creation of rural banks in some municipalities in the interior of the state. To facilitate access to credit, Ulisses de Góis and Jovino dos Anjos were responsible for the appearance of cooperatives. In the mid-1920s, the economic axis of Rio Grande do Norte, which was restricted only to the coast, moved to the interior, initiating the second oligarchic phase in the state, inaugurated by José Augusto Bezerra de Medeiros, which was only interrupted with the Revolution of 1930.

During the government of president Artur Bernardes, between 1922 and 1926, the Prestes Column began, led by Luís Carlos Prestes and Miguel Costa, which covered some 25 thousand kilometers over a large part of the national territory. The Column arrived in Rio Grande do Norte during the government of José Augusto Bezerra de Medeiros, who immediately ordered the reinforcement of security in the state. In 1926, the first contingent of military police headed to the west of the state, where almost all of the fighting took place. The Seridó region, which also ran the risk of being invaded, put its police forces on alert. Only a while later, the Prestes Column left Rio Grande do Norte, through the municipality of Luís Gomes. This was the last event of the Old Republic that had repercussions in the state.

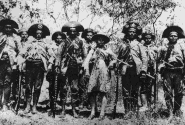
Lampião and his gang in Mossoró, in 1927.

On 10 June 1927, the most famous cangaceiro of the Northeast region, Virgulino Ferreira da Silva, popularly known as Lampião, arrived in Rio Grande do Norte, entering the state through the town of Luís Gomes. The gang traveled through several cities in the western region of the state, leaving several trails of destruction on their way to Mossoró. In Apodi, part of the gang tried to attack the city, but the population was already prepared. As they approached Apodi, Juventino Cabral ordered them to set fire to the city, but the robbers preferred not to risk it and continued on their way. In Dix-Sept Rosado (a district of Mossoró at the time), Lampião and his gang committed several acts considered vandalism. It is believed that this attack by Lampião was idealized by Massilon Leite Benevides, a cangaceiro from the north of Rio Grande do Sul, who was very familiar with the west of the state. According to Aglae Lima de Oliveira, the objective of this invasion was "to plunder the installations of the Banco do Brasil, the industry, the commerce, and the residences, in order to obtain a good harvest" and receive an expressive amount of réis, Brazil's currency at the time. However, few people believed that Lampião would attack the city. The mayor at the time, Rodolfo Fernandes, believed in this possibility and was absolutely aware of the critical situation of the city. The state government sent Lieutenant Laurentino de Morais to Mossoró, where it was found that the city's police force was very small, with only 22 soldiers; therefore, measures should be taken urgently. On 12 June, Rodolfo Fernandes held a meeting to warn the population about the attack, but the population still didn't believe in such a possibility. A few hours later, church bells began to ring, and the population finally became aware of the attack, causing panic to grip the city. Some people fled, while others were unable to act. To try to contain the invaders, several trenches were set up. The next day, when Lampião and his gang arrived at Sítio Saco, the cangaceiro received a note offering a total of 400 réis in cash to spare the city of Mossoró. Lampião denied it, and later received a second threatening note. In the afternoon, Lampião divided his gang into three different groups: the first group would attack the mayor's house, the second group would attack the Mossoró railroad station, while the third group had the task of attacking the cemetery. An hour later, the gang retreated, leaving Colchete and Jararaca behind. The latter was wounded in the chest and killed three days after his arrest; he is buried in the same cemetery that had been invaded by Lampião's gang.

=== From the Vargas Era to the present day ===
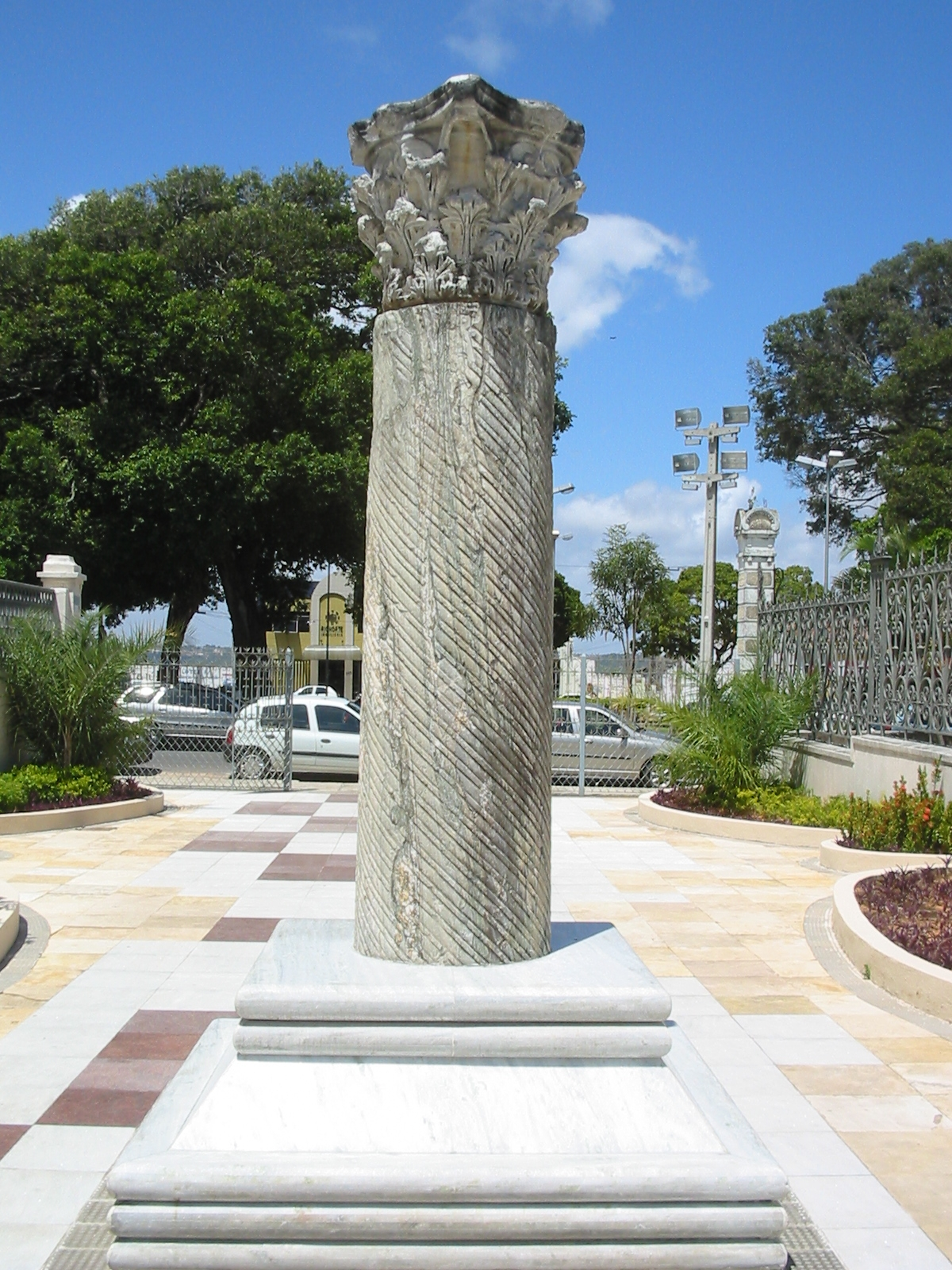
The Capitoline Column, donated by Benito Mussolini to Natal.

In 1930, a revolutionary movement broke out, ending the Old Republic, which occurred mainly for reasons of political-economic origin, such as the fraud in the elections to choose the president of the Republic and the assassination of João Pessoa Cavalcanti de Albuquerque in Recife. After the movement, Júlio Prestes, victorious candidate in the elections for president, was prevented from taking office and Getúlio Vargas assumed power, where he remained president for fifteen years. During the revolution, Rio Grande do Norte was governed by Juvenal Lamartine, whose administration was characterized by dependence on the federal government and a lack of tolerance in fighting his opponents. Café Filho, the main character of the 1930 Revolution in Rio Grande do Norte, who was later persecuted and fled to Paraíba, emerged. There, he was part of a movement idealized by the Liberal Alliance, which defended Getúlio Vargas as president and João Pessoa as vice-president, opposition candidates to the government of the time. In Rio Grande do Norte, these candidates were defeated. It is believed that Governor Juvenal Lamartine's support for São Paulo's Julio Prestes contributed to this loss. On 5 October 1930, Juvenal abandoned Rio Grande do Norte, and a governing junta formed by three people (Luís Tavares Guerreiro, Abelardo Torres da Silva, and Júlio Perouse Pontes), which remained in power for a week, took his place.

On 1 January 1931, the Italian ship Lazeroto Malocello, commanded by the frigate captain Carlo Alberto Coraggio, arrived in Natal, bringing the Capitoline Column, donated by the head of the Italian government, the fascist Benito Mussolini, with the objective of commemorating the union Rome-Natal, carried out by the aviators Del Prete and Ferrarin. Five days later, the state capital was visited by the Italian Air Force squadron.

Four years later, the Communist uprising occurred, led mainly by communists and formed by segments of the population unhappy with the governmental actions of Mário Câmara. The rebellion was victorious and caused great unrest in the city of Natal, such as the murder of several people and the robbery of bank branches. The biggest resistance was made by the police authority, commanded by Major Luís Júlio and Colonel Pinto Soares. On 25 November 1935, the Popular Revolutionary Committee was installed and the newspaper Liberdade began circulating. The failure of the moviment in the cities of Recife and Rio de Janeiro caused the rebels to abandon Natal and move towards the Seridó region. There, repression was carried out violently, and later the Communist uprising was ended.

Natal was not only a place of violence. Its geographical location, close to the corner of the continent, also made the city occupy a very prominent place in the history of aviation back in the days of seaplane, when great pilots passed through the city. During the World War II, the city became even more famous and internationally known after the Americans built a megabase that played a very significant role during the conflict and became known as the Trampoline of Victory, currently located in Parnamirim.

In 1943, the state capital hosted the Natal Conference, with the presence of Getúlio Vargas and Franklin Delano Roosevelt, presidents of Brazil and the United States, respectively. From then on, North Americans began to occupy the territory, culminating in a change of habits in the town and the growth of the local population. A stronger relationship between the native inhabitants and American military was established, with numerous dances being held, which allowed the arrival of different musical rhythms from abroad.

In 1945, Vargas retires from power and a democratic period begins in the country. In 1951, he returns to the presidency, where he stays until 24 August 1954, when he commits suicide; in his place Café Filho, the first and only native of Rio Grande do Norte to occupy the presidency, takes over.

In the 1960s, populism established a strong presence in Rio Grande do Norte through Aluízio Alves, responsible for the beginning of the state's modernization, and Djalma Maranhão, a radical and left-wing politician. In 1964, a coup d'état put an end to João Goulart's government and initiated a military dictatorship that lasted from 1964 to 1985. In Rio Grande do Norte, this coup d'état was characterized by persecutions of young people and intellectuals of the region. Politicians such as Aluízio Alves, Garibaldi Alves, and Agnelo Alves, for example, had their rights suspended by Institutional Act No. 5, of 1968.

From 1974, with the discovery of oil, the state's economy, which until then was hampered by long dry periods, began to grow. Tourism is also one of the fastest growing sectors in the state. Recent governments have made important changes, as occurred in the administration of Garibaldi Alves, who raised irrigation as one of the priority goals, aiming to interconnect watersheds and bring good quality water to surviving families in dry regions and irrigate a dense area of the state territory.

Currently, Rio Grande do Norte is divided into 167 municipalities, with Natal as the capital. The current governor is Fátima Bezerra, who has been in office since 1 January 2019.

== See also ==
- Historic Center of Natal
