= Church of Our Lady of the Presentation =

Oldest existing church in the state of Rio de Janeiro

- Igreja de Nossa Senhora da Apresentação
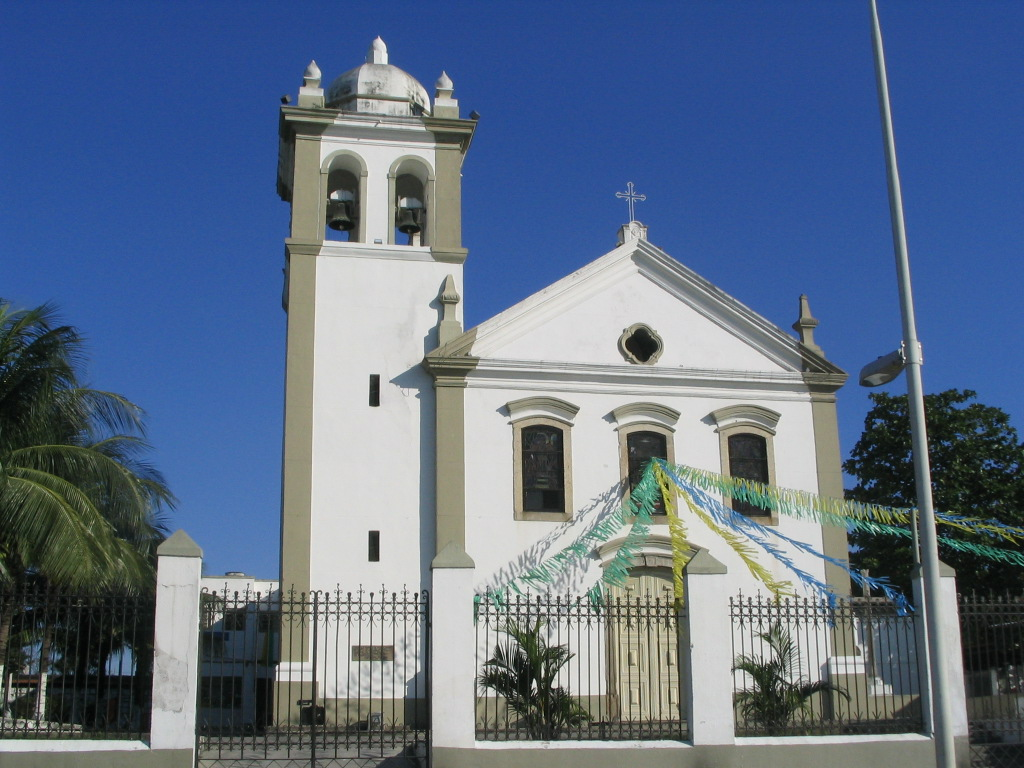
- Facade of the church in Irajá
- Church of Our Lady of the Presentation
- 22°49′53″S 43°19′35″W
- Address: 272 Praça Nossa Senhora da Apresentação, Irajá, Rio de Janeiro
- Country: Brazil
- Denomination: Roman Catholic
- Website: apresentacao.org

History
- Founded: November 21, 1613
- Dedication: Our Lady of the Presentation

Architecture
- Style: Baroque

Administration
- Archdiocese: Archdiocese of Rio de Janeiro

The Church of Our Lady of the Presentation (Portuguese: Igreja de Nossa Senhora da Apresentação) is a historic Roman Catholic church located in the neighborhood of Irajá, in Rio de Janeiro, Brazil. Founded in 1613, it is considered the oldest church in the state of Rio de Janeiro.

The church is located at Praça Nossa Senhora da Apresentação and is noted for its primitive Baroque style.

== History ==
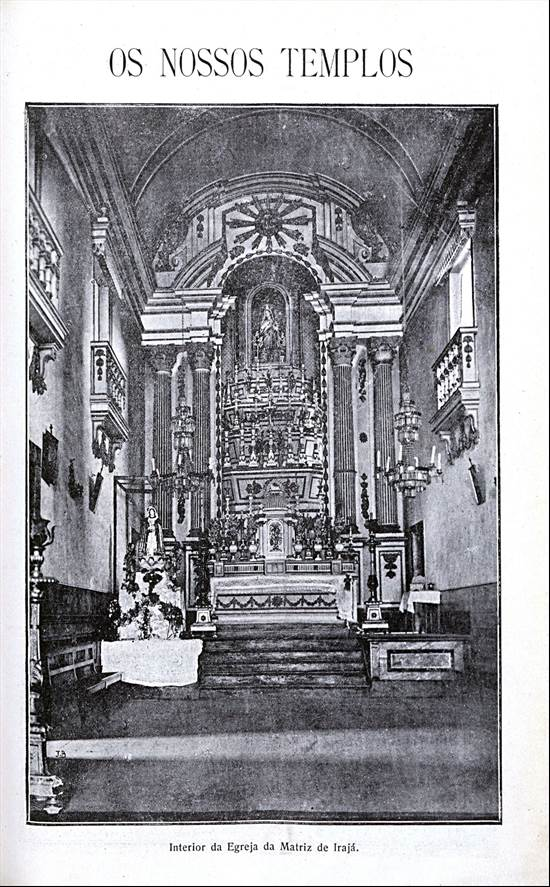
Interior of the parish in 1912.

The history of the church is directly linked to the founding of the Irajá neighborhood in the North Zone of Rio de Janeiro. It originated in 1613, when Gaspar da Costa built the Baroque Chapel of Irajá. Construction began in 1596 and was funded by the local community.

Gaspar's son instituted the Parish of Our Lady of the Presentation of Irajá on December 30, 1644, becoming its first Vicar. The parish became the Matriz (Mother Church) of the neighborhood, confirmed by a Royal Decree from King John IV on February 10, 1647. Through this decree, residents of Irajá who were previously subordinate to the Candelária parish were transferred to the parish of Our Lady of the Presentation.

It is claimed to be the oldest standing church in the city. Two churches existed before it: the original Church of Candelária (demolished in 1811 to be rebuilt) and another church lost with the demolition of Morro do Castelo. The second oldest is the Convent of Saint Anthony, in Largo da Carioca, inaugurated in 1620.

Historical accounts state that Emperor Pedro II, when traveling to the Imperial Palace of Petrópolis, would stop his cortege at the Church of Our Lady of the Presentation for prayers. The Empress Consort, Teresa Cristina, Pedro II's wife, donated a three-piece chest of drawers to the church for storing vestments and three benches that belonged to the Royal Chapel.

Until 1993, the area that now houses a garden and an ossuary was the site of the brotherhood's cemetery, which had not seen a burial since the 1940s.

The current bells were cast from pieces of the old ones and inaugurated by parish priest Jan Kaleta on November 8, 1989, in the presence of the then Archbishop of Rio de Janeiro, Cardinal Eugênio Sales.

The church was listed as a heritage site by a decree of Mayor Cesar Maia on January 28, 1994.

In 2025, the parish became one of the jubilee churches for the Jubilee of Hope.

== Features ==
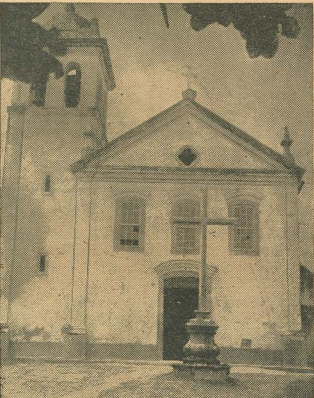
Facade, circa 1946. Note the crucifix in front of the church which is no longer there.

The date 1613 is engraved on the granite portal of the temple's entrance.

Despite renovations, the church maintains original relics, such as the high altar, the tabernacle, and the baptismal font, as well as a 19th-century image of Our Lady of the Presentation made of wood, likely of Portuguese origin.

Buried beneath the altar are some benefactors, such as Honório Gurgel, a politician and landowner.

One of its oldest pieces is the 17th-century main door, measuring nearly four meters in height and two meters in width.

Also on the facade, in the choir windows where the date 1613 is engraved, there are three stained glass windows, including one of the Holy Family and another of Saint Anne. Above them is the Oculus with Cross, containing an icon of a Greek Cross with rays of light.

Inside the church, in the baptistery, there is a marble baptismal font dating from the 18th century.

In its atrium, beneath the choir, there are three paintings by Sebastião Andrade from 1965: one of the Holy Family in their daily life, another of Saint Joseph teaching his trade to Jesus, and one of Our Lady of Exile.

The ceiling of the choir and the nave contains 20th-century paintings of biblical figures such as the Prophet Daniel, Prophet Ezekiel, and Prophet Jeremiah, as well as saints Bernard of Clairvaux and Cecilia.

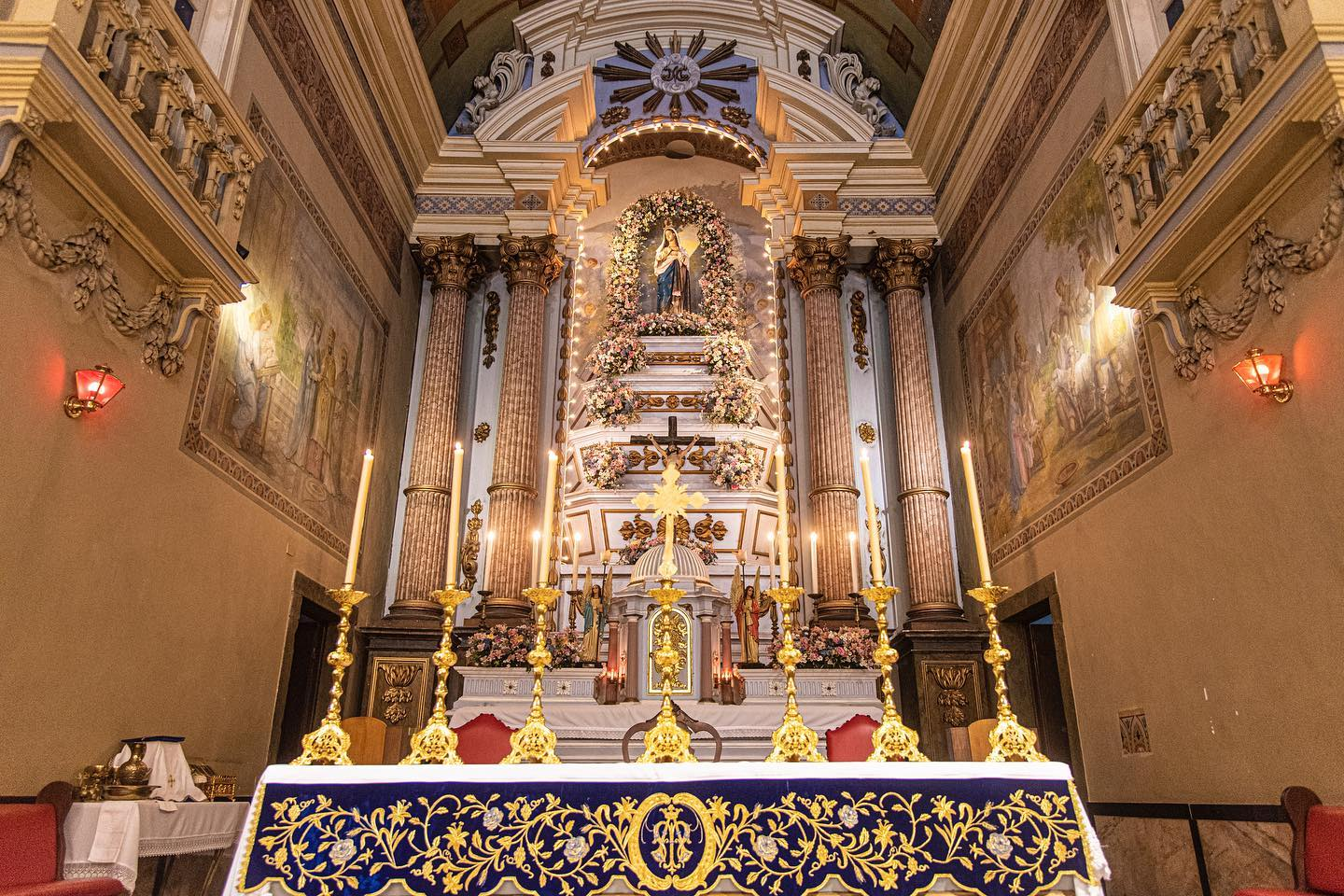
Chancel of the church

The nave is surrounded by nineteen medallions, each measuring 1.5 meters in height and width, containing distinct paintings.

In the chancel, there are paintings depicting the Nativity of Mary, the Marriage of the Virgin and Saint Joseph, and the Visitation. All are also from the 20th century.

The parish is responsible for a chapel dedicated to Our Lady of Graces located in the Vila São Jorge community (known as "Para Pedro") in the neighborhood of Colégio.
