= Cidade Alta (Natal) =

Neighborhood of Natal, Rio Grande do Norte

Cidade Alta Centro
- Neighborhood
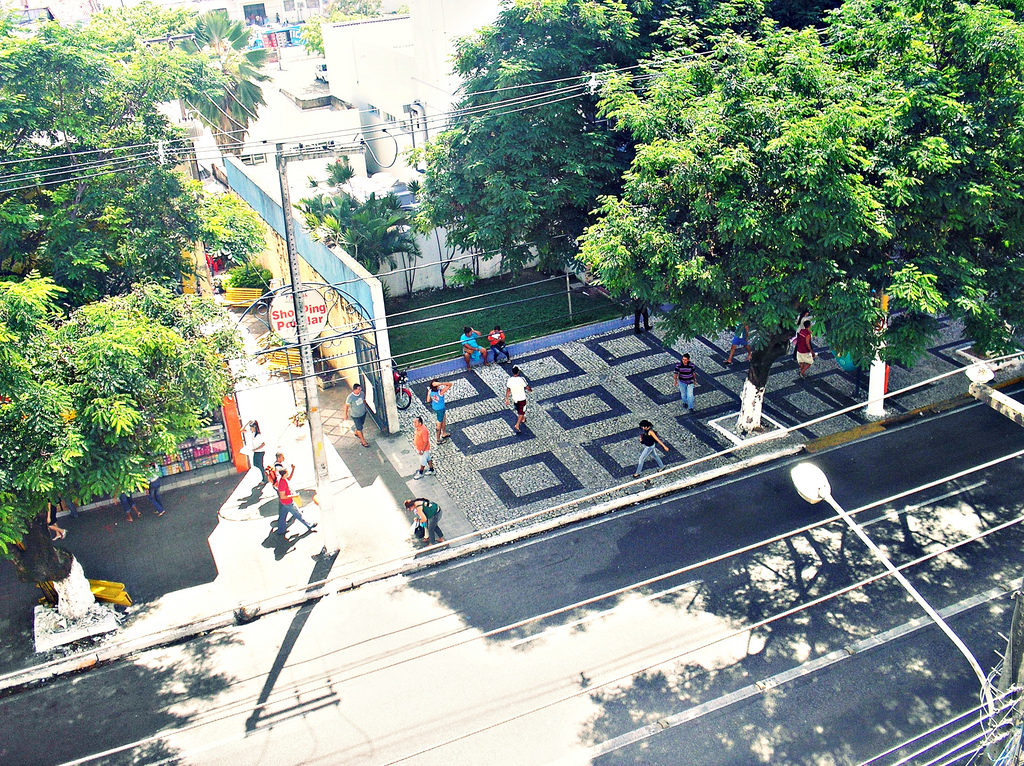
- Photo of Rio Branco Avenue

- Location of Cidade Alta in Natal.
- Country: Brazil
- State: Rio Grande do Norte
- City: Natal

Area
  - Total: 9,410 ha (23,300 acres)

Population
  - Total: 6.692

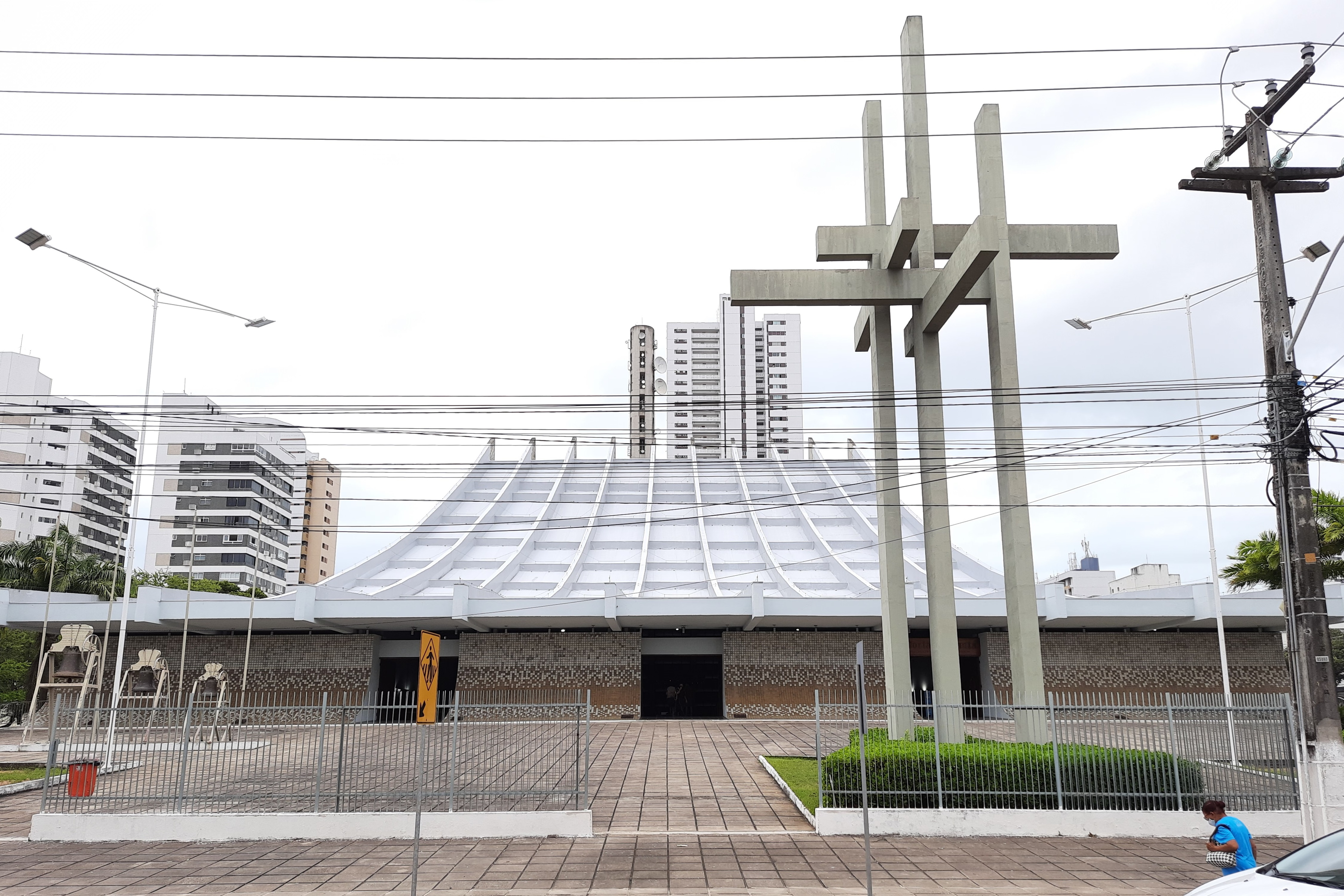
The new Cathedral of Our Lady of the Presentation on Deodoro da Fonseca Avenue.

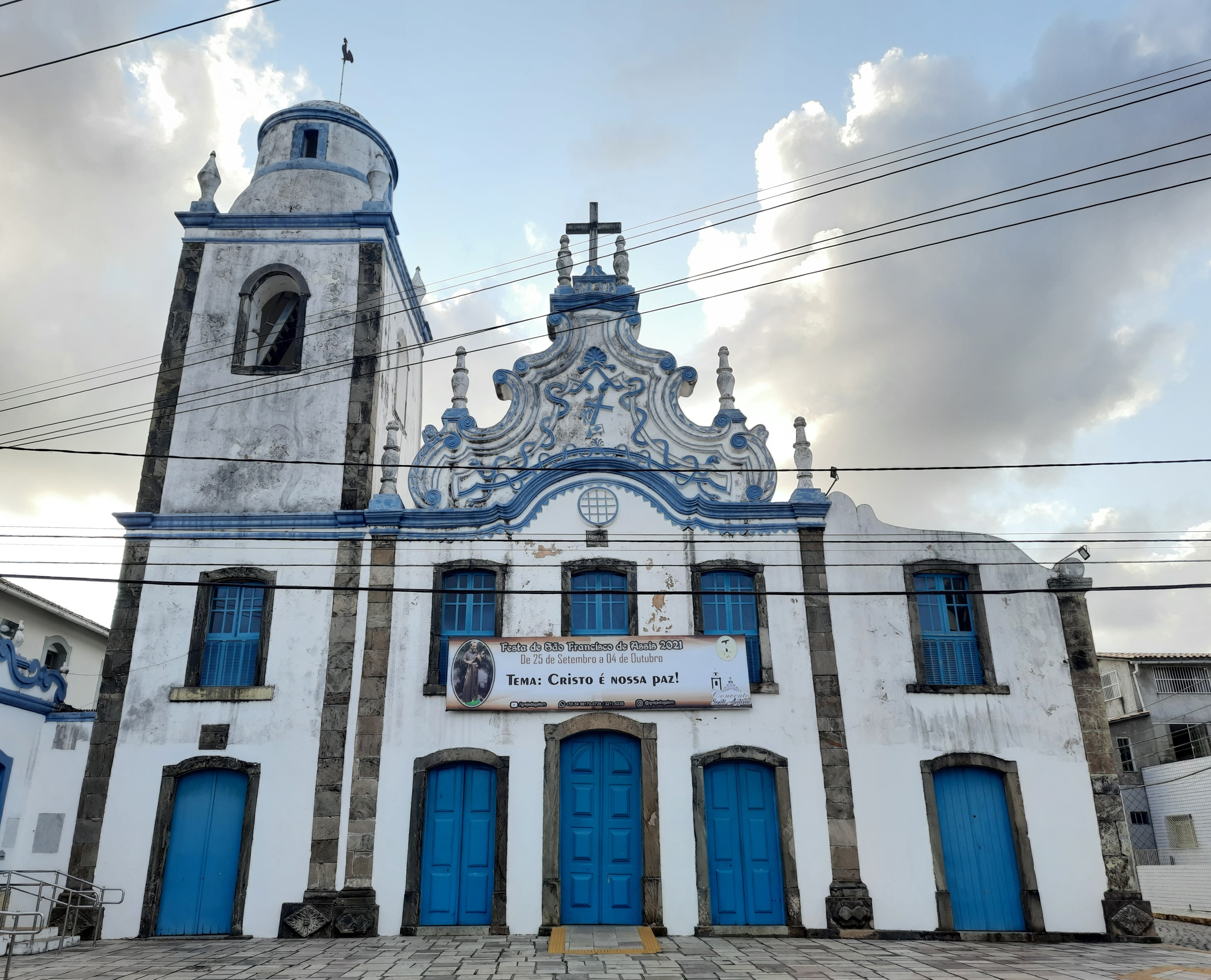
The Church of Saint Anthony (Igreja do Galo) in Cidade Alta.

Cidade Alta, also known as Centro (English: Downtown), is a neighborhood in the city of Natal, in Rio Grande do Norte, and was the first one to be created in the capital, on December 25, 1599.

== History ==
The site of the future city of Natal was chosen because it was on firm, high ground on the right bank of the Potenji River. In the André de Albuquerque Square, located in the neighborhood, the Pelourinho and the Church of Our Lady of the Presentation (Old Cathedral) were inaugurated, in 1599, with the celebration of the first mass. In this neighborhood was located the first street of the city that, initially, was called Rua Grande (English: Big Street). The jail, the Senate House and the Government House were situated on this section, along with the tax office, later known as the Royal Treasury, and the Church of Our Lady of the Rosary of the Black People, which constitute the historic center of Natal.

The cobblestoned streets of the neighborhood appeared only in the second half of the 19th century. After Rua Grande, the second largest road in the Cidade Alta was Santo Antônio Street, famous for its location and proximity to the fountain of the "drinking water river".

The history of Cidade Alta is very much intertwined with that of Natal, since the city grew very slowly in the first centuries of its existence. According to Luís da Câmara Cascudo, it was Mayor Omar O'Grady who put Natal on the path to the 20th century, by replacing the colonial embankment with cobblestone paving on Junqueira Aires Avenue. In 1935, the mayor Miguel Bilro extended Rio Branco Avenue to Ribeira, through Vila Barreto. In the 20th century, the verticalization process of Natal begins, with the destruction of old mansions and the architectural memory of the neighborhood and, consequently, of the city.

== Characteristics ==
=== Commercial neighborhood ===
Cidade Alta is an important commercial neighborhood since it has many stores located along Rio Branco Avenue and João Pessoa Street, as well as in the vicinity of these roads. Historically, the area was mostly filled with businesses of different types, as well as different financial institutions, becoming the largest commercial center of Natal for many years.

However, nowadays, the neighborhood is facing a decrease in this activity, which has fallen due to competition and the migration of customers and shopkeepers to the large shopping centers in the capital, as well as to the Alecrim neighborhood, which remains relevant in this area. Another important factor for the retraction in commercial activity in the downtown area was the COVID-19 Pandemic, which led many merchants to close their doors. As a reflection of this conjuncture, the Cidade Alta registered in 2021 the lowest number of active businesses in 10 years, a situation that worsened in 2022 with the deactivation of anchor stores and the inertia of the public authorities, according to local merchants.

=== Historic buildings and constructions ===
The neighborhood houses the headquarters of the City Hall of Natal and the Legislative Assembly of Rio Grande do Norte, besides having in its respective circumscription, for many years, the headquarters of the Court of Justice of the State of Rio Grande do Norte.

The region has diversified architecture stamped in several historical buildings, such as the Pinacoteca Potiguar, which housed the State Government of Rio Grande do Norte.

The neighborhood also has the Santa Cruz da Bica landmark, an important monument built in 1599 with the intention of demarcating the urban limits of the city, as well as sedimenting the Catholic faith.

=== Artistic and cultural center ===
In the 1980s, Cidade Alta was established as one of the main meeting places for the local population, when it brought together, besides the traditional department stores, movie theaters, snack bars, cafes, and other attractions for the families of Natal. However, as the city grew, the area lost its vitality and became deserted at night.

This scenario has been changing through the years, considering the resistance of small entrepreneurs, artists, and cultural producers, who have sought to occupy the area with cultural activities, a movement that has also been gaining support from the government.

One of the symbols of cultural resistance in the neighborhood is Beco da Lama, a bohemian cultural space that has become a reference in the city. The Beco has different events, bars, and urban panels that exhibit graffiti art, and is frequented by different social classes in the city, bringing movement to the neighborhood at night.

== See also ==
- André de Albuquerque Square
