= Alberto Maranhão Theatre =

Theatre in Natal, Brazil

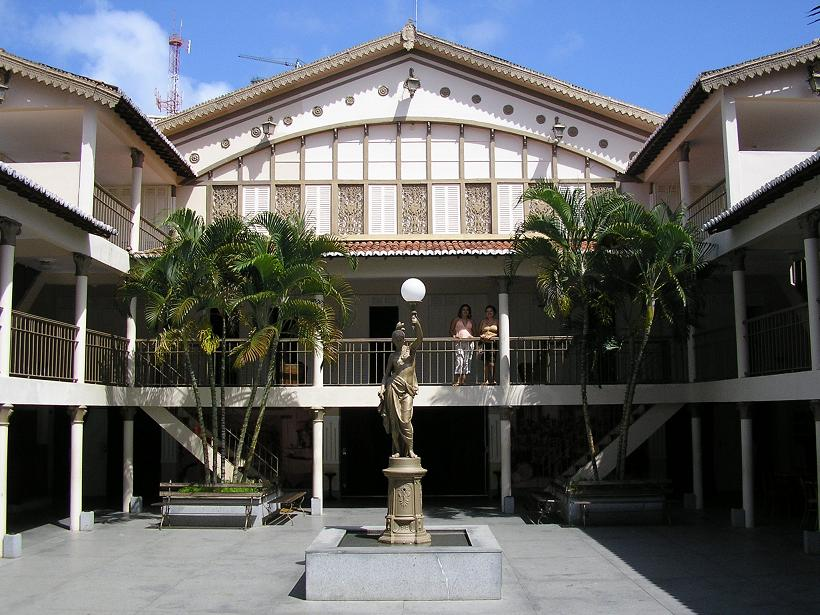
- View inside the theater
- Interactive map of the Alberto Maranhão Theatre area
- Former names: Carlos Gomes Theatre; Gran-Campañia Española de Zarzuela, Opera y Opereta Pablo López

General information
- Location: Natal, Rio Grande do Norte, Brazil
- Coordinates: 5.77954°S 35.2047°W
- Construction started: 1898
- Inaugurated: 1904
- Renovated: c. 1910s, 1959, 1988, 2004

Design and construction
- Engineer: José de Berredo

Website
- Official website

National Historic Heritage of Brazil
- Type: Indeferido
- Designated: 1963
- Reference no.: 696

The Alberto Maranhão Theatre is a theatre located in the city of Natal, state of Rio Grande do Norte, Brazil.

"At the Teatro Alberto Maranhão, by its history, architectural beauty and tradition, the happiness of being here, walking in this place so full of artistic past."

— Fernanda Montenegro (translated literally)

== History ==
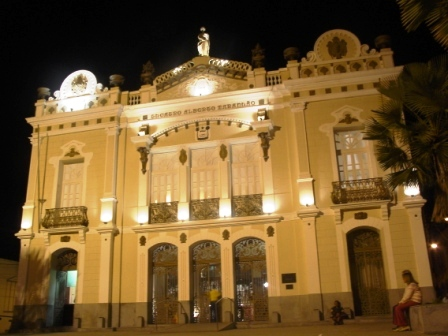
Exterior view at night

The theater is a monument listed by the Institute of Historical and Artistic Heritage of Rio Grande do Norte. It was designed by the engineer José de Berredo; construction started in 1898, under the direction of Major Theodósio Paiva. It was inaugurated in the year 1904, and originally was named the Carlos Gomes Theatre.

In the second government of Alberto Maranhão, the theater closed for renovations. It reopened as the "Gran-Campañia Española de Zarzuela, Opera y Opereta Pablo López", 19 July 1912, with the operetta "Princesa dos dólares" ("Princess of dollars") by Leo Fall.

In 1957, Mayor Djalma Maranhão changed its name to Teatro Alberto Maranhão. In 1959 it was further renovated, and reopened on 24 March 1960.

The José Augusto Foundation initiated a new renovation in June 1988, including dressing rooms, auditorium, garden, audience and stage, trying to restore it under the technical supervision of the Coordinator of the Historical and Artistic Patrimony of the State. On its centennial in 2004, another renovation began focused on accessibility, air conditioning, and general repairs.

== See also ==
- City Council of Natal
