= Microregion of Seridó Ocidental =

Coordinates: 6°27′28″S 37°05′52″W

Seridó Ocidental
- Microregion
- Country: Brazil
- State: Rio Grande do Norte
- Mesoregion: Central Potiguar

Seridó Ocidental was a microregion in the Brazilian state of Rio Grande do Norte.

== Municipalities ==
The microregion consisted of the following municipalities:

- Caicó
- Ipueira
- Jardim de Piranhas
- São Fernando
- São João do Sabugi
- Serra Negra do Norte
- Timbaúba dos Batistas
