= Caicó =

Municipality in Rio Grande do Norte, Brazil

Coordinates: 6°27′28″S 37°05′52″W

Caicó City of Prince
- Municipality
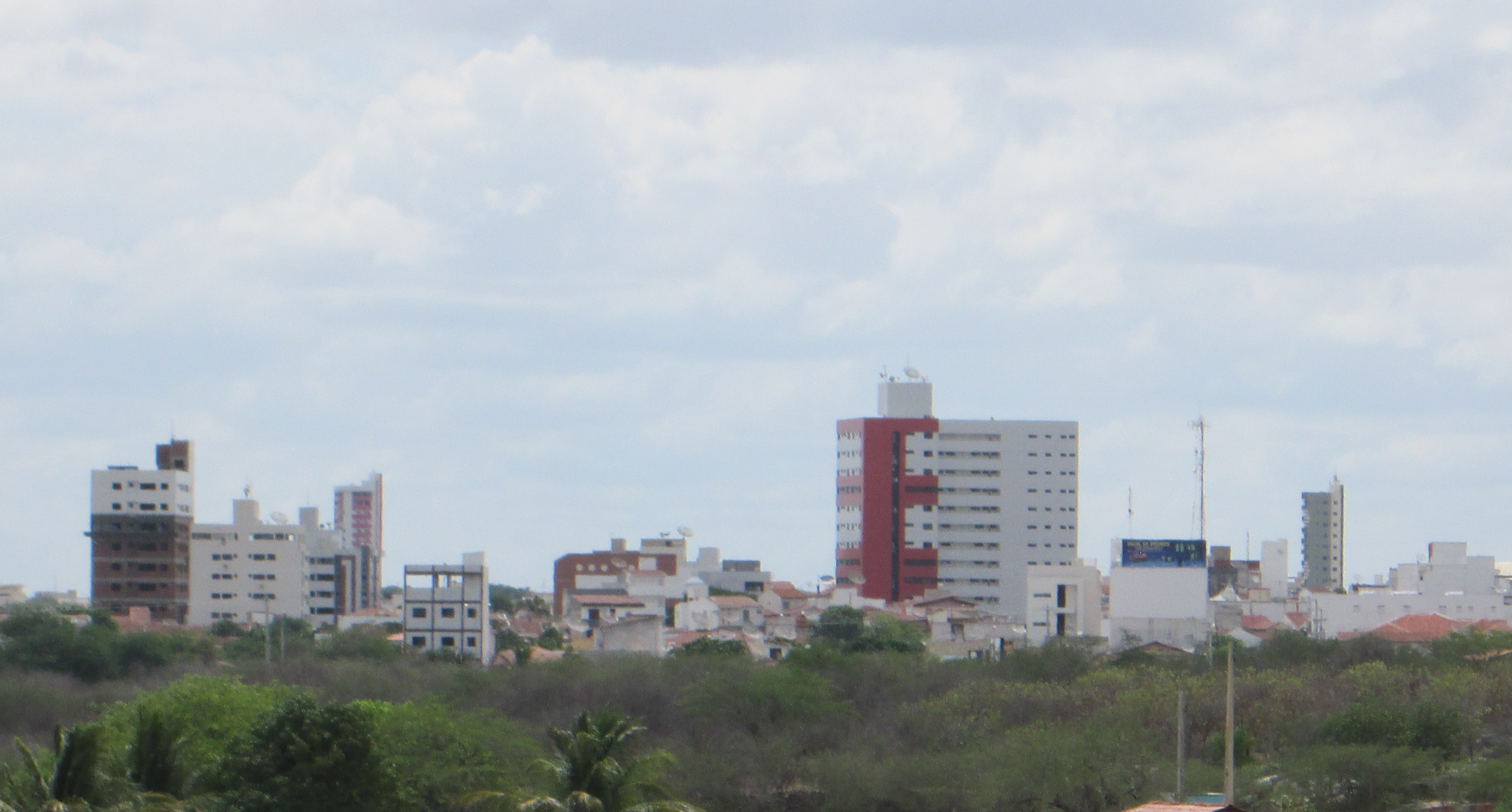
- Caicó

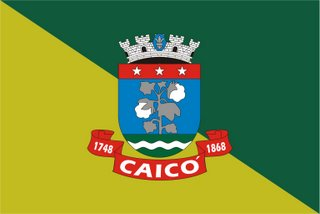
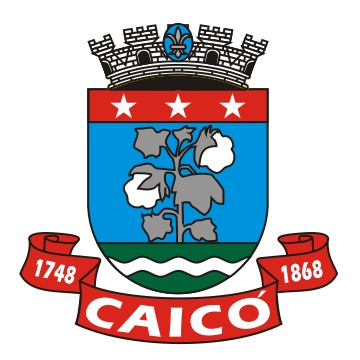
- Flag Coat of arms

- Country: Brazil
- Region: Nordeste
- State: Rio Grande do Norte
- Mesoregion: Central Potiguar

Government
  - Type: Democracy
  - Mayor: Judas Tadeu Alves dos Santos PSDB

Population (2022)
  - Total: 61,146
- Time zone: UTC -3

Caicó is a municipality in the state of Rio Grande do Norte in the Northeast region of Brazil. With an area of 1,228.583 square kilometers (474.359 sq mi), of which 14.0727 square kilometres (5.4335 sq mi) is urban, it is located 222 km from Natal, the state capital, and 1,572 km from Brasília, the federal capital. Its population in the 2022 demographic census was 61,146 inhabitants, according to the Brazilian Institute of Geography and Statistics (IBGE), ranking as the eighth most populous municipality in the state of Rio Grande do Norte.

== History ==
Around 1700, scouts from the Captaincy of Paraíba arrived in the region and began relentless pursuits against the Caicó Indigenous people, who lived near the confluence of the Barra Nova and Seridó rivers. After several violent confrontations, the Indigenous inhabitants were expelled, making way for the arrival of settlers, primarily focused on livestock farming. Small pastoral communities began to form, drawn by the region’s abundant pastureland and water sources.

The first land allotments (known as datas) were requested shortly thereafter, and news of a fertile area suitable for cattle raising attracted settlers from Paraíba, Pernambuco, and Portugal. Among the earliest documented settlers were Captain Inácio Gomes da Câmara, Lieutenant José Gomes Pereira, and Manoel de Souza Fortes.

By 1748, the settlement of Seridó belonged to the parish of Piancó, in the present-day state of Paraíba. On 15 April of the same year, a royal charter elevated the settlement to an administrative district under the name Caicó—a name derived from the Indigenous tribe that once inhabited the area and meaning "thin scrubland."

The municipality was officially created by Royal Order on 22 July 1766 and implemented by the Government of Pernambuco on 28 April 1788 under the name Vila Nova do Príncipe. It was granted city status on 16 December 1868, by Provincial Law No. 612. Later, through State Decree No. 12 of 1 February 1890, the municipality was renamed Seridó. The name Caicó was restored by State Decree No. 33, issued on 7 July 1890.

== Geography ==
The territory of Caicó covers 1,228.583 square kilometers (474.359 sq mi), of which 14.0727 square kilometres (5.4335 sq mi) constitutes the urban area. It sits at an average altitude of 151 meters above sea level. Caicó borders these municipalities: to the north, Jucurutu, Florânia, and São Fernando; to the south, São João do Sabugi and the state of Paraíba (Várzea); to the east, São José do Seridó, Cruzeta, Jardim do Seridó, and Ouro Branco; and to the west, Timbaúba dos Batistas, São Fernando, and Serra Negra do Norte. The city is located 222 km from the state capital Natal, and 1,572 km from the federal capital Brasília.

Under the territorial division established in 2017 by the Brazilian Institute of Geography and Statistics (IBGE), the municipality belongs to the immediate geographical region of Caicó, within the intermediate region of Caicó. Previously, under the microregion and mesoregion divisions, it was part of the microregion of Seridó Ocidental in the mesoregion of Central Potiguar.

=== Climate ===
Caicó has a hot semi-arid climate (Köppen climate classification BSh), subject to variability, and the dry periods (droughts) may last more than one year. Rain falls between February and May, with an average annual precipitation of 700 millimetres or 27.6 inches. There are about 3,000 hours of average sunshine annually. Beside Mossoró and Pau dos Ferros, both in Western Rio Grande do Norte, Caicó is one of the hottest cities in the state with temperatures reaching up to 38 °C (100 °F) during the day.

According to the Brazilian National Institute of Meteorology, since 1995 the lowest temperature recorded in Caicó was 16.3 °C (61.3 °F) on March 16, 2008, and the highest reached 40 °C (104 °F) on January 18, 2003 and January 28, 2007. The highest cumulative rainfall recorded in 24 hours was 171.2 millimetres (6.7 in) on January 22, 1996.

Climate data for Caicó (Serido) (1981–2010 normals, extremes 1995–2015)
Month	Jan	Feb	Mar	Apr	May	Jun	Jul	Aug	Sep	Oct	Nov	Dec	Year
Record high °C (°F)	40 (104)	39.2 (102.6)	39.8 (103.6)	39.2 (102.6)	38.6 (101.5)	36.6 (97.9)	37.6 (99.7)	38.8 (101.8)	38.8 (101.8)	39.8 (103.6)	39.8 (103.6)	39.8 (103.6)	40 (104)
Mean daily maximum °C (°F)	36.0 (96.8)	35.3 (95.5)	34.6 (94.3)	33.9 (93.0)	33.4 (92.1)	32.5 (90.5)	33.0 (91.4)	33.9 (93.0)	35.5 (95.9)	36.8 (98.2)	37.1 (98.8)	36.9 (98.4)	34.9 (94.8)
Daily mean °C (°F)	29.3 (84.7)	28.7 (83.7)	28.2 (82.8)	27.7 (81.9)	27.4 (81.3)	26.7 (80.1)	26.8 (80.2)	27.3 (81.1)	28.3 (82.9)	29.3 (84.7)	29.8 (85.6)	29.8 (85.6)	28.3 (82.9)
Mean daily minimum °C (°F)	24.1 (75.4)	23.8 (74.8)	23.5 (74.3)	23.1 (73.6)	22.6 (72.7)	21.9 (71.4)	21.5 (70.7)	21.5 (70.7)	22.2 (72.0)	23.3 (73.9)	23.8 (74.8)	24.2 (75.6)	23.0 (73.4)
Record low °C (°F)	20.4 (68.7)	20.2 (68.4)	16.3 (61.3)	16.8 (62.2)	17.0 (62.6)	18.0 (64.4)	17.4 (63.3)	17.6 (63.7)	19.0 (66.2)	20.2 (68.4)	20.4 (68.7)	20.2 (68.4)	16.3 (61.3)
Average precipitation mm (inches)	96.9 (3.81)	91.3 (3.59)	144.6 (5.69)	147.5 (5.81)	73.3 (2.89)	23.6 (0.93)	11.6 (0.46)	8.1 (0.32)	0.7 (0.03)	9.2 (0.36)	2.7 (0.11)	20.0 (0.79)	629.5 (24.78)
Average precipitation days (≥ 1.0 mm)	7	7	10	11	8	2	3	1	0	1	0	2	52
Average relative humidity (%)	62.0	66.8	72.3	74.6	71.5	68.0	61.9	56.2	52.6	53.1	52.3	55.3	62.2
Mean monthly sunshine hours	228.7	207.1	228.0	213.6	204.5	167.0	194.2	242.2	283.0	294.2	282.1	248.5	2,793.1
Source 1: Instituto Nacional de Meteorologia
Source 2: Brazilian National Institute of Meteorology (extremes).

== Demographics ==
In the 2022 census, the municipality had a population of 61,146 inhabitants and ranked eighth in the state that year (out of 167 municipalities), with 52.42% female and 47.58% male, resulting in a sex ratio of 90.77 (9,077 men for every 10,000 women), compared to 62,709 inhabitants in the 2010 census (91.63% living in the urban area), when it held the seventh state position. Between the 2010 and 2022 censuses, the population of Caicó changed at an annual geometric growth rate of -0.21%. Regarding age group in the 2022 census, 70.84% of the inhabitants were between 15 and 64 years old, 17.02% were under fifteen, and 12.13% were 65 or older. The population density in 2022 was 49.77 inhabitants per square kilometer. There were 22,067 housing units with an average of 2.75 inhabitants per household.

The municipality's Human Development Index (HDI-M) was considered high, according to data from the United Nations Development Programme (UNDP). According to the 2010 report published in 2013, its value was 0.71, ranking seventh in the state and 1,595th nationally (out of 5,565 municipalities), and the Gini coefficient rose from 0.47 in 2003 to 0.56 in 2010. Considering only the longevity index, its value is 0.824, the income index is 0.703, and the education index is 0.619.

== See also ==
- List of municipalities in Rio Grande do Norte
