= Microregion of Seridó Oriental =

Coordinates: 6°15′39″S 36°30′54″W

Seridó Oriental
- Microregion
- Country: Brazil
- State: Rio Grande do Norte
- Mesoregion: Central Potiguar

Area
  - Total: 3,825.73 km^{2} (1,477.12 sq mi)

Seridó Oriental was a microregion in the Brazilian state of Rio Grande do Norte. It had a total area of 3,825.73 square kilometers (1,477.1 sq mi).

== Municipalities ==
The microregion consisted of the following municipalities:

- Acari
- Carnaúba dos Dantas
- Cruzeta
- Currais Novos
- Equador
- Jardim do Seridó
- Ouro Branco
- Parelhas
- Santana do Seridó
- São José do Seridó
