= Bodó, Rio Grande do Norte =

Municipality in Rio Grande do Norte, Brazil

Bodó
- Municipality
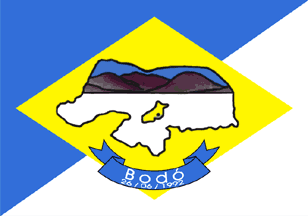
- Flag

- Location in Brazil
- Coordinates: 5.98778°S 36.4128°W
- Country: Brazil
- Region: Nordeste
- State: Rio Grande do Norte
- Mesoregion: Central Potiguar

Population (2022)
  - Total: 2,306
- Time zone: UTC -3

Bodó is a municipality in the state of Rio Grande do Norte in the Northeast region of Brazil. With an area of 253.519 square kilometers (97.884 sq mi), of which 0.5772 square kilometres (0.2229 sq mi) is urban, it is located 135 km from Natal, the state capital, and 1,663 km from Brasília, the federal capital. Its population in the 2022 demographic census was 2,306 inhabitants, according to the Brazilian Institute of Geography and Statistics (IBGE), ranking as the 162nd most populous municipality in the state of Rio Grande do Norte.

== Geography ==
The territory of Bodó covers 253.519 square kilometers (97.884 sq mi), of which 0.5772 square kilometres (0.2229 sq mi) constitutes the urban area. It sits at an average altitude of 560 meters above sea level. Bodó borders these municipalities: to the north, Santana do Matos; to the south, Cerro Corá and Lagoa Nova; to the east, Cerro Corá; and to the west, Santana do Matos. The city is located 135 km from the state capital Natal, and 1,663 km from the federal capital Brasília.

Under the territorial division established in 2017 by the Brazilian Institute of Geography and Statistics (IBGE), the municipality belongs to the immediate geographical region of Currais Novos, within the intermediate region of Caicó. Previously, under the microregion and mesoregion divisions, it was part of the microregion of Serra de Santana in the mesoregion of Central Potiguar.

== Demographics ==
In the 2022 census, the municipality had a population of 2,306 inhabitants and ranked 162nd in the state that year (out of 167 municipalities), with 50.43% male and 49.57% female, resulting in a sex ratio of 101.75 (10,175 men for every 10,000 women), compared to 2,425 inhabitants in the 2010 census (57.44% living in the urban area), when it held the 161st state position. Between the 2010 and 2022 censuses, the population of Bodó changed at an annual geometric growth rate of -0.42%. Regarding age group in the 2022 census, 69.82% of the inhabitants were between 15 and 64 years old, 18.34% were under fifteen, and 11.85% were 65 or older. The population density in 2022 was 9.1 inhabitants per square kilometer. There were 765 housing units with an average of 3.01 inhabitants per household.

The municipality's Human Development Index (HDI-M) was considered medium, according to data from the United Nations Development Programme (UNDP). According to the 2010 report published in 2013, its value was 0.629, ranking 41st in the state and 3,501st nationally (out of 5,565 municipalities), and the Gini coefficient rose from 0.36 in 2003 to 0.52 in 2010. Considering only the longevity index, its value is 0.772, the income index is 0.57, and the education index is 0.565.

== See also ==
- List of municipalities in Rio Grande do Norte
