= Microregion of Serra de Santana =

Coordinates: 5°57′28″S 36°39′21″W

Serra de Santana
- Microregion
- Country: Brazil
- State: Rio Grande do Norte
- Mesoregion: Central Potiguar

Serra de Santana was a microregion in the Brazilian state of Rio Grande do Norte.

== Municipalities ==
The microregion consisted of the following municipalities:

- Bodó
- Cerro Corá
- Florânia
- Lagoa Nova
- Santana do Matos
- São Vicente
- Tenente Laurentino Cruz
