= Ipueira =

Municipality in Rio Grande do Norte, Brazil

Coordinates: 6.81389°S 37.1989°W

- Municipality
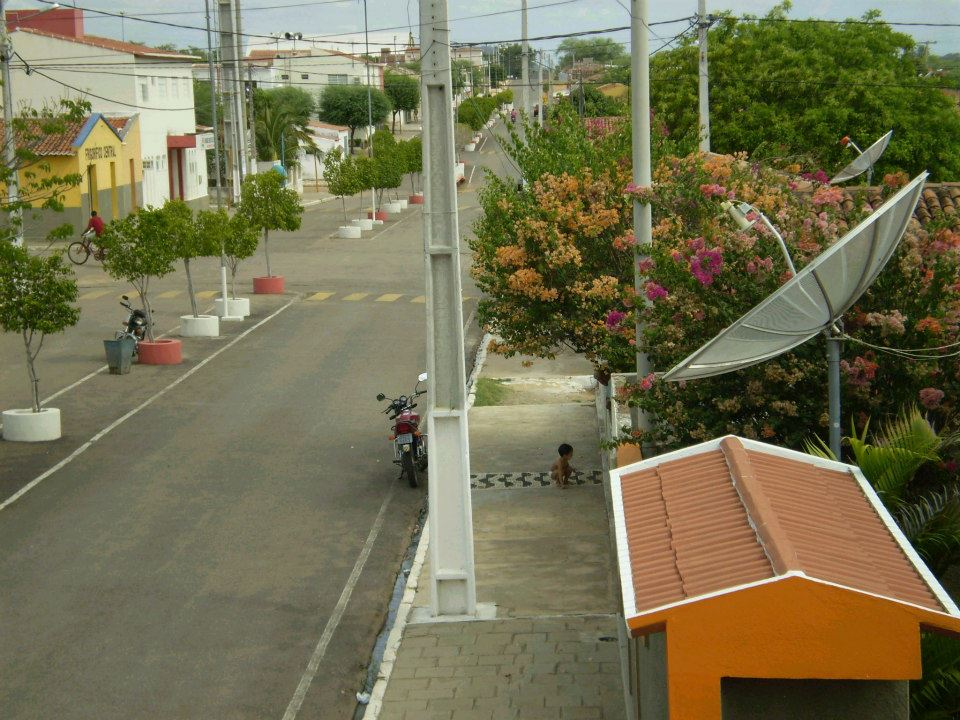
- Vista da Avenida Principal

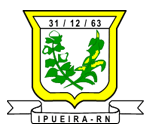
- Flag Coat of arms
- Interactive map of Ipueira
- Country: Brazil
- Region: Nordeste
- State: Rio Grande do Norte
- Mesoregion: Central Potiguar

Population (2020)
  - Total: 2,253
- Time zone: UTC−3 (BRT)

Ipueira is a municipality in the interior of the state of Rio Grande do Norte in the Northeast region of Brazil, in the region of Seridó. It is located 318 kilometers to the southwest of Natal, the state capital, and has an area of 127 km^{2} and is located at the midway point between Caicó (in Rio Grande do Norte) and Patos (in Paraiba). It has a population (as estimated in 2020 by IBGE) of 2,253 people, making it the third least populous municipal in the state.

Ipueira was separated from the municipality São João do Sabugi in the 1960s. The name is formed from combining the words iapo (meaning igapó) with the Portuguese suffix -eira. It has a human development index of 0.679 (2010), the eighth highest in Rio Grande do Norte, and considered average by the United Nations Development Programme.

== See also ==
- List of municipalities in Rio Grande do Norte
