= Oiticica Dam =

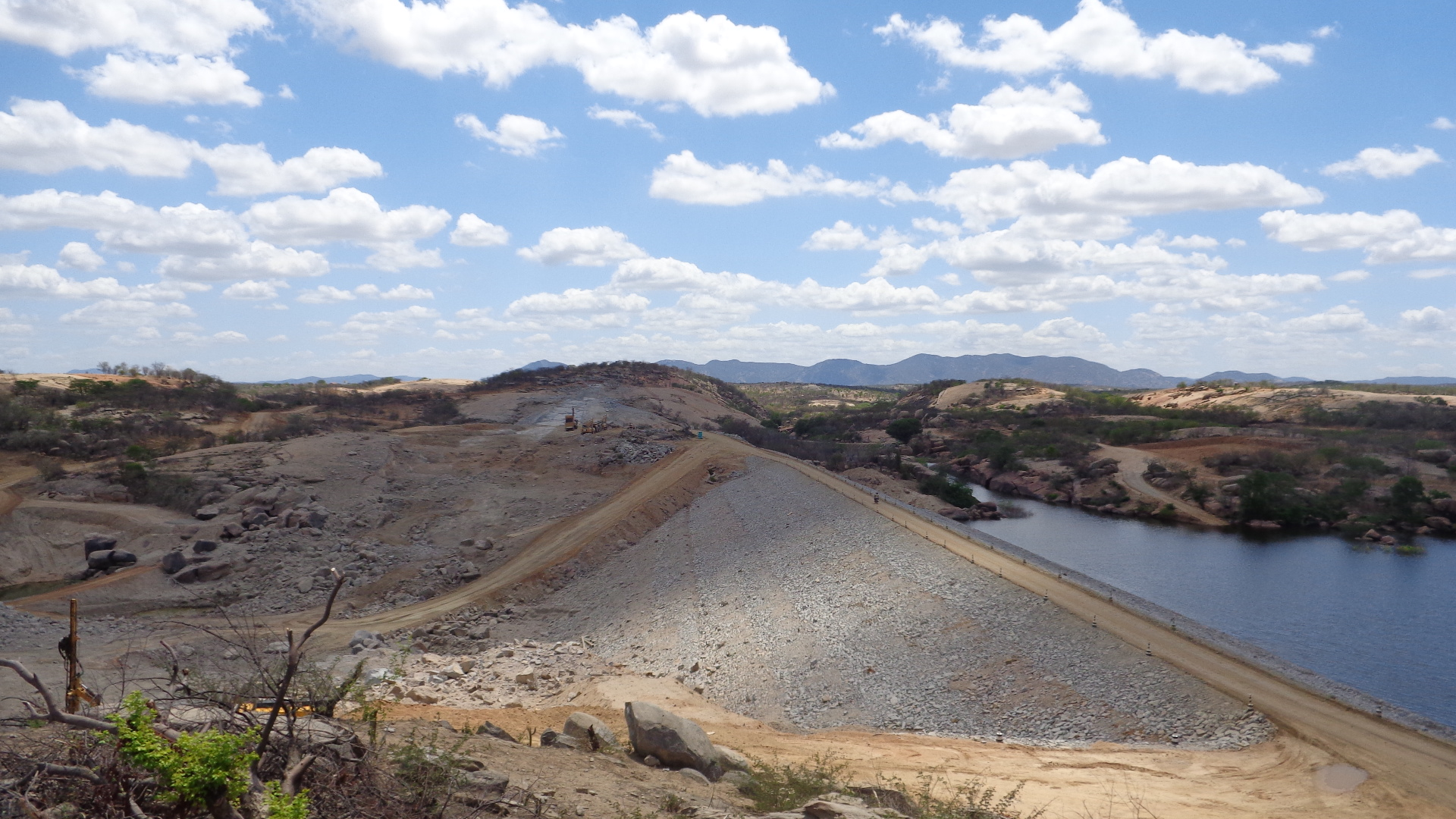
- Interactive map of Oiticica Dam
- Location: Jucurutu, Jardim de Piranhas, São Fernando
- Coordinates: 6°09′18″S 37°07′20″W
- Construction began: 2013
- Opening date: Unknown
- Construction cost: U$150 mi
- Owner: DNOCS

Reservoir
- Creates: Oiticica reservoir
- Total capacity: 556,000,000 m³

The Oiticica Dam is an earth fill embankment dam currently under construction between the rivers Seridó and Piranhas-Açu, in the southwest Brazilian state of Rio Grande do Norte. The main purpose is water storage. Its construction began in 2013 and was initially scheduled for completion in August 2015. It is projected to be the third largest man-made dam in Rio Grande do Norte. Construction suffered various delays, and by July 2019, only 74% of the work is complete.
