= Cerro Corá, Rio Grande do Norte =

Municipality in Rio Grande do Norte, Brazil

Cerro Corá
- Municipality
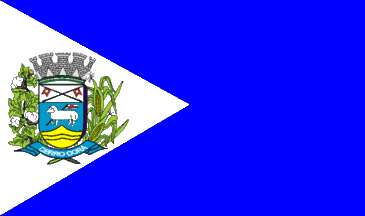
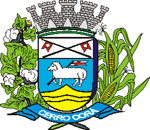
- Flag Coat of arms

- Location in Rio Grande do Norte state

- Location in Brazil
- Coordinates: 6°02′45″S 36°20′45″W
- Country: Brazil
- Region: Northeast
- State: Rio Grande do Norte

Area
  - Total: 393.573 km^{2} (151.959 sq mi)

Population (2022)
  - Total: 11,000
  - Density: 28/km^{2} (72/sq mi)
- Time zone: UTC-03:00 (BRT)

Cerro Corá is a municipality in the Brazilian state of Rio Grande do Norte. With an area of 393.573 square kilometers (151.959 sq mi), of which 1.8604 square kilometres (0.7183 sq mi) is urban, it is located 130 km from Natal, the state capital, and 1,662 km from Brasília, the federal capital. Its population in the 2022 demographic census was 11,000 inhabitants, according to the Brazilian Institute of Geography and Statistics (IBGE), ranking as the 55th most populous municipality in the state of Rio Grande do Norte.

== Geography ==
The territory of Cerro Corá covers 393.573 square kilometers (151.959 sq mi), of which 1.8604 square kilometres (0.7183 sq mi) constitutes the urban area. It sits at an average altitude of 575 meters above sea level. Cerro Corá borders these municipalities: to the north, Santana do Matos, Bodó, Lajes, and Fernando Pedroza; to the south, Currais Novos; to the east, São Tomé; and to the west, Lagoa Nova and Bodó. The city is located 130 km from the state capital Natal, and 1,662 km from the federal capital Brasília.

Under the territorial division established in 2017 by the Brazilian Institute of Geography and Statistics (IBGE), the municipality belongs to the immediate geographical region of Currais Novos, within the intermediate region of Caicó. Previously, under the microregion and mesoregion divisions, it was part of the microregion of Serra de Santana in the mesoregion of Central Potiguar.

The climate of the region is classified as semi-arid. The rainy season typically occurs from March to April. While specific rainfall data for 2007 is unavailable, the region experiences an average annual maximum temperature of 33.0 °C, a mean temperature of 27.6 °C, and a minimum of 18.0 °C. The average annual relative humidity is approximately 68%, and the region receives around 2,400 hours of sunshine per year.

== Demographics ==
In the 2022 census, the municipality had a population of 11,000 inhabitants and ranked 55th in the state that year (out of 167 municipalities), with 51.16% female and 48.84% male, resulting in a sex ratio of 95.45 (9,545 men for every 10,000 women). In the 2010 census, the municipality had 10.916 inhabitants with 43.44% living in the urban area, when it held the 56th state position. Between the 2010 and 2022 censuses, the population of Cerro Corá changed at an annual geometric growth rate of 0.06%. Regarding age group in the 2022 census, 67.69% of the inhabitants were between 15 and 64 years old, 20.02% were under fifteen, and 12.28% were 65 or older. The population density in 2022 was 27.95 inhabitants per square kilometer. There were 3,684 housing units with an average of 2.98 inhabitants per household.

The municipality's Human Development Index (HDI-M) was considered medium, according to data from the United Nations Development Programme (UNDP). According to the 2010 report published in 2013, its value was 0.607, ranking 82nd in the state and 3,984th nationally (out of 5,565 municipalities), and the Gini coefficient rose from 0.39 in 2003 to 0.54 in 2010. Considering only the longevity index, its value is 0.754, the income index is 0.573, and the education index is 0.518.
