= Microregion of Angicos =

Coordinates: 5°39′57″S 36°36′03″W

Angicos
- Microregion
- Country: Brazil
- State: Rio Grande do Norte
- Mesoregion: Central Potiguar

Angicos was a microregion in the Brazilian state of Rio Grande do Norte.

== Municipalities ==
The microregion consisted of the following municipalities:

- Afonso Bezerra
- Angicos
- Caiçara do Rio do Vento
- Fernando Pedroza
- Jardim de Angicos
- Lajes
- Pedra Preta
- Pedro Avelino
