= Potenji River =

Coordinates: 5°45′30″S 35°12′15″W

Potenji River Rio Potengi, Rio dos Camarões
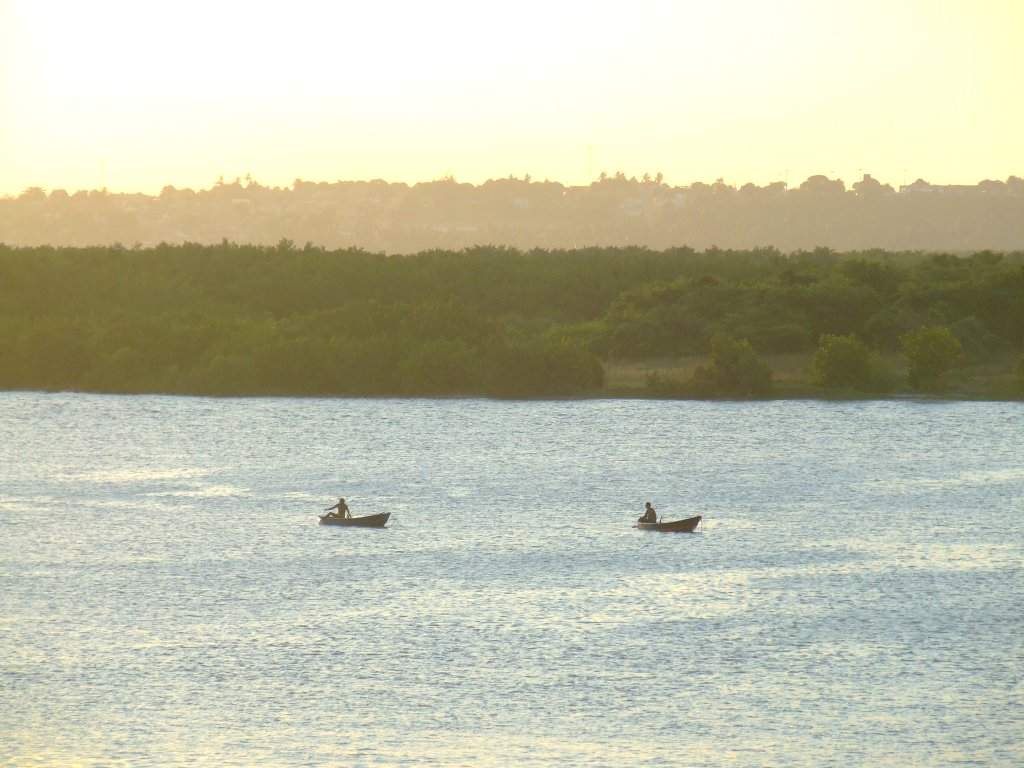
- View of Potenji River in Natal, Brazil
- Native name: Rio Potenji (Portuguese)

Location
- Country: Brazil
- State: Rio Grande do Norte

Physical characteristics
- Length: 176 km (109 mi)

The Potenji River (Portuguese: Rio Potenji), meaning "river of the shrimps" in Tupi, is the principal river in the state of Rio Grande do Norte (Brazil). Its delta, that discharges in the coastline of Natal, was soon discovered by the first colonists that used to penetrate into the territory with their vessels. They named the river Rio Grande (which means "Big River" in English) because of its large channel and extension, being the origin of the name of the "capitania hereditária" (administrative division of Brazil during the colonial period whose possession was inherited by the descendants) of Rio Grande do Norte of that time.

The river's headwaters are located in Serra de Santana at the municipality of Cerro Corá and its mouth is located at the city of Natal, where it discharges into the Atlantic Ocean. Forte dos Reis Magos, founded in 1599, is built at the right bank of the river at its mouth.

In Natal, the river marks the division between the North Region and the rest of the city.

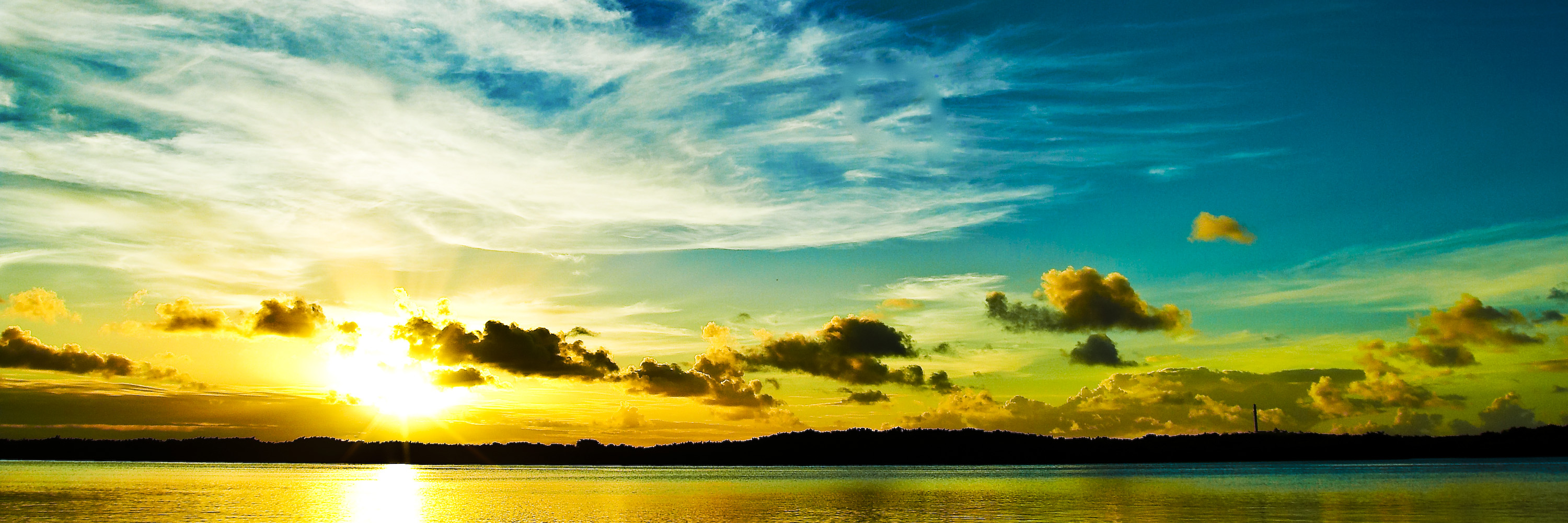
Skyline of Potenji River
