= Seridó Ecological Station =

Protected area in Rio Grande do Norte, Brazil

- Estação Ecológica do Seridó
- IUCN category Ia (strict nature reserve)
- Location within Brazil
- Nearest city: Caicó, Rio Grande do Norte
- Coordinates: 6°33′56″S 37°16′39″W
- Area: 1,163 hectares (2,870 acres)
- Designation: Ecological station
- Created: 31 May 1982

Seridó Ecological Station (Portuguese: Estação Ecológica do Seridó) is a hot, semi-arid ecological station in the state of Rio Grande do Norte, Brazil.

== Location ==
The station was created on 31 May 1982 to preserve the Caatinga ecosystem, with a semi-arid climate and vegetation typical of the north eastern interior. It is in the Serra Negra do Norte municipality of the state of Rio Grande do Norte. The Seridó Ecological Station covers 1,163 hectares (2,870 acres) and is near to the city of Caicó. It is a federal conservation unit managed by the Chico Mendes Institute for Biodiversity Conservation.

== Environment ==
The climate is hot and semi-arid, with temperatures from 20 to 32 °C (68 to 90 °F) and average annual rainfall of 497 millimetres (19.6 in). Terrain is undulating, with average elevation of 200 metres (660 ft). The Serra Verde rises to 386 metres (1,266 ft) in the north. Vegetation is dry, sparse scrub, with isolated bushes and trees up to 2 metres (6 ft 7 in) high. There are relatively few mammals, which include fox, margay and armadillo. 57 species of bird have been observed.

== Status ==
The Ecological Station is a "strict nature reserve" under IUCN protected area category Ia. The purpose is to conserve nature and support scientific research. Poaching is an issue, as are sporadic invasions of cattle from neighbouring farms.

== Sources ==
- Esec do Seridó (in Portuguese), Chico Mendes Institute for Biodiversity Conservation
- Estação Ecológica do Seridó (in Portuguese), Ambiente Brasil, 18 May 2010
- Publicado livro com pesquisas sobre a caatinga na ESEC do Seridó (in Portuguese), Chico Mendes Institute for Biodiversity Conservation, 19 July 2011
- Unidade de Conservação: Estação Ecológica do Seridó (in Portuguese), MMA: Ministério do Meio Ambiente
