= São Fernando =

Municipality in Rio Grande do Norte, Brazil

- The Municipality of São Fernando
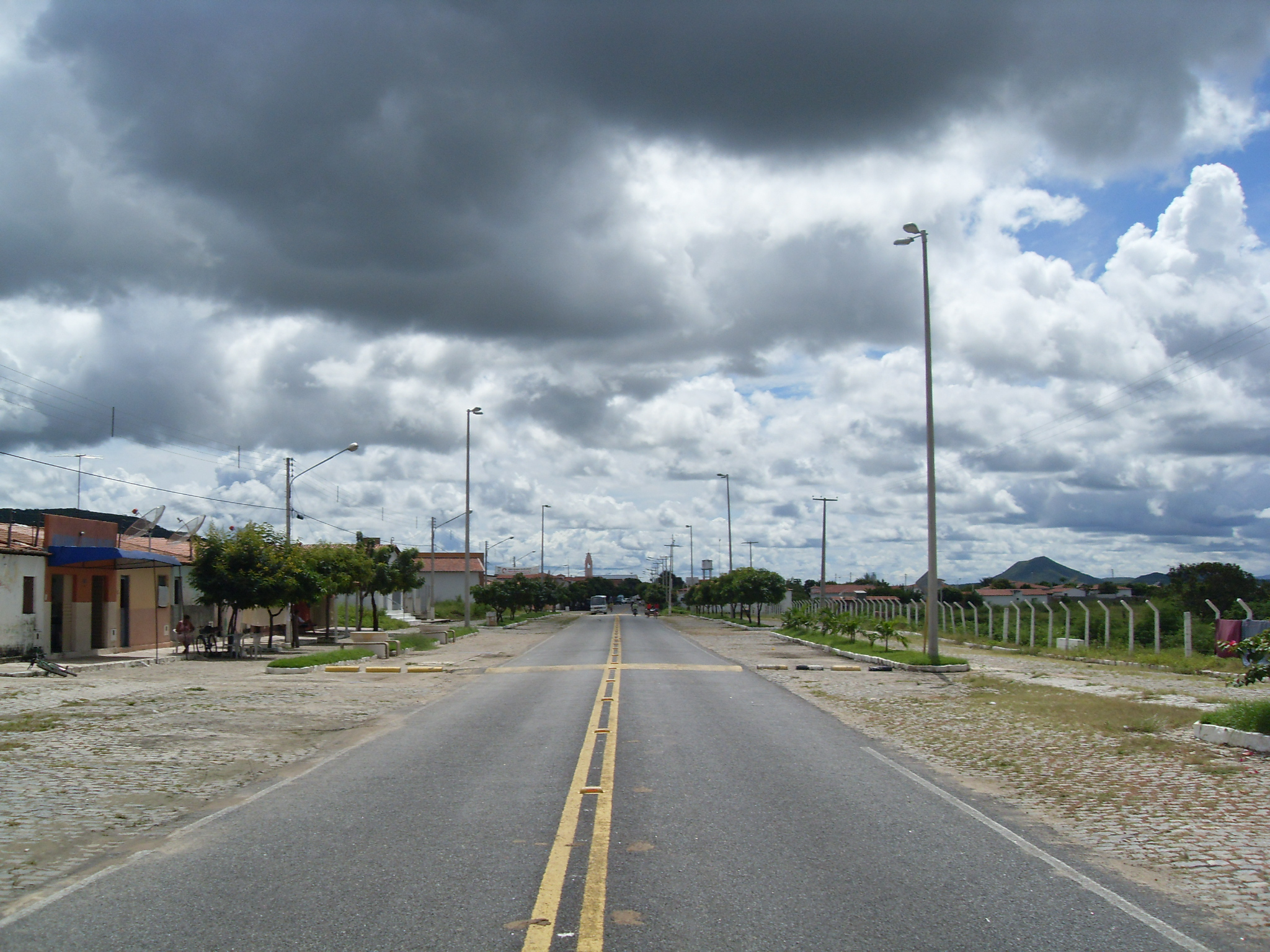
- City input

- Flag Coat of arms

- Location of São Fernando in Rio Grande do Norte

- Location of São Fernando in Brazil
- Coordinates: 06°22′33″S 37°11′02″W
- Country: Brazil
- Region: Nordeste
- State: Rio Grande do Norte
- Mesoregion: Seridó Ocitental
- Founded: 1872

Area
  - Total: 156,146 sq mi (404,415 km^{2})
- Elevation: 660 ft (200 m)

Population (2020)
  - Total: 3,595
  - Density: 21.8/sq mi (8.41/km^{2})
- Time zone: UTC−3 (BRT)
- Postal Code: 59327-000
- Website: www.saofernando.rn.gov.br

São Fernando is a city in the Brazilian state of Rio Grande do Norte, is located in the heart of Seridó Potiguar to 6 23'de south latitude and 37 ° 11 'west longitude. It was founded in 1872 under the name Pascoal, probably because of an existing hill near the present village. He belonged to the municipality of Caicó.It was a small town with mostly poor people. 1 June 1886 was considered District of Peace in 1953 and elevated to the category of town. He remained in this condition until 31 December 1958, when under the 2333 Act, a municipality has emancipated, dismembered the city of Caico, having as neighbors to the east Caicó, west of Jardim de Piranhas, north Timbaúba dos Batistas and south Jucurutu .

== Vegetation ==
The vegetation is give as Caatinga (Tupi: caa (kills) + tinga (white) = white forest) - drier vegetation character, with plenty of cacti and plants bearing lower and spread. Among other species stand out jurema black mufumbo, faveleiro, quince, and xique-xique facheiro. The vegetation occupies 10% of the municipal territory inserted in the second Semi Arid region where more if it rains. According to the National Plan to Combat Desertification - PNCD, which defines desertification as land degradation in arid, semi-arid and dry sub-humid areas resulting from various factors such as climate change, human activities and excessive use of soil without moderation. The municipality of San Fernando is inserted into the area susceptible to desertification in Very Serious category, as well as the entire region Seridó where it is inserted.
