= Angicos =

Municipality in Rio Grande do Norte, Brazil

- Municipality
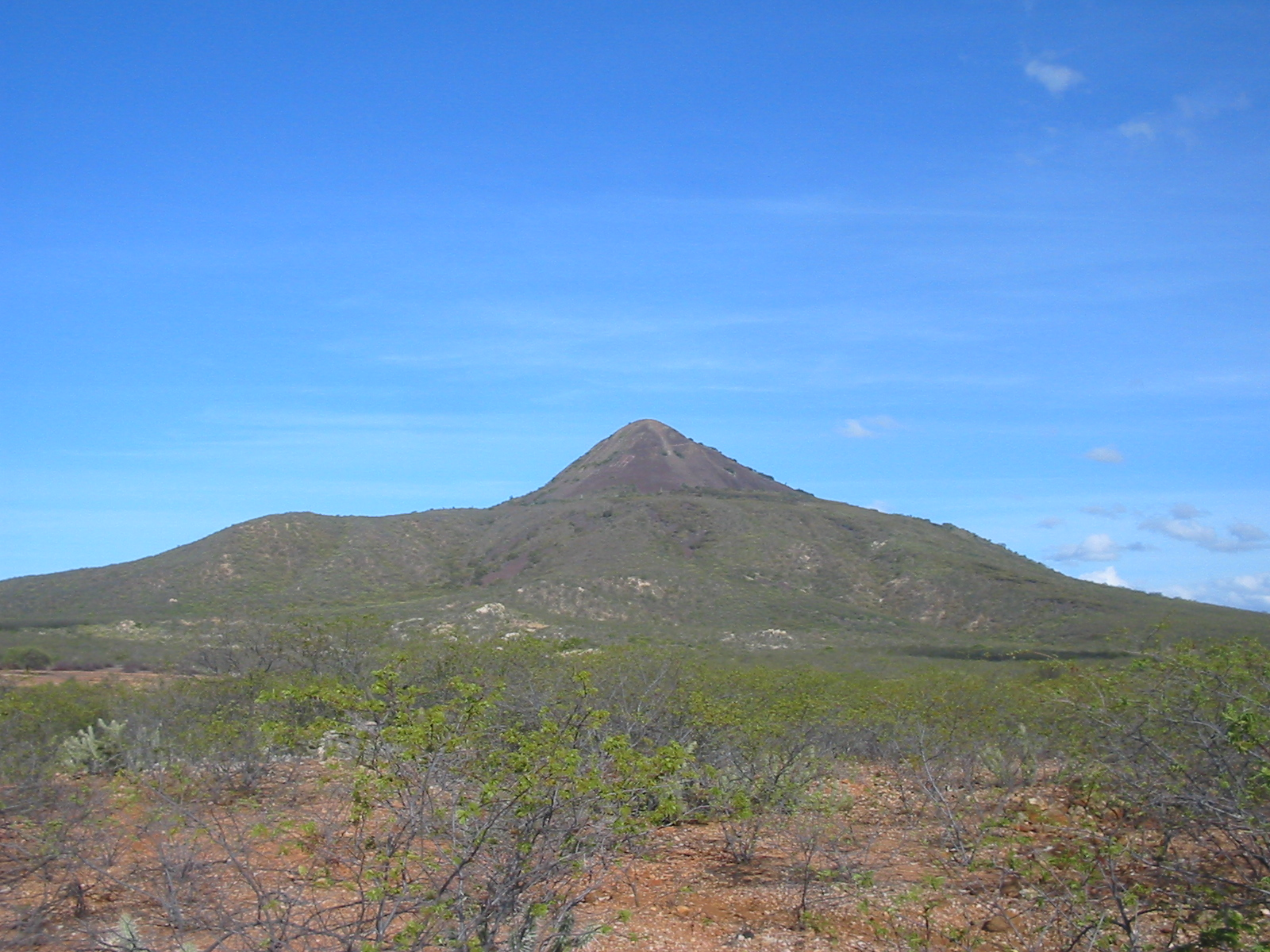
- Pico do Cabugi

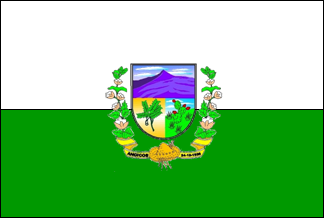
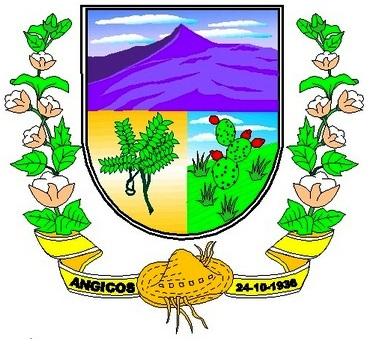
- Flag Coat of arms

- Coordinates: 5.66583°S 36.6008°W
- Country: Brazil
- Region: Nordeste
- State: Rio Grande do Norte
- Mesoregion: Central Potiguar

Area
  - Total: 286.354 sq mi (741.654 km^{2})

Population (2022)
  - Total: 11,632
  - Density: 41/sq mi (16/km^{2})
- Time zone: UTC -3

Angicos is a municipality in the state of Rio Grande do Norte in the Northeast region of Brazil. With an area of 741.582 square kilometers (286.326 sq mi), of which 3.4712 square kilometres (1.3402 sq mi) is urban, it is located 155 km from Natal, the state capital, and 1,671 km from Brasília, the federal capital. Its population in the 2022 demographic census was 11,632 inhabitants, according to the Brazilian Institute of Geography and Statistics (IBGE), ranking as the 49th most populous municipality in the state of Rio Grande do Norte.

== Geography ==
The territory of Angicos covers 741.582 square kilometers (286.326 sq mi), of which 3.4712 square kilometres (1.3402 sq mi) constitutes the urban area. It sits at an average altitude of 110 meters above sea level. Angicos borders these municipalities: to the north, Afonso Bezerra and Pedro Avelino; to the south, Santana do Matos and Fernando Pedroza; to the east, Pedro Velho, Pedro Avelino again, and Lajes; and to the west, Itajá and Ipanguaçu. The city is located 155 km from the state capital Natal, and 1,671 km from the federal capital Brasília.

Under the territorial division established in 2017 by the Brazilian Institute of Geography and Statistics (IBGE), the municipality belongs to the immediate geographical region of Açu, within the intermediate region of Mossoró. Previously, under the microregion and mesoregion divisions, it was part of the microregion of Angicos in the mesoregion of Central Potiguar.

== Demographics ==
In the 2022 census, the municipality had a population of 11,632 inhabitants and ranked only 49th in the state that year (out of 167 municipalities), with 51.68% female and 48.32% male, resulting in a sex ratio of 93.51 (9,351 men for every 10,000 women), compared to 11,549 inhabitants in the 2010 census (87.32% living in the urban area), when it held the 51st state position. Between the 2010 and 2022 censuses, the population of Angicos changed at an annual geometric growth rate of 0.06%. Regarding age group in the 2022 census, 69.31% of the inhabitants were between 15 and 64 years old, 18.64% were under fifteen, and 12.02% were 65 or older. The population density in 2022 was 15.69 inhabitants per square kilometer, with an average of 2.94 inhabitants per household.

The municipality's Human Development Index (HDI-M) is considered medium, according to data from the United Nations Development Programme. According to the 2010 report published in 2013, its value was 0.624, ranking 16th in the state and 2,870th nationally (out of 5,565 municipalities), and the Gini coefficient rose from 0.4 in 2003 to 0.53 in 2010. Considering only the longevity index, its value is 0.756, the income index is 0.606, and the education index is 0.53.

== See also ==
- List of municipalities in Rio Grande do Norte
