= Ricardo Silva (footballer, born 1992) =

Brazilian footballer

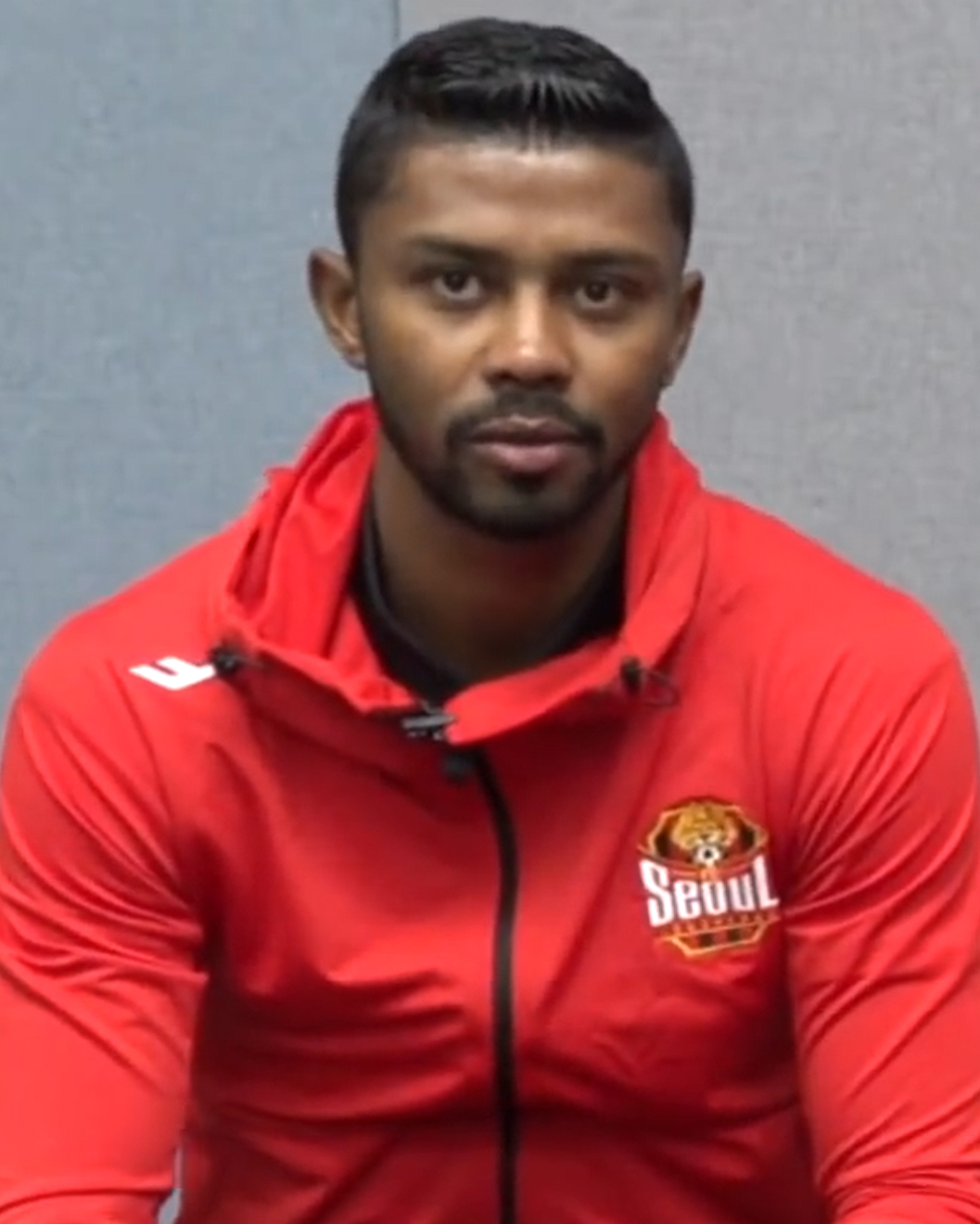
- Silva in 2022

Personal information
- Full name: Ricardo César Dantas da Silva
- Date of birth: 13 August 1992 (age 34)
- Place of birth: São José do Seridó, Brazil
- Height: 1.90 m (6 ft 3 in)
- Position: Centre back

Team information
- Current team: América Mineiro
- Number: 45

Senior career*
Years	Team	Apps	(Gls)
2010–2011	América de Natal		
2010	→ Mogi Mirim (loan)		
2012–2014	Ceará	48	(0)
2014	→ Atlético Paranaense (loan)	9	(1)
2015–2017	Atlético Paranaense	7	(0)
2016–2017	→ Atlético Goianiense (loan)	24	(1)
2018–2020	Ituano	33	(0)
2018	→ América Mineiro (loan)	1	(0)
2019	→ América Mineiro (loan)	29	(5)
2020–2021	Operário Ferroviário	26	(0)
2021	América Mineiro	32	(1)
2022	FC Seoul	1	(0)
2023–	América Mineiro	146	(3)
- * Club domestic league appearances and goals as of 18 November 2026

Ricardo César Dantas Silva (born 13 August 1992), known as Ricardo Silva, is a Brazilian footballer who plays as a central defender for América Mineiro.

== Club career ==
Born in São José do Seridó, Rio Grande do Norte, Ricardo Silva made his senior debuts with Mogi Mirim in 2010, on loan from América-RN. In 2012, he moved to Ceará, and made his professional debut on 18 May 2012, starting in a 1–2 home loss against América-MG for the Série B championship.

On 7 January 2014 Ricardo Silva moved to Série A club Atlético Paranaense, in a season-long loan deal. He made his debut in the competition only on 7 December, starting and scoring his side's only in a 1–1 away draw against Palmeiras.

On 9 December 2014 Furacão bought Ricardo Silva outright.

On 6 February 2022, FC Seoul announced that Ricardo Silva had a signed contract, a 2 year deal until 2023.

On 3 May 2022, FC Seoul announced that Ricardo's contract was officially terminated by mutual consent due to health issue.

== Honours ==
Ceará

- Campeonato Cearense: 2012, 2013

Atlético Paranaense

- Campeonato Paranaense: 2016

Atlético Goianiense

- Campeonato Brasileiro Série B: 2016
