= Oiticica =

Oiticica may refer to:

== People ==
- Hélio Oiticica (1937–1980), Brazilian artist
- José Oiticica (1882–1957), Brazilian anarchist
- Christina Oiticica (born 1951), Brazilian artist

== Other uses ==
- Oiticica Dam, in Rio Grande do Norte, Brazil
- Oiticica, common name for the tree Microdesmia rigida
