= Forte dos Reis Magos =

Fortress in Natal, Brazil

- Natal, Rio Grande do Norte in Brazil
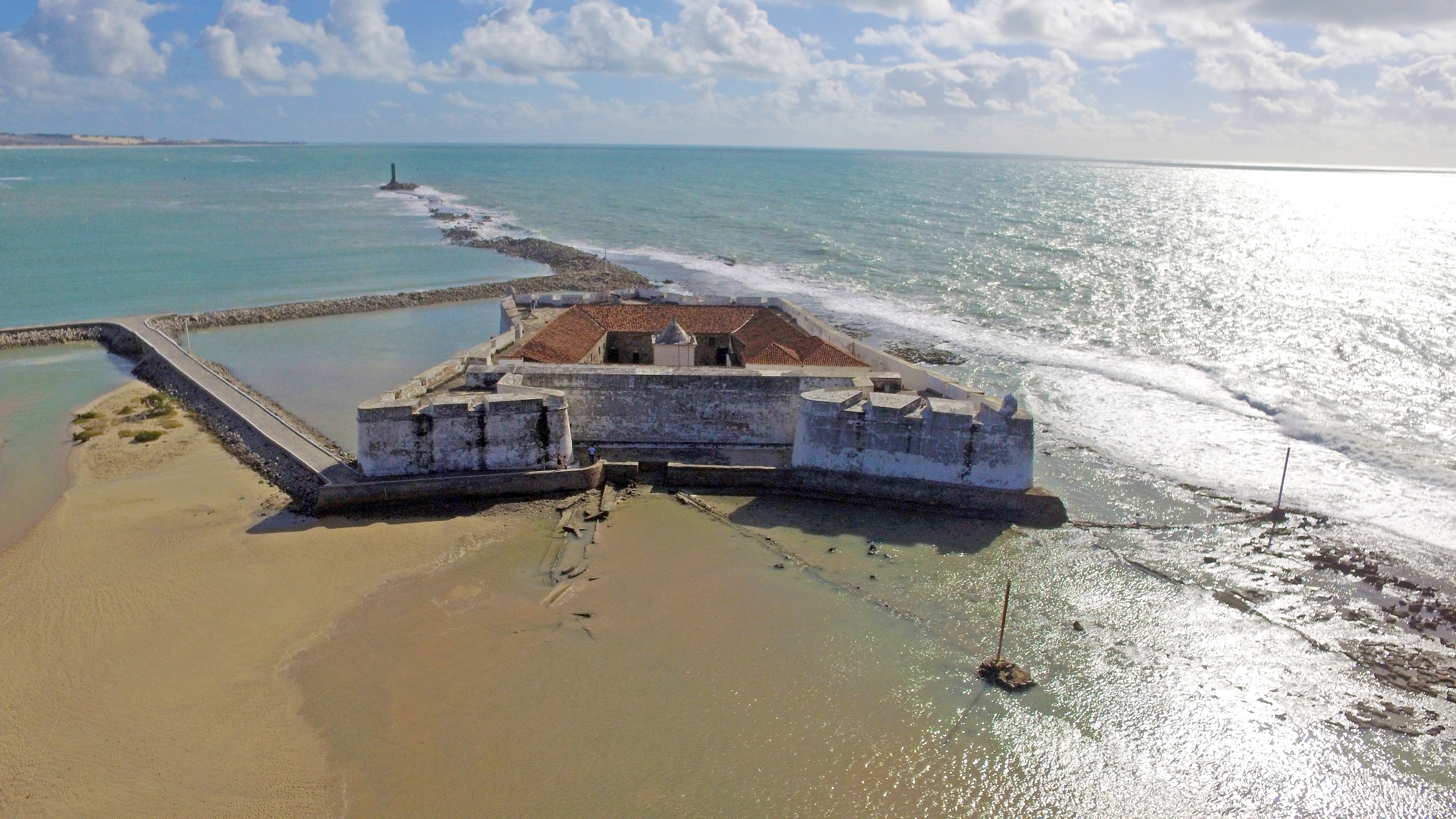
- Forte dos Reis Magos

Location
- Location of Forte dos Reis Magos in Brazil
- Coordinates: 5.756389°S 35.194722°W -->

Site history
- Built: 1599

National Historic Heritage of Brazil
- Designated: 1949
- Reference no.: 394

The Forte dos Reis Magos or Fortaleza dos Reis Magos (Fortress of the Three Wise Men) is a fortress located in the city of Natal in the Brazilian state of Rio Grande do Norte.

The fortress was the first milestone of the city – founded on 25 December 1599 – on the right side of the bar of the Potenji River (today near the Newton Navarro Bridge). It received its name based on the date of commencement of its construction, 6 January 1598, at Epiphany Catholic calendar.

Its original construction was in earth to a design of Father Gaspar Samperes. By 1608 it was in need of repair and was rebuilt in stone. The reconstructed fort was completed in 1614 with input from Portuguese engineer Francisco Frias de Mesquita. The completed works have similarities to the Forte Jesus de Mombaça in East Africa, whose dimensions have been compared to the Vitruvian ideals of the human body. The Forte dos Reis Magos is of simpler appearance than its African counterpart.
