= Apertados Canyon =

Landform in Brazil's Chapéu mountains

Coordinates: 6.3355°S 36.4881°W

Apertados Canyon (Portuguese: Canyon dos Apertados) is a canyon located in Currais Novos, Rio Grande do Norte, Brazil. The Picuí and Currais Novos Rivers carved the canyon through the granite bedrock of the Chapéu mountains along the border with the state of Paraíba.

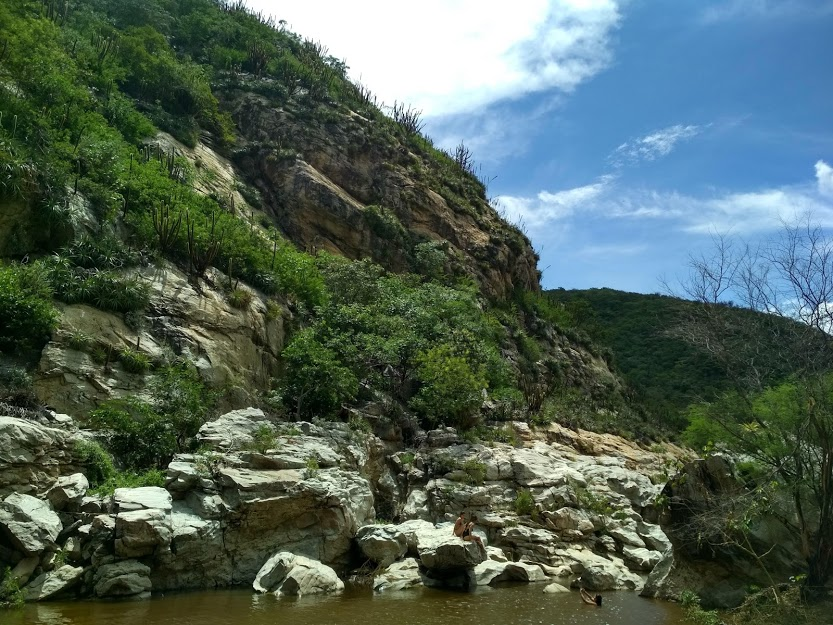
Apertados Canyon
