= Pico do Cabugi =

Extinct Brazilian volcano

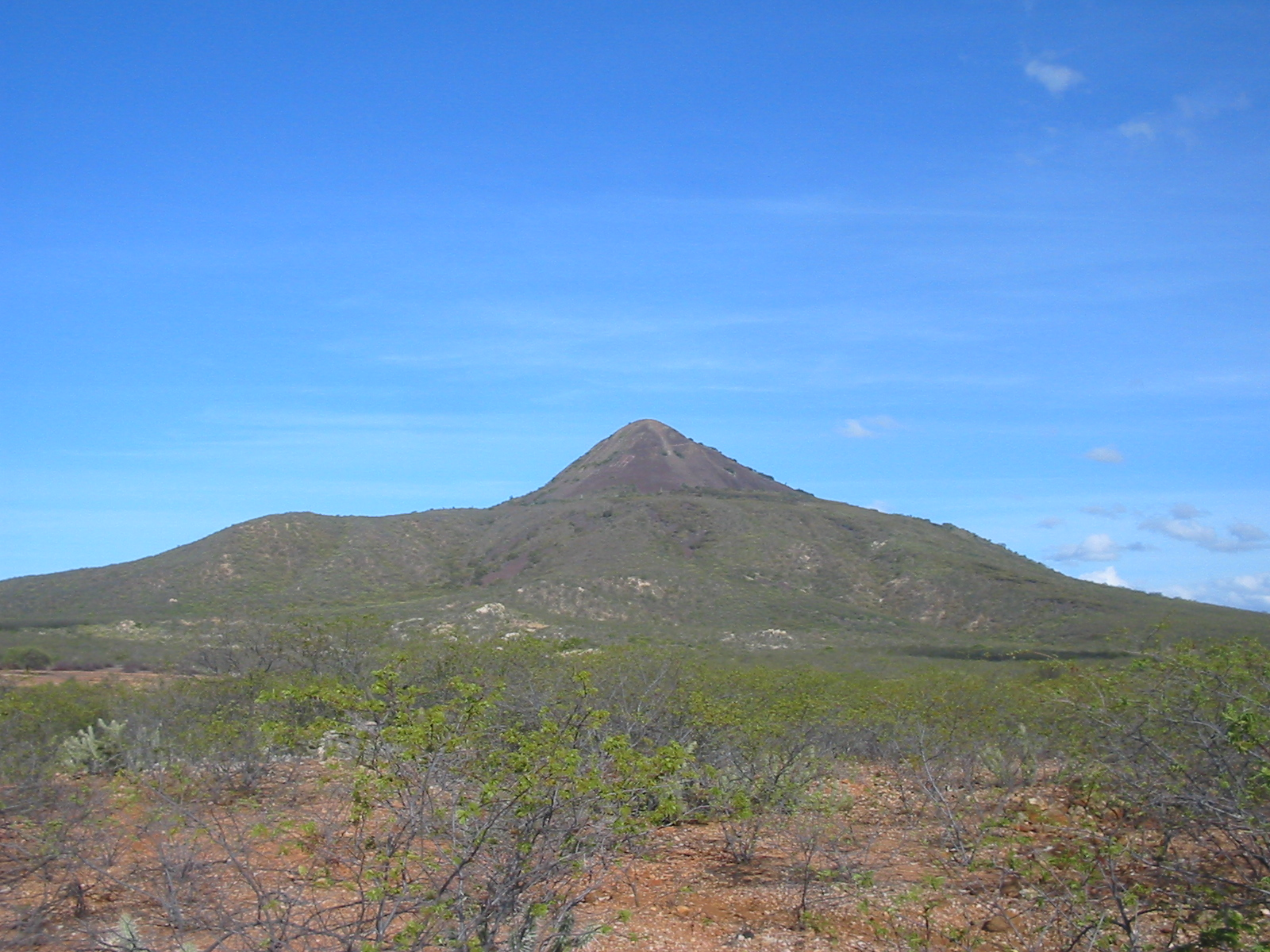
- Pico do Cabugi

Highest point
- Elevation: 590 m (1,940 ft)
- Coordinates: 05°42′22″S 36°19′15″W

Geography
- Location within Brazil
- Location: State of Rio Grande do Norte, Brazil
- Parent range: Serra do Cabugi

The Pico do Cabugi, also known as the Serra do Cabuji or Serrote da Itaretama, is the only extinct volcano in Brazil which preserves its original form. It is 590 meters high and is located in the Cabugi Ecological State Park in the municipality of Angicos in the state of Rio Grande do Norte.

Composed mainly of basaltic alkaline intrusive rocks, this volcano was the result of a major geological upheaval in the tertiary era which were responsible for various volcanic cones in the rocky state of Rio Grande do Norte. They have been dated using radioactive isotopes as the most recent of Brazilian igneous rocks (± 19 million years). The presence of small xenoliths indicate that these rocks have originated at a great depth (about 60 km).

The researcher Lenine Pinto argues that when Brazil was first discovered by Pedro Álvares Cabral, it was Pico do Cabugi that he first saw and not Monte Pascoal.
