= Newton Navarro Bridge =

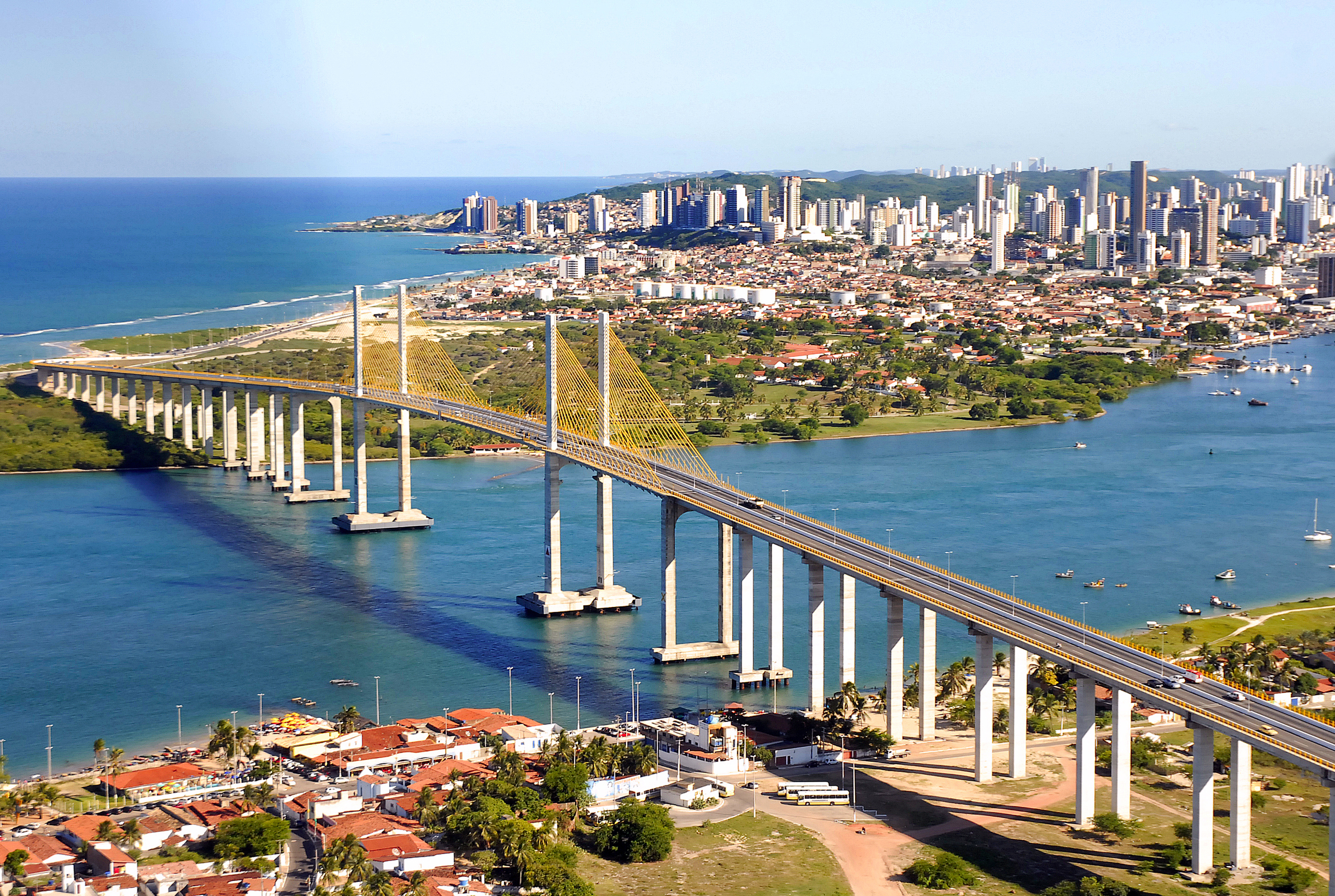
- Coordinates: 5°45′23″S 35°12′9″W
- Carries: Vehicle, 4 lanes
- Crosses: Potengi River
- Locale: Natal, Brazil
- Official name: Bridge of All Newton Navarro

Characteristics
- Design: Cable-stayed bridge
- Total length: 1781.6 m
- Width: 22 m
- Height: 103.45 m
- Longest span: 212 m
- Clearance below: 55.1 m

History
- Designer: Mario de Miranda
- Construction start: October 24, 2004
- Construction end: November 17, 2007
- Construction cost: US$80 million
- Opened: November 21, 2007

Statistics
- Daily traffic: 25,000

Location
- Interactive map of Newton Navarro Bridge

The Newton Navarro Bridge is a cable-stayed bridge located in Natal, the capital of the Brazilian state of Rio Grande do Norte. It connects the North Zone and the cities of the north coast to the South Zone and the other regions of the city across the Potengi River. It is one of the largest cable-stayed bridges in Brazil, and was built from a design by the Italian engineer Mario de Miranda. It is named for Newton Navarro, a local artist.

The bridges eases traffic on Igapó Bridge and provides access to the Greater Natal International Airport and its adjacent areas. It also increases the flow of tourism on the north coast and improves access to the inhabitants of the North Zone to the downtown and the main zones.
