= Várzea, Paraíba =

Coordinates: 6°46′19″S 36°59′31″W

- Municipality
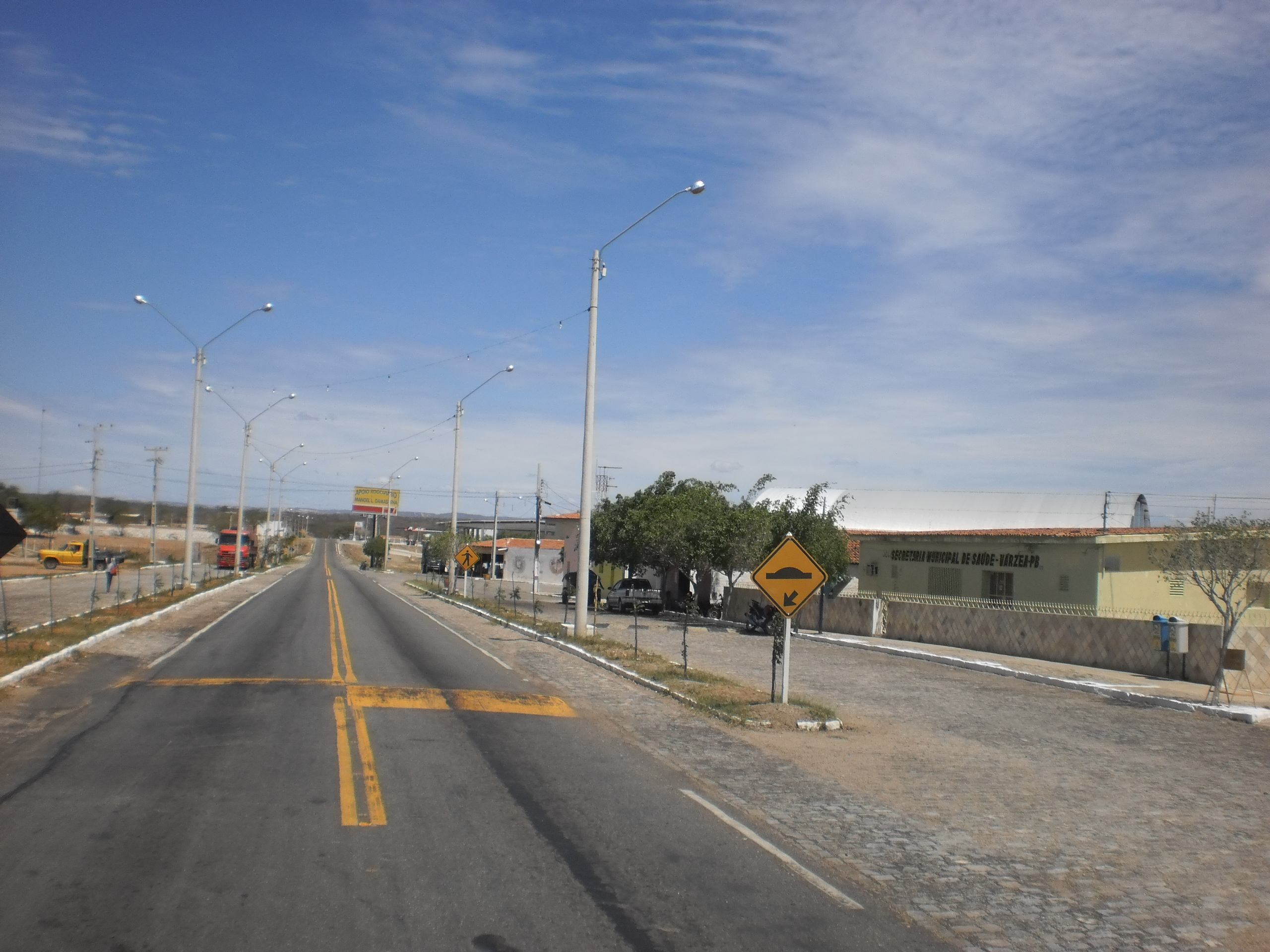
- A photo of PB-233 in Várzea, Paraíba, Brazil. Departure to Santa Luzia-PB.

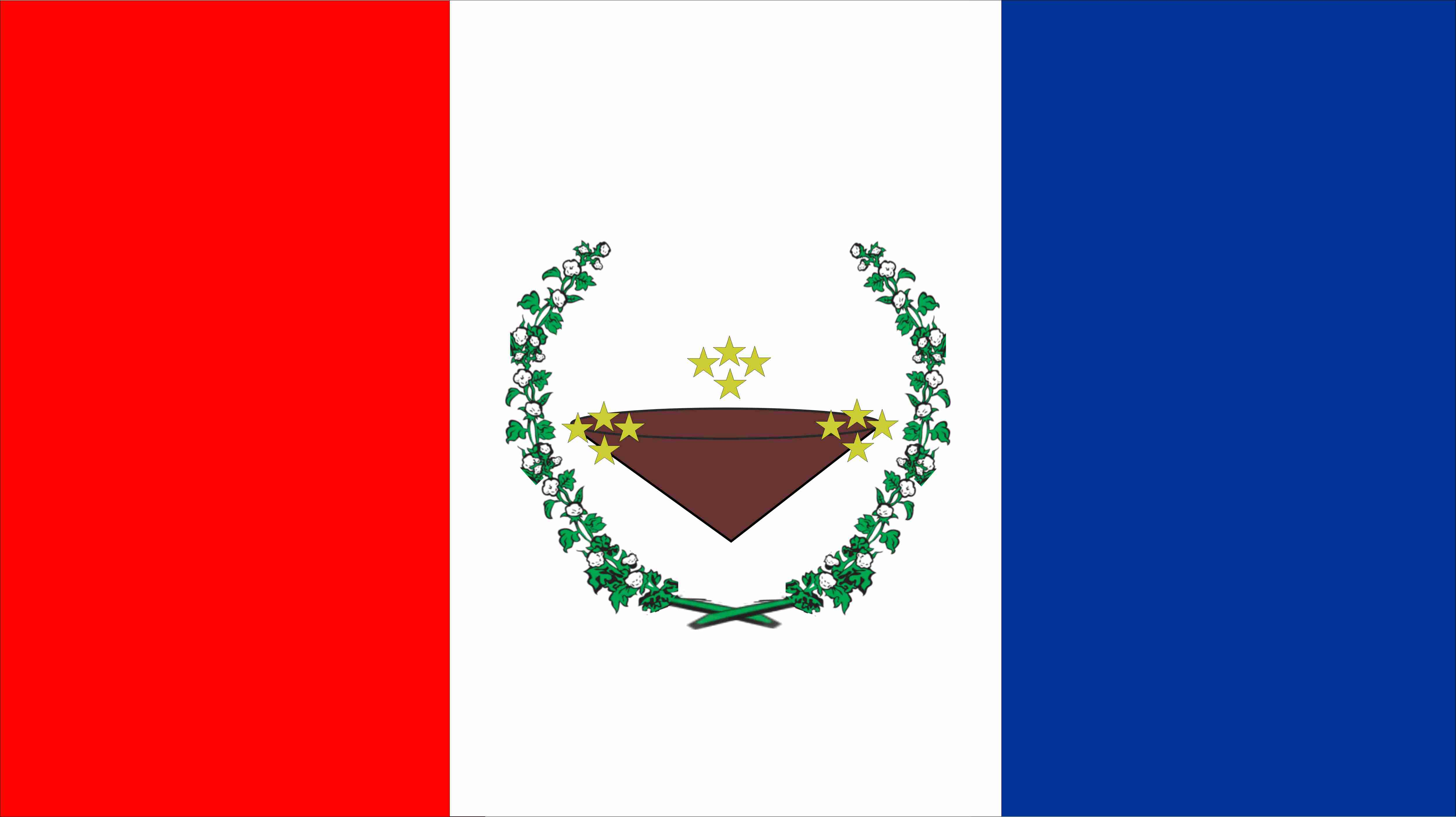
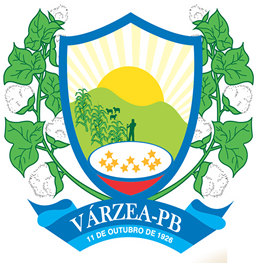
- Flag Coat of arms
- Interactive map of Várzea, Paraíba
- Country: Brazil
- Region: Northeast
- State: Paraíba
- Mesoregion: Boborema

Population (2020)
  - Total: 2,841
- Time zone: UTC−3 (BRT)

Várzea (Central northeastern portuguese pronunciation: [ˈvaɦzjɐ]) is a municipality in the state of Paraíba in the Northeast Region of Brazil.

== See also ==
- List of municipalities in Paraíba
