= Central Potiguar =

Coordinates: 5°39′57″S 36°36′03″W

- Mesoregion
- Country: Brazil
- State: Rio Grande do Norte

Central Potiguar is the former mesoregion in the Brazilian state of Rio Grande do Norte.

== Microregions ==
- Angicos
- Macau
- Seridó Ocidental
- Seridó Oriental
- Serra de Santana
