= Serra Negra do Norte =

Municipality in Rio Grande do Norte, Brazil

Coordinates: 6°40′S 37°24′W

- Municipality
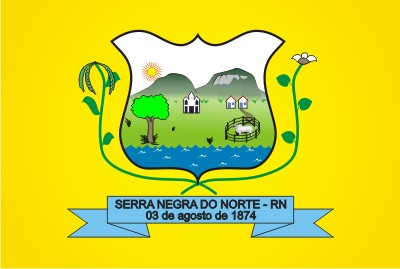
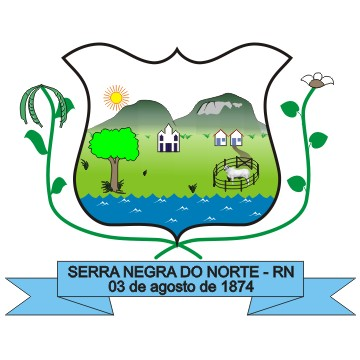
- Flag Coat of arms
- Interactive map of Serra Negra do Norte
- Country: Brazil
- Region: Nordeste
- State: Rio Grande do Norte
- Mesoregion: Central Potiguar

Population (2020)
  - Total: 8,092
- Time zone: UTC−3 (BRT)

Serra Negra do Norte is a Brazilian municipality in the interior of the state of Rio Grande do Norte, located southwest of the state capital, 319 miles away. It occupies an area of 562 km^{2}, and its population, in the 2018 census, was 8,065 inhabitants, according to the Brazilian Institute of Geography and Statistics, making it the 84th most populous municipality in the state (in 167 municipalities).

The municipality contains the Seridó Ecological Station.

== City history ==
The history of Serra Negra do Norte begins at the time of Colonial Brazil, when a large lot was donated to Francisco de Oliveira Toledo.

The construction of this chapel was the starting point for the accelerated population growth in Serra Negra on the banks of the Espinharas River.

On September 1, 1858, a provincial law elevates the locality of Serra Negra to the category of village, being later elevated to the category of municipality, only sixteen years later, on August 3, 1874, dismembering from Caicó.

In the 20th century, the seat of the municipality was from the 20th century Serra Negra to São João Sabugi. Just a year and two later, the headquarters returned months ago to Serra Negra. Five years later, the village of Serra Negra was elevated to the category of city, being, at the same time, created in the district of São João do Sabugi.

Thus, the municipality started to be formed by the districts of Serra Negra do Norte and São João do Sabugi. In 1943, a state law changed the name of the municipality from «Serra Negra» to «Serra Negra do Norte», a nomenclature that it maintains to this day. In 1948, the district of São João do Sabugi is emancipated from Serra Negra do Norte and becomes a new municipality in Potiguar.

On the 9th of the 2007 election, a few months of election for Serra Negra do Norte were elected for the municipal election of the new flag.
