= Cruzeta =

Municipality in Rio Grande do Norte, Brazil

- Municipality
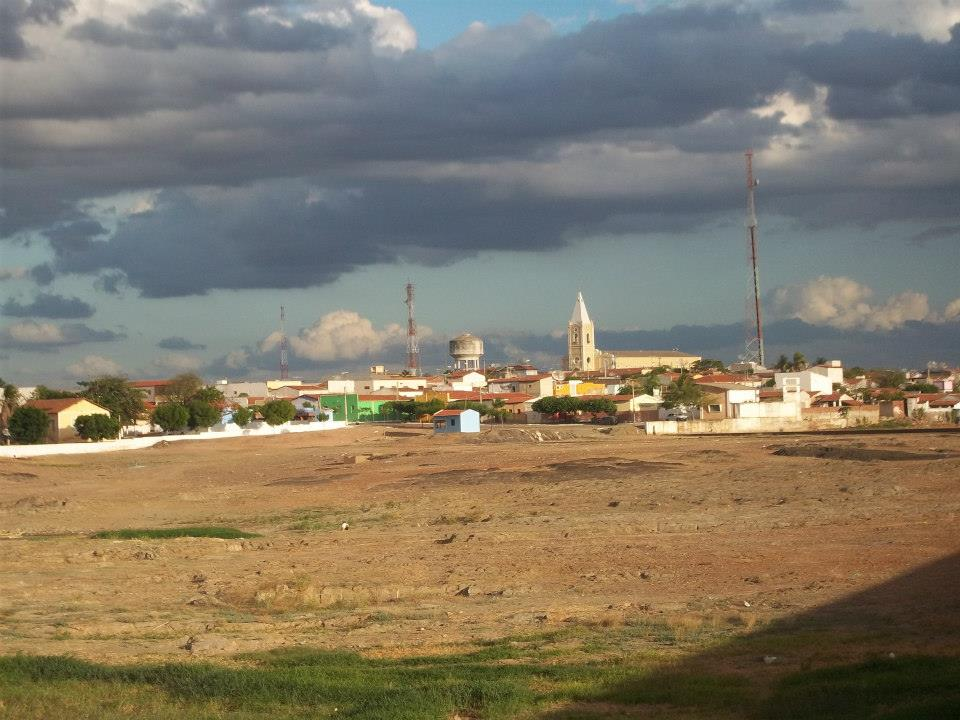

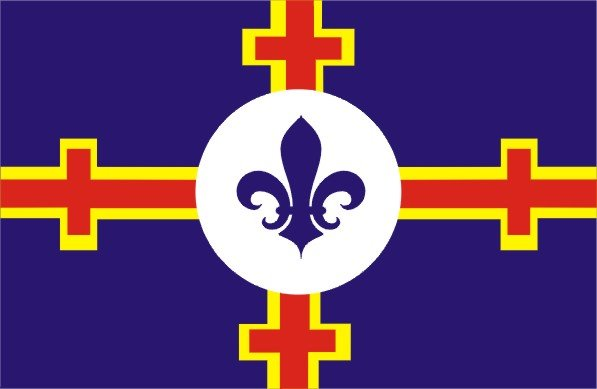
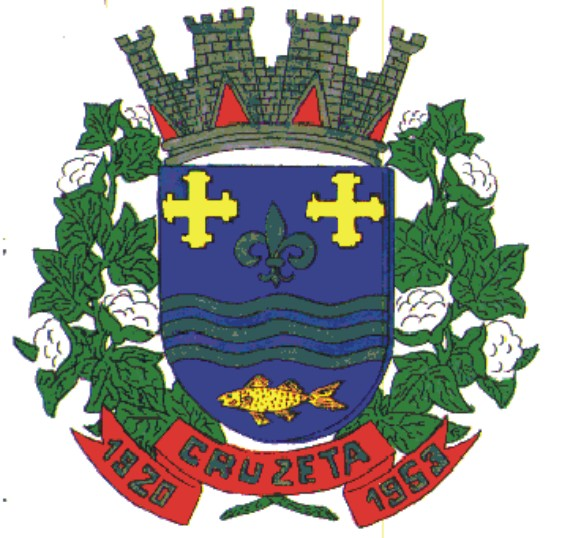
- Flag Coat of arms

- Location in Brazil
- Coordinates: 6.41194°S 36.79°W
- Country: Brazil
- Region: Nordeste
- State: Rio Grande do Norte
- Mesoregion: Central Potiguar

Population (2020)
  - Total: 7,983
- Time zone: UTC -3

Cruzeta is a municipality in the state of Rio Grande do Norte in the Northeast region of Brazil.

== Climate ==
Cruzeta experiences a hot semi-arid climate (Köppen: BSh) with hot temperatures throughout the year. January to May has a moderately rainy wet season, while the rest of the year is dry.

Climate data for Cruzeta (1991–2020)
Month	Jan	Feb	Mar	Apr	May	Jun	Jul	Aug	Sep	Oct	Nov	Dec	Year
Mean daily maximum °C (°F)	34.9 (94.8)	34.6 (94.3)	34.0 (93.2)	33.0 (91.4)	32.8 (91.0)	31.7 (89.1)	31.9 (89.4)	33.0 (91.4)	34.4 (93.9)	35.6 (96.1)	36.0 (96.8)	35.8 (96.4)	34.0 (93.2)
Daily mean °C (°F)	28.4 (83.1)	28.2 (82.8)	27.8 (82.0)	27.3 (81.1)	27.0 (80.6)	26.1 (79.0)	25.9 (78.6)	26.4 (79.5)	27.3 (81.1)	28.2 (82.8)	28.7 (83.7)	28.8 (83.8)	27.5 (81.5)
Mean daily minimum °C (°F)	23.6 (74.5)	23.4 (74.1)	23.3 (73.9)	23.1 (73.6)	22.5 (72.5)	21.6 (70.9)	21.1 (70.0)	21.2 (70.2)	21.9 (71.4)	23.0 (73.4)	23.4 (74.1)	23.7 (74.7)	22.7 (72.9)
Average precipitation mm (inches)	86.1 (3.39)	90.1 (3.55)	146.3 (5.76)	136.0 (5.35)	76.3 (3.00)	38.7 (1.52)	17.1 (0.67)	9.7 (0.38)	2.7 (0.11)	4.2 (0.17)	2.5 (0.10)	26.1 (1.03)	635.8 (25.03)
Average precipitation days (≥ 1.0 mm)	5.4	6.5	—	10.0	6.9	4.2	2.8	1.3	—	0.4	0.6	1.9	—
Average relative humidity (%)	60.8	63.9	65.9	70.2	67.3	64.7	60.0	55.0	51.3	50.3	49.8	52.2	59.3
Average dew point °C (°F)	19.8 (67.6)	20.3 (68.5)	21.1 (70.0)	21.5 (70.7)	20.6 (69.1)	19.3 (66.7)	18.0 (64.4)	17.1 (62.8)	16.9 (62.4)	17.3 (63.1)	17.6 (63.7)	18.4 (65.1)	19.0 (66.2)
Source: NOAA

== See also ==
- List of municipalities in Rio Grande do Norte
