= Florânia =

Municipality in Rio Grande do Norte, Brazil

- Municipality
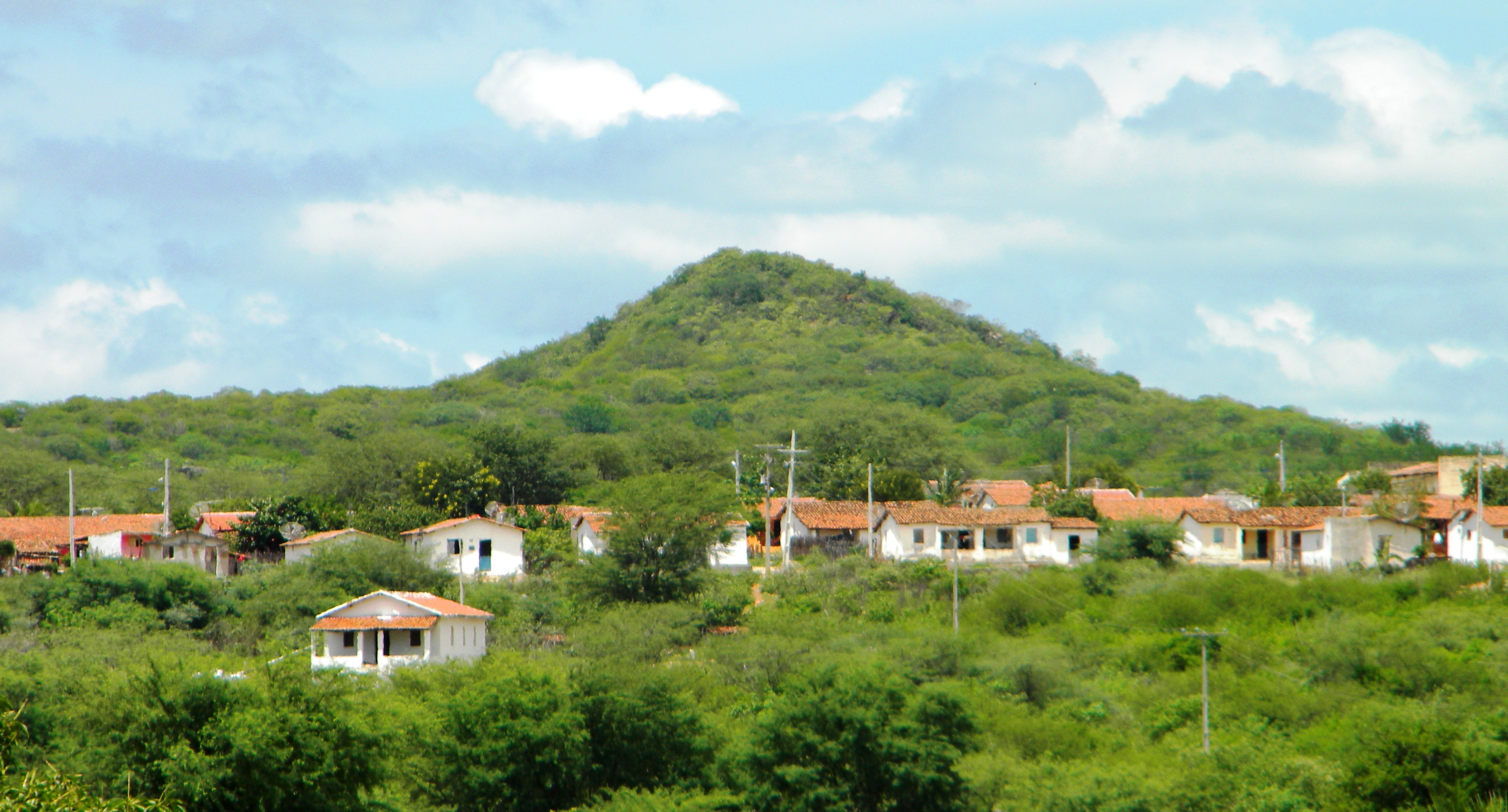

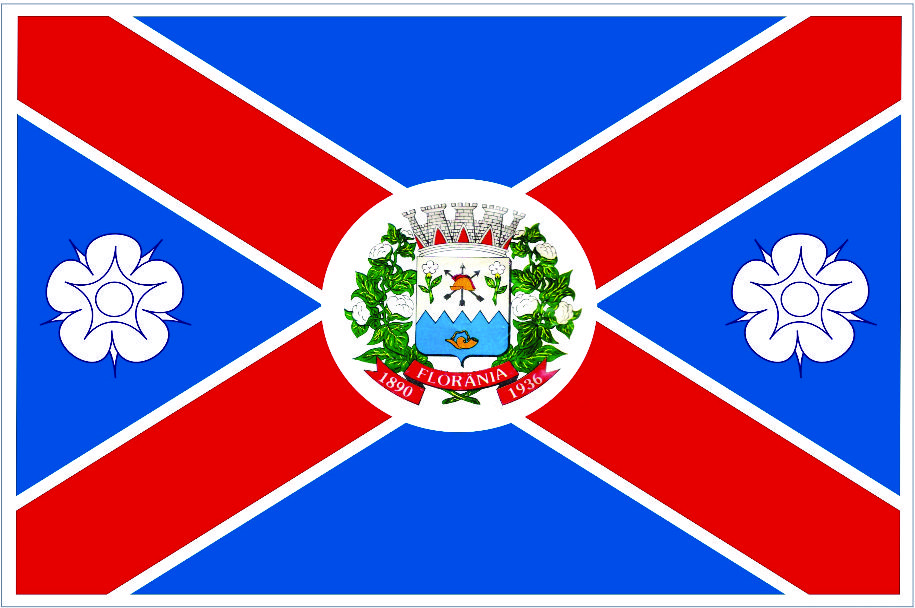
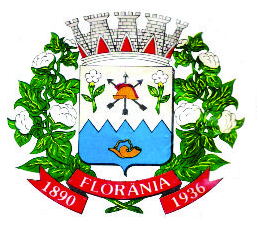
- Flag Coat of arms

- Location in Brazil
- Coordinates: 6°08′S 36°49′W
- Country: Brazil
- Region: Nordeste
- State: Rio Grande do Norte
- Mesoregion: Central Potiguar

Population (2020)
  - Total: 9,786
- Time zone: UTC -3

Florânia is a municipality in the state of Rio Grande do Norte in the Northeast region of Brazil.

According to IBGE (Instituto Brasileiro de Geografia e Estatística), the municipality had a population of 9,786 people in 2020.

List of Mayors:

Name	Years
Júnior de Janúncio	2012–present
Sinval Salomão Alves de Medeiros	2009-2012
Flávio José de Oliveira	2005-2008
Titi Nobre	
Sra. Jandira Alves de Medeiros	
Neto Laurentino	
Pe. Sinval Laurentino	
Manoel Emídio Filho	

== Climate ==
Climate data for Florânia (1981–2010)
Month	Jan	Feb	Mar	Apr	May	Jun	Jul	Aug	Sep	Oct	Nov	Dec	Year
Mean daily maximum °C (°F)	33.9 (93.0)	33.3 (91.9)	32.5 (90.5)	31.6 (88.9)	31.3 (88.3)	30.7 (87.3)	30.8 (87.4)	32.0 (89.6)	33.5 (92.3)	34.7 (94.5)	34.8 (94.6)	34.8 (94.6)	32.8 (91.0)
Daily mean °C (°F)	27.4 (81.3)	27.1 (80.8)	26.6 (79.9)	26.2 (79.2)	26.0 (78.8)	25.2 (77.4)	25.2 (77.4)	25.6 (78.1)	26.5 (79.7)	27.3 (81.1)	27.6 (81.7)	27.8 (82.0)	26.5 (79.7)
Mean daily minimum °C (°F)	22.6 (72.7)	22.5 (72.5)	22.2 (72.0)	22.1 (71.8)	21.7 (71.1)	20.8 (69.4)	20.6 (69.1)	20.6 (69.1)	21.2 (70.2)	21.8 (71.2)	22.2 (72.0)	22.6 (72.7)	21.7 (71.1)
Average precipitation mm (inches)	82.6 (3.25)	102.6 (4.04)	171.5 (6.75)	169.8 (6.69)	81.7 (3.22)	38.7 (1.52)	21.8 (0.86)	9.3 (0.37)	1.7 (0.07)	5.0 (0.20)	4.6 (0.18)	24.1 (0.95)	713.4 (28.09)
Average precipitation days (≥ 1.0 mm)	6	8	12	12	7	5	4	2	1	0	1	2	60
Average relative humidity (%)	63.6	67.7	73.8	76.3	73.1	69.3	65.0	60.7	56.2	55.5	56.2	58.5	64.7
Mean monthly sunshine hours	211.5	192.3	201.1	200.9	204.7	200.2	213.6	260.1	275.2	284.7	266.5	244.1	2,754.9
Source: Instituto Nacional de Meteorologia

== See also ==
- List of municipalities in Rio Grande do Norte
