= São Vicente do Seridó =

- Municipality
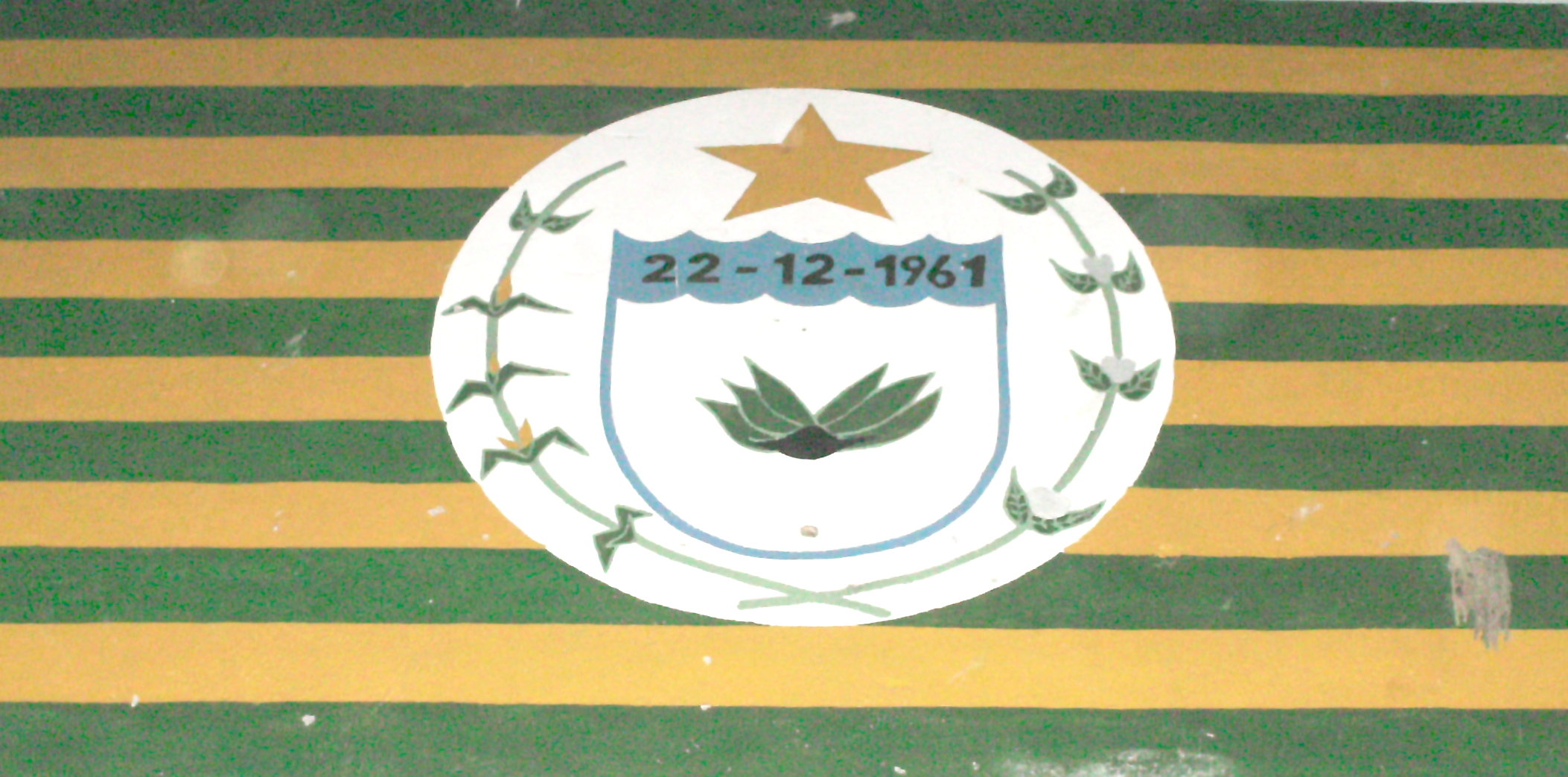
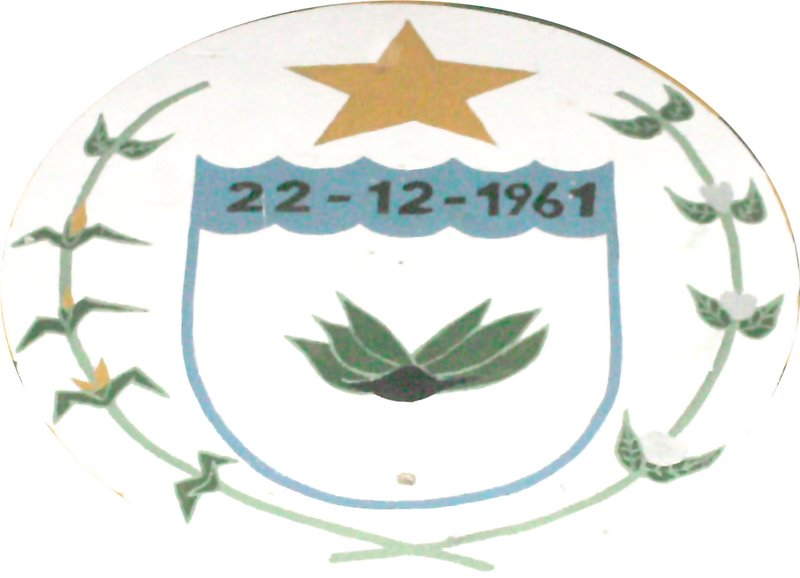
- Flag Coat of arms

- Location in Paraíba state

- Location in Brazil
- Coordinates: 6°51′S 36°25′W
- Country: Brazil
- Region: Northeast
- State: Paraíba

Population (2020)
  - Total: 10,848
- Time zone: UTC−3 (BRT)

São Vicente do Seridó is a municipality in Paraíba state in the Northeast Region of Brazil.
