= Lagoa Nova =

Municipality in Rio Grande do Norte, Brazil

Coordinates: 6°10′04″S 36°47′33″W

Natal
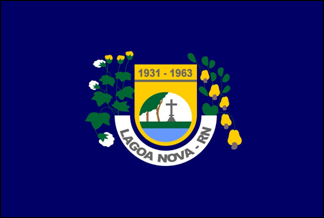
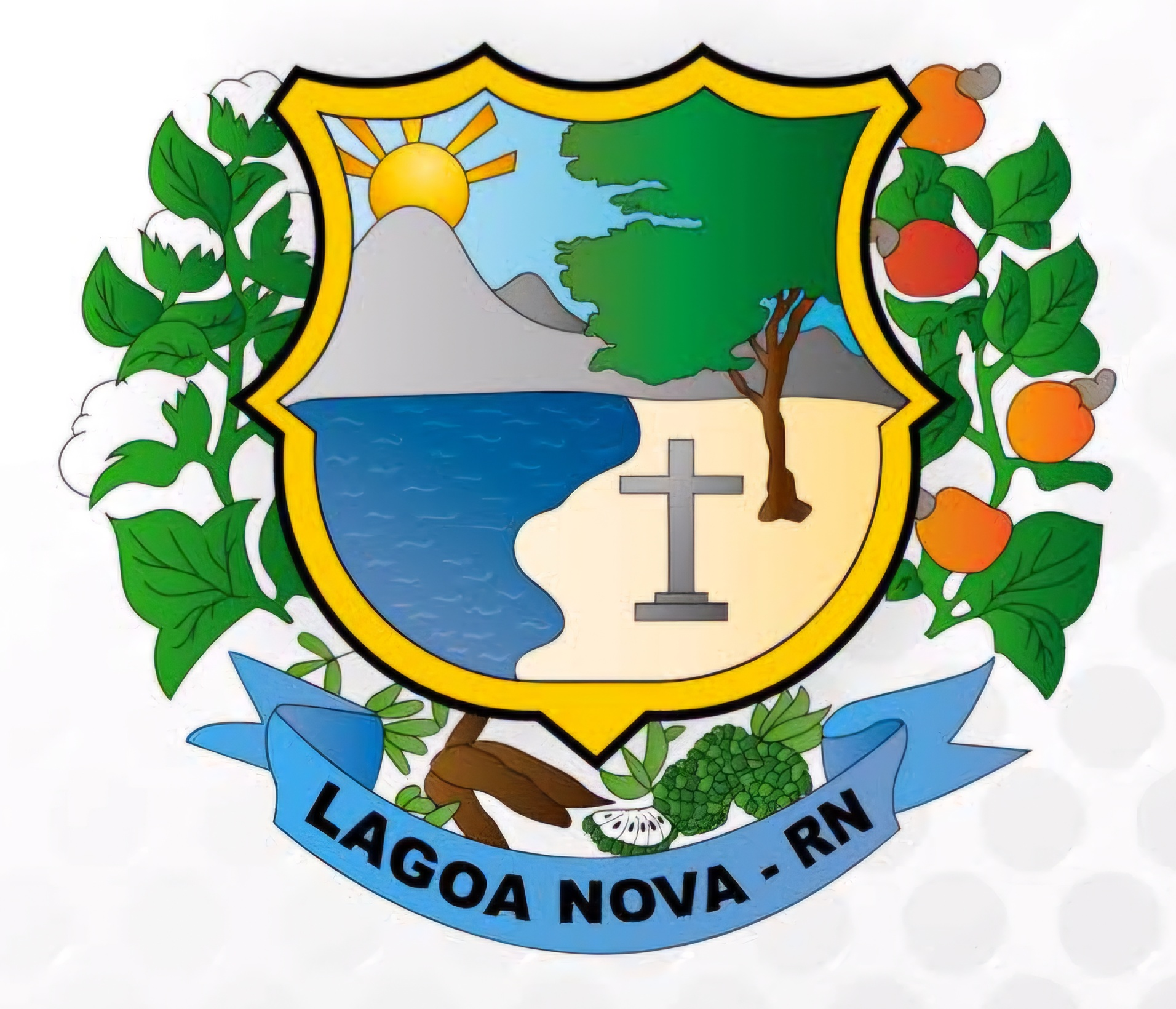
- Flag Coat of arms
- Nickname: "City of the hill"
- Location of Lagoa Nova
- Country: Brazil
- Region: Northeast
- State: Rio Grande do Norte
- Emancipated from Currais Novos: 2 January 1964

Government
  - Mayor: Erivan de Souza Costa (PSB)

Area
  - Total: 176 km^{2} (68 sq mi)
- Elevation: 695 m (2,280 ft)

Population (2020)
  - Total: 15,749
  - Density: 74/km^{2} (190/sq mi)
- Time zone: UTC-3

Lagoa Nova (lit. "New Pond") is a municipality of Rio Grande do Norte state in the Northeast of Brazil.
