= Jardim de Piranhas =

Municipality in Rio Grande do Norte, Brazil

Coordinates: 6°22′S 37°20′W

- Municipality
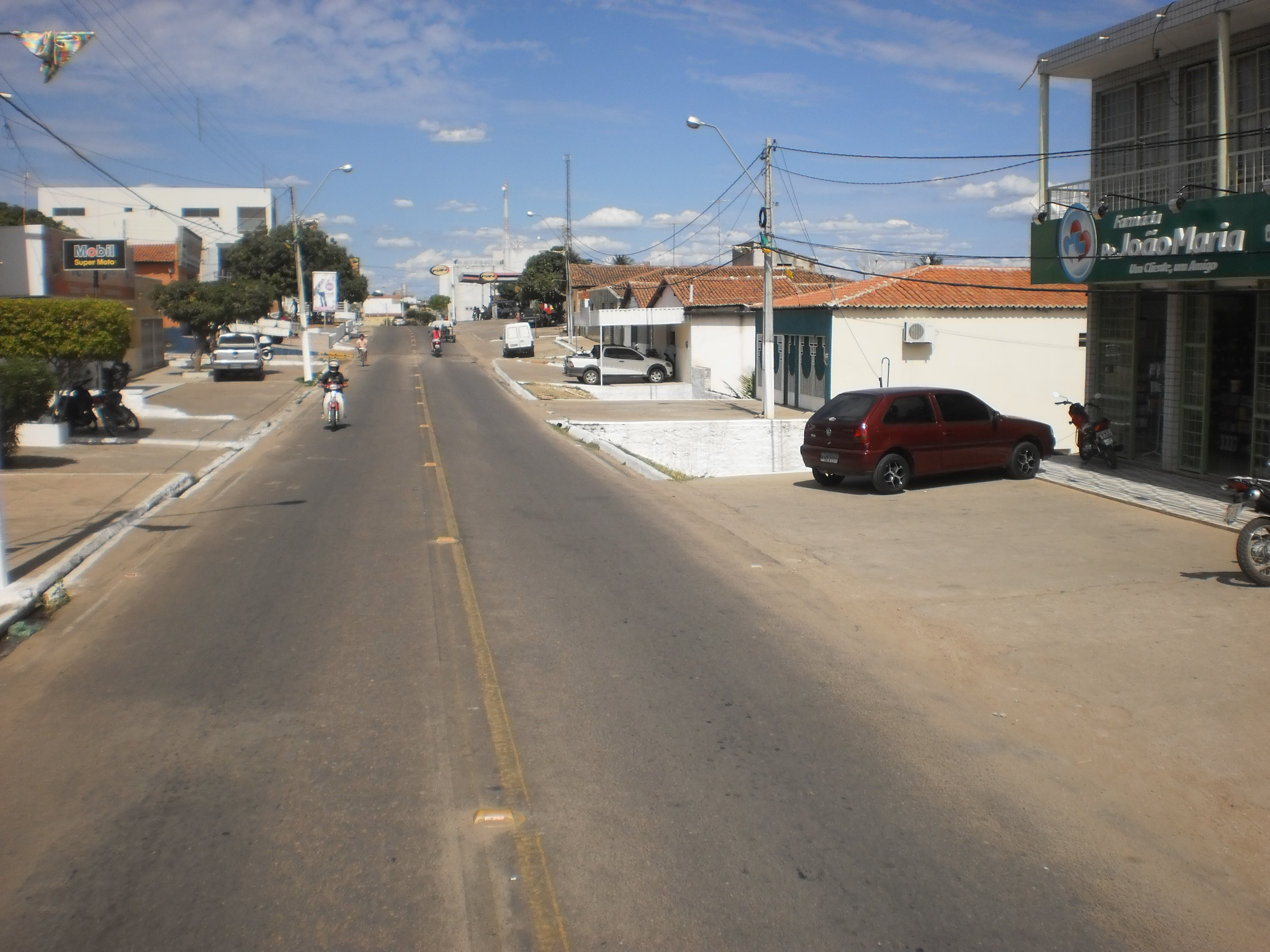
- Helicopter view from the city.

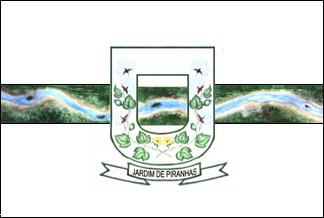
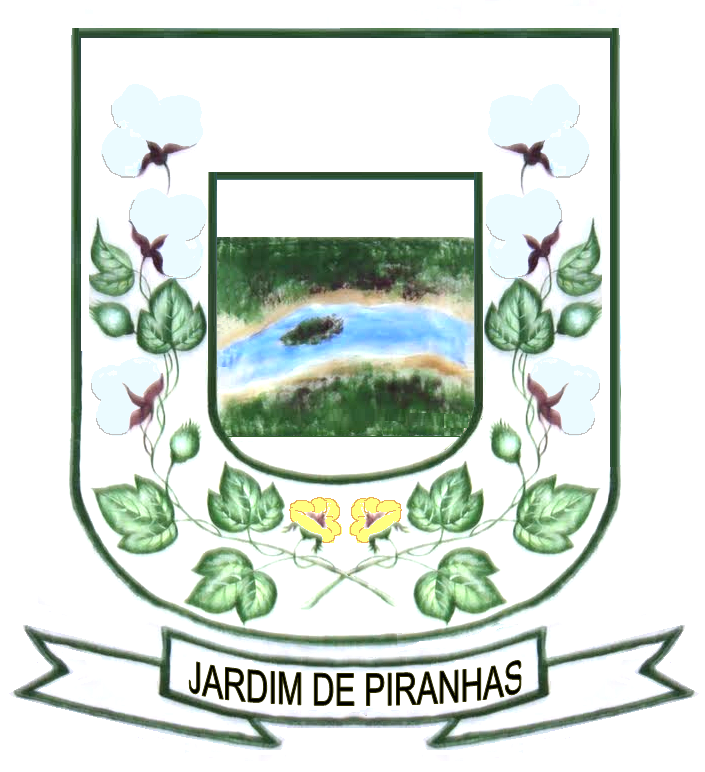
- Flag Coat of arms
- Interactive map of Jardim de Piranhas
- Country: Brazil
- Region: Nordeste
- State: Rio Grande do Norte
- Mesoregion: Central Potiguar

Population (2020)
  - Total: 14,942
- Time zone: UTC−3 (BRT)

Jardim de Piranhas is a municipality in the state of Rio Grande do Norte in the Northeast region of Brazil.

According to historical accounts, in the 19th century, cowboys attempting to cross the Piranhas River with their cattle became desperate due to the presence of piranha fish in the river. In their distress, they prayed to Nossa Senhora dos Aflitos (Our Lady of the Afflicted), promising to build a chapel in her honor if they safely made the crossing. After successfully crossing with their cattle, they fulfilled their vow by constructing a chapel. Later, a wealthy local woman named Margarida Cardoso Cavalcante donated land near the river for this chapel. The community that developed around this chapel became known as Jardim de Piranhas, named after Fazenda Jardim (Jardim Farm), located along the banks of the Piranhas River. The village grew steadily, eventually becoming a district of Caicó in 1936. On December 23, 1948, under State Law No. 146, Jardim de Piranhas was officially separated from Caicó and established as an independent municipality in the Brazilian state of Rio Grande do Norte.

== See also ==
- List of municipalities in Rio Grande do Norte
