= Jucurutu =

Municipality in Rio Grande do Norte, Brazil

Coordinates: 6.03389°S 37.02°W

Jucurutu-RN
- Municipality
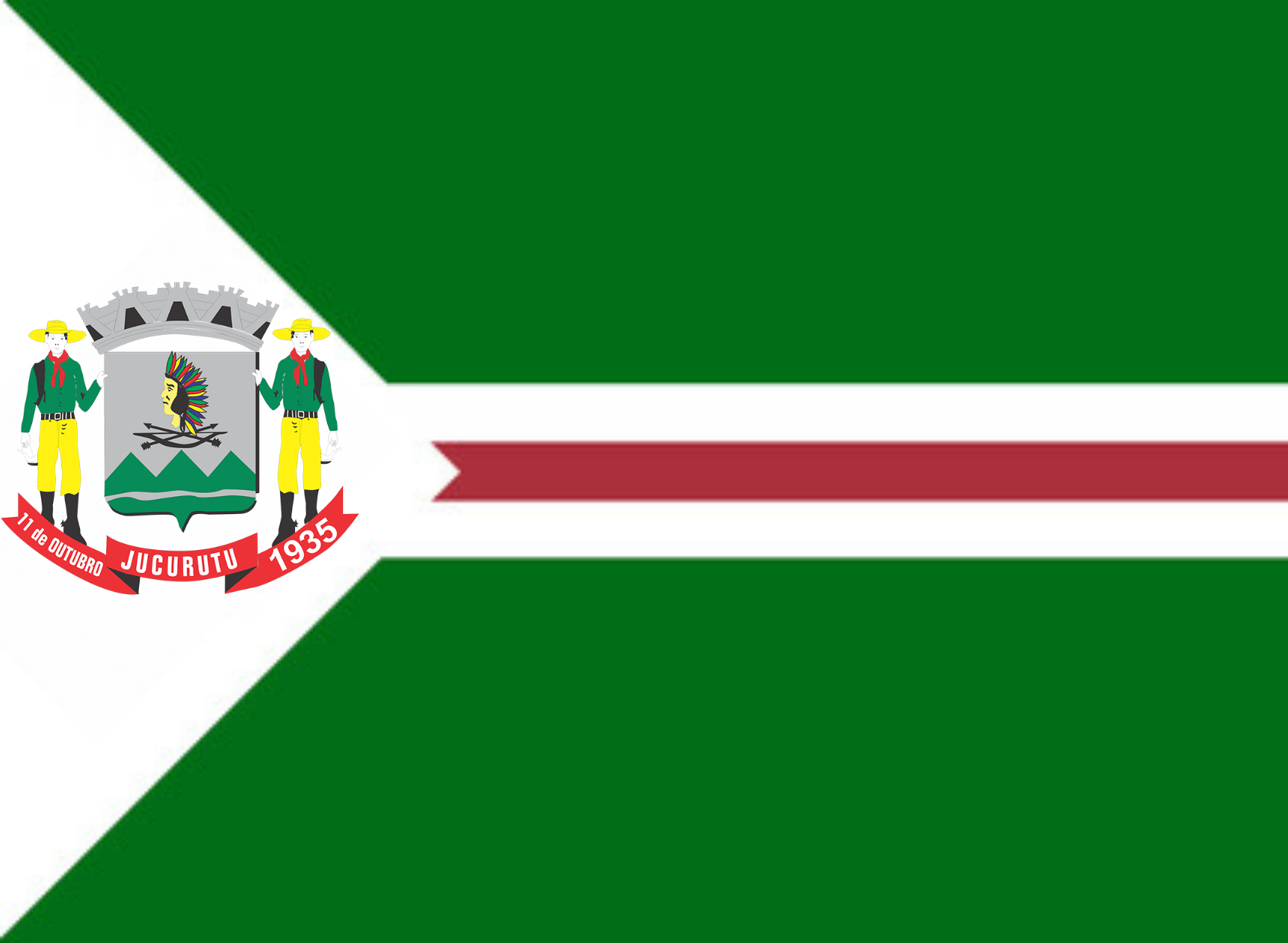
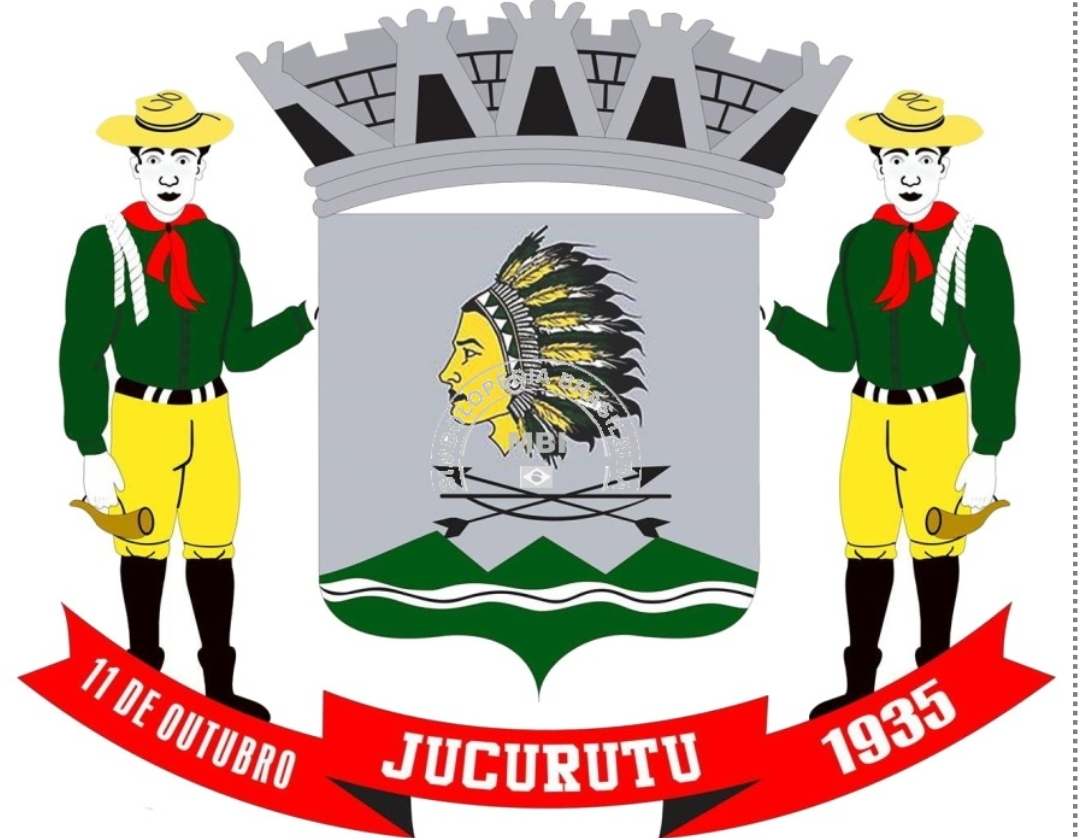
- Flag Coat of arms
- Interactive map of Jucurutu-RN
- Country: Brazil
- Region: Nordeste
- State: Rio Grande do Norte
- Mesoregion: Oeste Potiguar

Population (2020)
  - Total: 18,315
- Time zone: UTC−3 (BRT)

Jucurutu is a municipality in the state of Rio Grande do Norte in the Northeast region of Brazil.

== See also ==
- List of municipalities in Rio Grande do Norte
