= Currais Novos =

Municipality in Rio Grande do Norte, Brazil

- Municipality
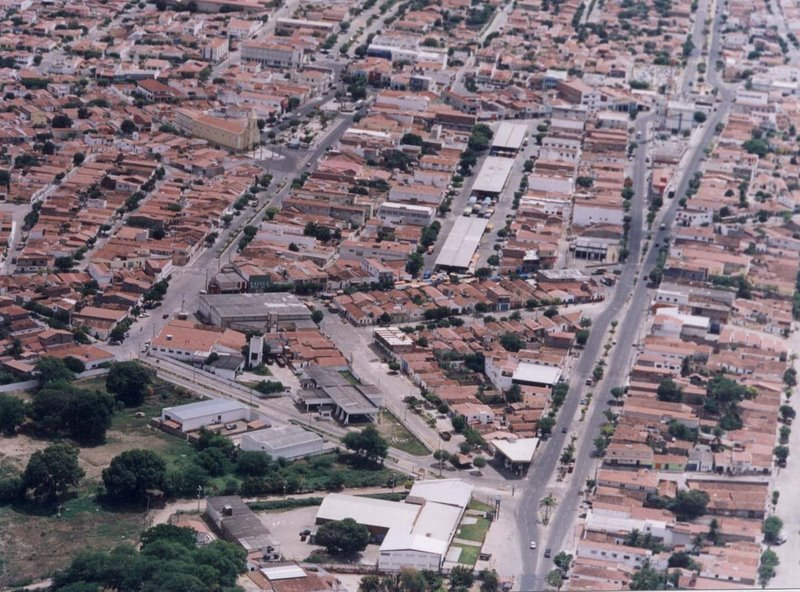
- Currais Novos aerial view.

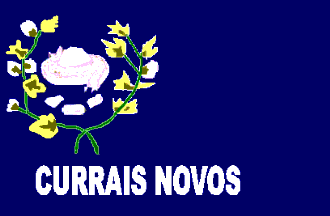
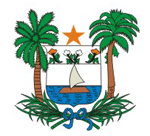
- Flag Coat of arms

- Location in Brazil
- Coordinates: 6°15′S 36°31′W
- Country: Brazil
- Region: Nordeste
- State: Rio Grande do Norte
- Mesoregion: Central Potiguar

Population (2020)
  - Total: 44,905
- Time zone: UTC -3

Currais Novos is a municipality in the state of Rio Grande do Norte in the Northeast region of Brazil. As of 2020, the population was estimated at 44,905.

== Prominent people ==
- Vicente de Lima (b. 1977), Olympic sprinter
- Francisco Fabiano Pereira Marciano (b. 1983), footballer
- Ignácio da Silva Oliveira, (b. 1996), footballer
- Euclides Pereira (b. 1941), jiu-jitsu coach
- Álvaro Felipe "Alvinho" da Silva (b. 1992), footballer

== See also ==
- List of municipalities in Rio Grande do Norte
- Apertados Canyon
