= Timbaúba dos Batistas =

Municipality in Rio Grande do Norte, Brazil

Coordinates: 6°27′S 37°17′W

- Municipality
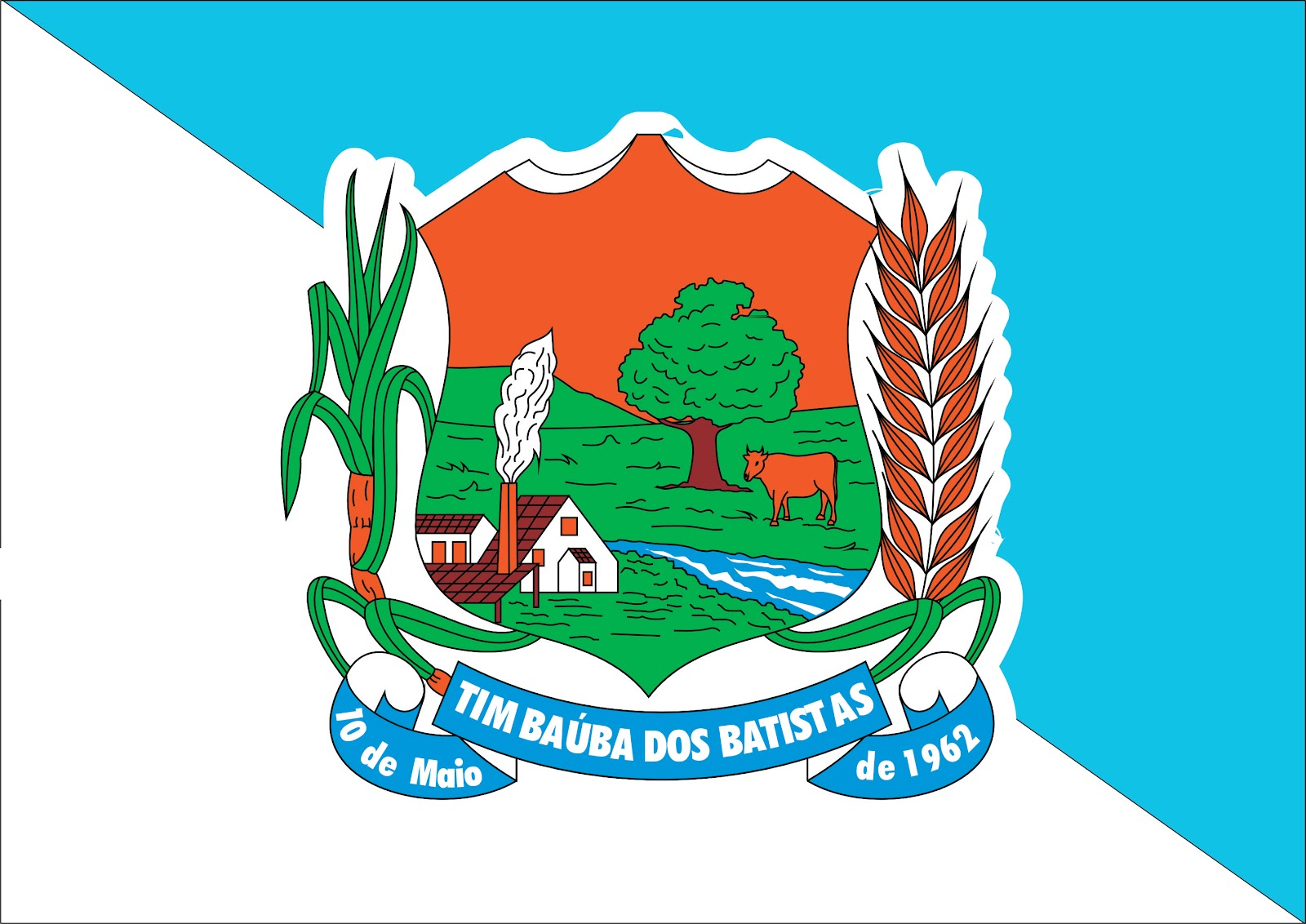
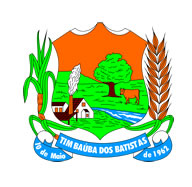
- Flag Coat of arms
- Interactive map of Timbaúba dos Batistas
- Country: Brazil
- Region: Nordeste
- State: Rio Grande do Norte
- Mesoregion: Central Potiguar

Population (2020)
  - Total: 2,421
- Time zone: UTC−3 (BRT)

Timbaúba dos Batistas is a municipality in the state of Rio Grande do Norte in the Northeast region of Brazil.

== See also ==
- List of municipalities in Rio Grande do Norte
