= São João do Sabugi =

Municipality in Rio Grande do Norte, Brazil

Coordinates: 6°43′S 37°12′W

- Municipality
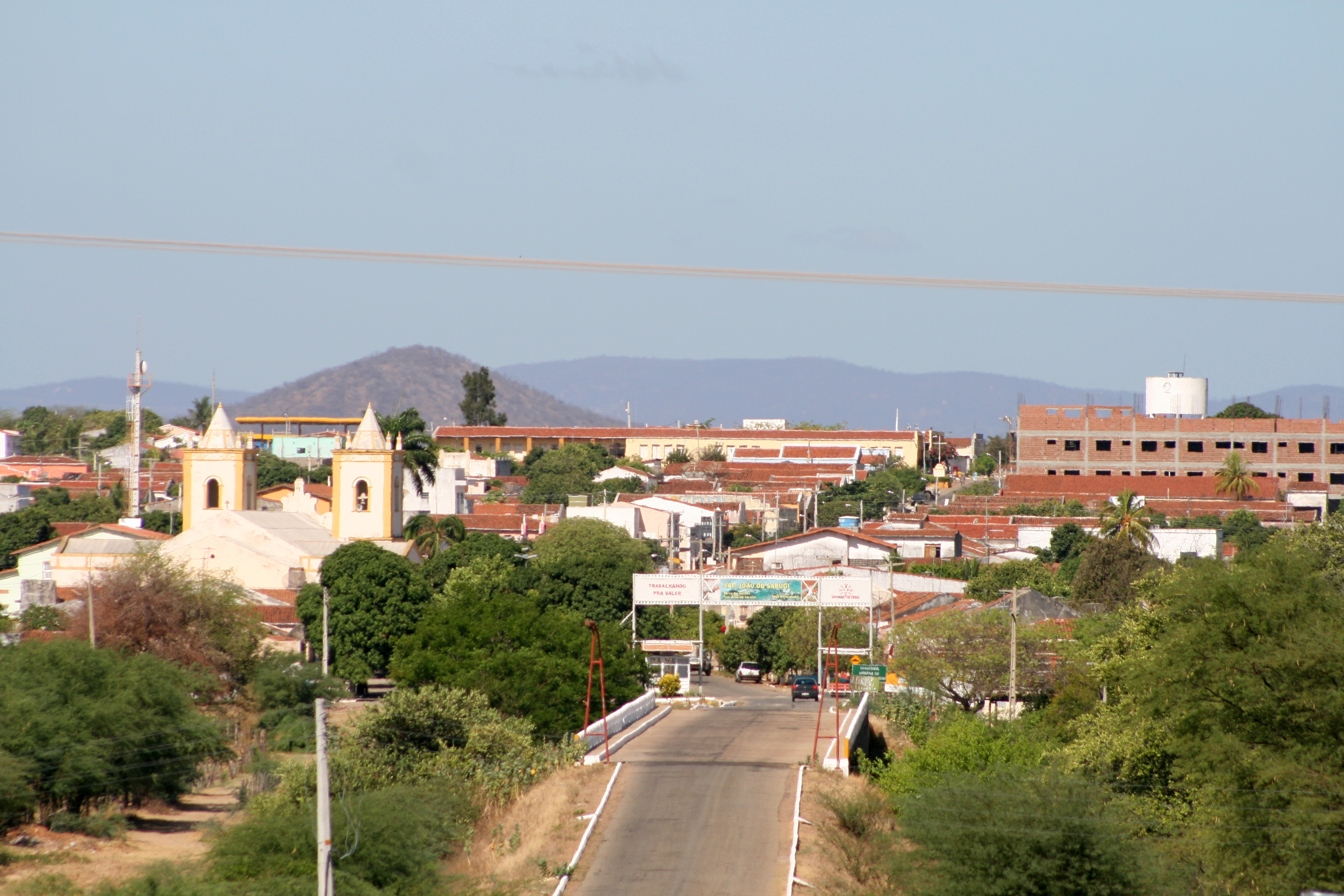
- Skyline of São João do Sabugi

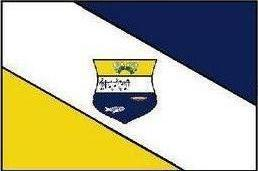
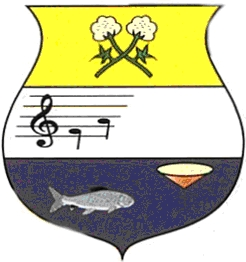
- Flag Coat of arms
- Interactive map of São João do Sabugi
- Country: Brazil
- Region: Nordeste
- State: Rio Grande do Norte
- Mesoregion: Central Potiguar

Population (2020)
  - Total: 6,207
- Time zone: UTC−3 (BRT)

São João do Sabugi is a municipality in the state of Rio Grande do Norte in the Northeast region of Brazil.

== See also ==
- List of municipalities in Rio Grande do Norte
