= Fernando Pedroza, Rio Grande do Norte =

Municipality in Rio Grande do Norte, Brazil

Coordinates: 5°45′40″S 36°23′31″W

Fernando Pedroza
- Municipality
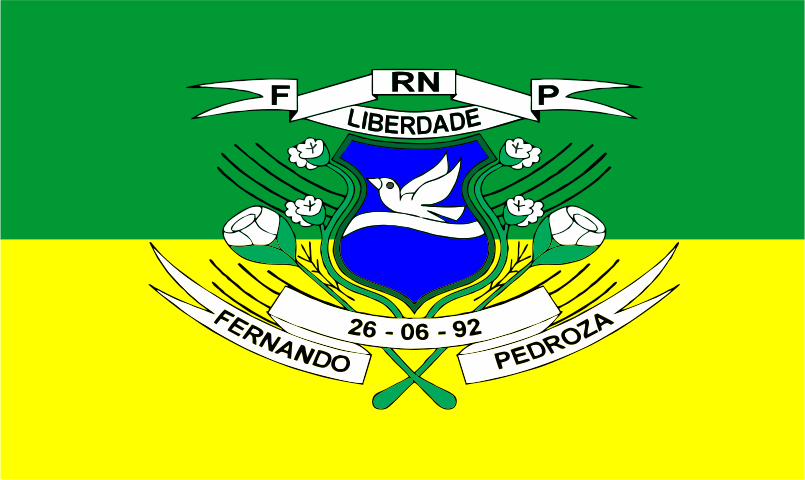
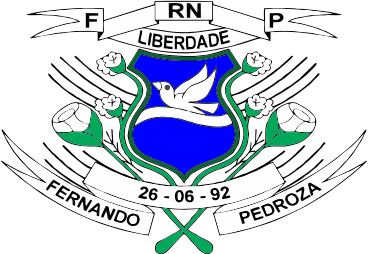
- Flag Coat of arms
- Interactive map of Fernando Pedroza
- Country: Brazil
- Region: Nordeste
- State: Rio Grande do Norte
- Mesoregion: Central Potiguar

Population (2020)
  - Total: 3,067
- Time zone: UTC -3

Fernando Pedroza is a municipality in the Brazilian state of Rio Grande do Norte.
