= Santana do Matos =

Municipality in Rio Grande do Norte, Brazil

Coordinates: 5°57′S 36°39′W

- Municipality
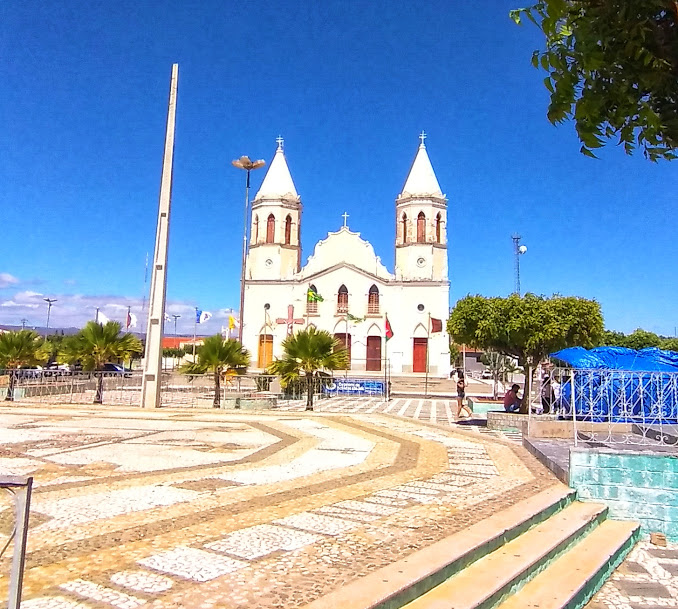
- Igreja Matriz de Sant'ana

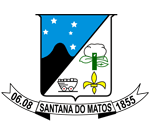
- Flag Coat of arms
- Interactive map of Santana do Matos
- Country: Brazil
- Region: Nordeste
- State: Rio Grande do Norte
- Mesoregion: Central Potiguar

Population (2020)
  - Total: 11,956
- Time zone: UTC−3 (BRT)

Santana do Matos is a municipality in the state of Rio Grande do Norte in the Northeast region of Brazil.

== See also ==
- List of municipalities in Rio Grande do Norte
