= List of beaches in Rio Grande do Norte =

Below is a list of beaches in the Brazilian state of Rio Grande do Norte by municipality.

The Rio Grande do Norte coast is 410 kilometres (250 mi) long and is located on the northeasternmost tip of the South American continent. In the state are located dozens of beaches, from virgin to urban ones, and famous for its dunes and cliffs.

== Urban area ==
=== Natal ===
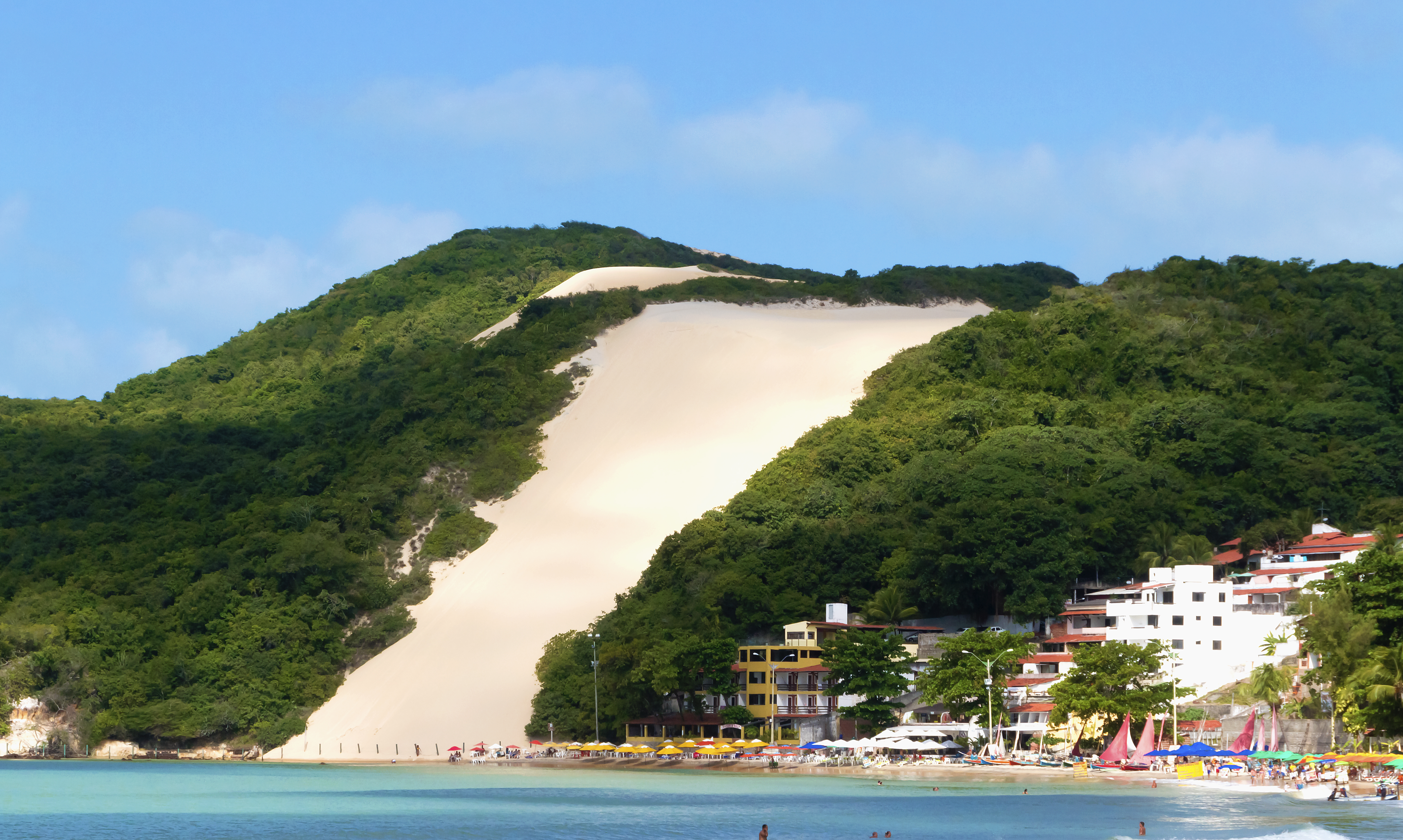
Morro do Careca in Ponta Negra.

- Areia Preta
- Praia dos Artistas
- Praia do Meio
- Praia do Forte
- Ponta Negra
- Redinha

== North Coast ==
=== Extremoz ===
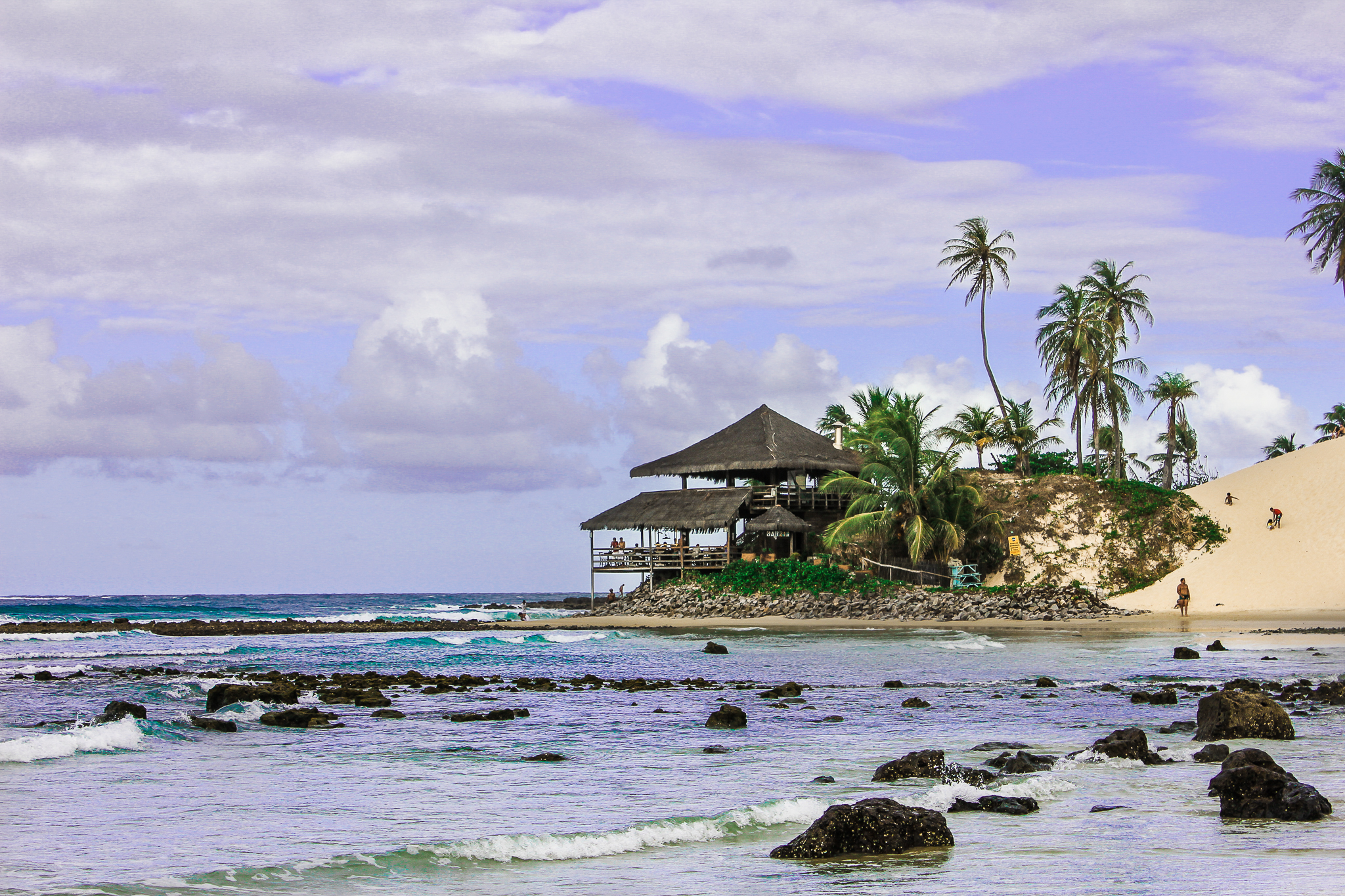
View from Genipabu beach.

- Genipabu
- Pitangui
- Redinha Nova
- Santa Rita
- Graçandu

=== Ceará-Mirim ===
- Prainha
- Muriú
- Porto-Mirim
- Jacumã

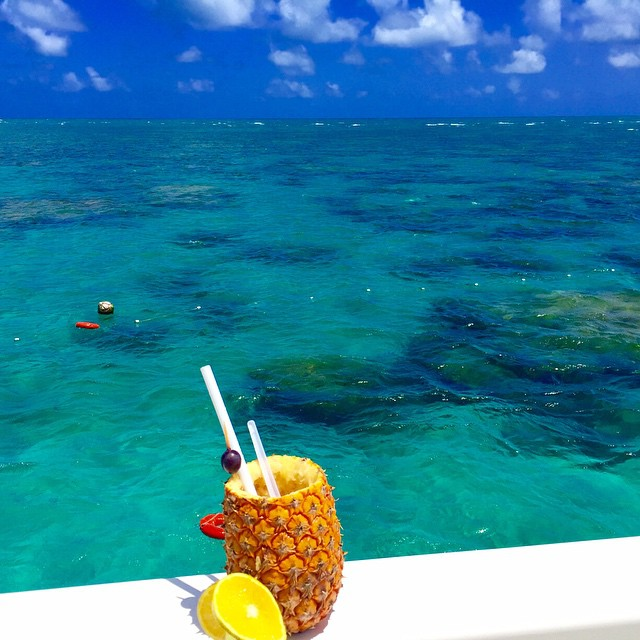
The coral formations in Maracajaú known as "Parrachos de Maracajaú".

=== Maxaranguape ===
- Maracajaú
- Caraúbas
- Ponta Gorda
- Cabo de São Roque
- Barra de Maxaranguape

=== Rio do Fogo ===
- Barra de Punaú
- Perobas
- Pititinga
- Rio do Fogo
- Zumbi

=== Touros ===
- Calcanhar
- Carnaubinha
- Gameleira
- Garças
- Touros

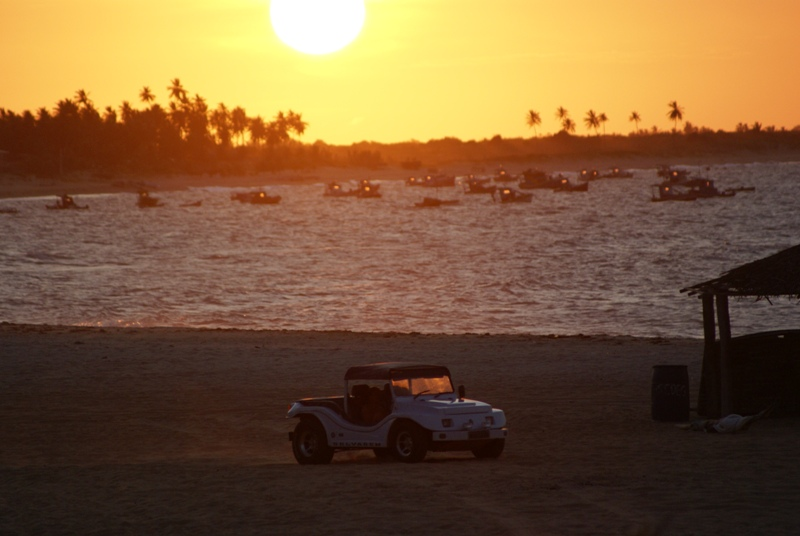
São Miguel do Gostoso beach.

=== São Miguel do Gostoso ===
- Cardeiro
- Ponta do Santo Cristo
- Xêpa
- Praia do Maceió
- Tourinhos

=== Pedra Grande ===
- Enxú Queimado
- Praia da Barra
- Praia dos Currais
- Arraial do Marco

=== São Bento do Norte ===
- Praia do Farol
- Praia do Serafim

=== Caiçara do Norte ===
- Praia de Caiçara do Norte

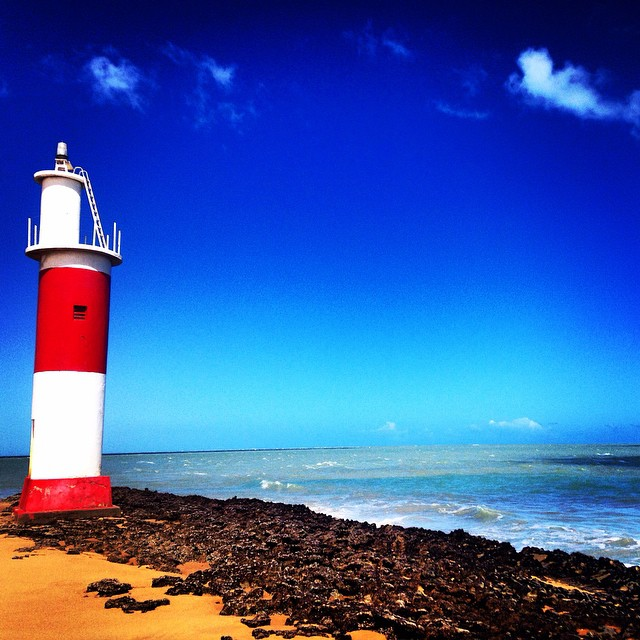
Galinhos lighthouse at the Farol beach in Galinhos.

=== Galinhos ===
- Praia do Farol
- Praia do Capim
- Praia de Galos
- Praia de Galinhos

=== Guamaré ===
- Aratuá
- Praia do Amaro
- Praia da Atabaia
- Praia do Minhoto

=== Macau ===
- Praia de Barreiras
- Praia de Camapum
- Praia Diogo Lopes

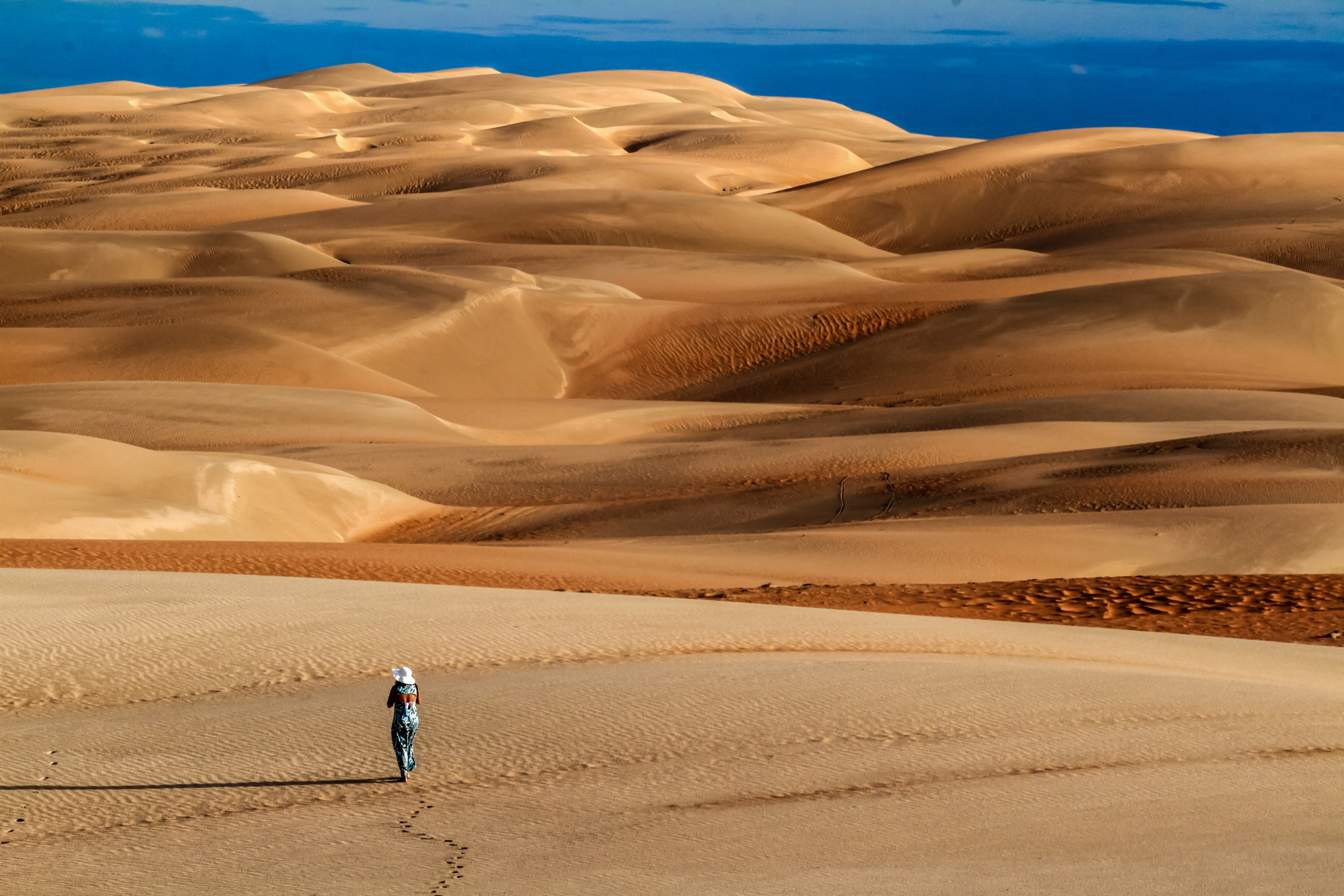
Dunas do Rosado in Porto do Mangue.

=== Porto do Mangue ===
- Pedra Grande
- Praia da Costinha

=== Areia Branca ===
- Praia Ponta do Mel
- Praia Redonda
- Praia do Rosado
- Praia São Cristovão

=== Tibau ===
- Praia de Tibau

== South Coast ==
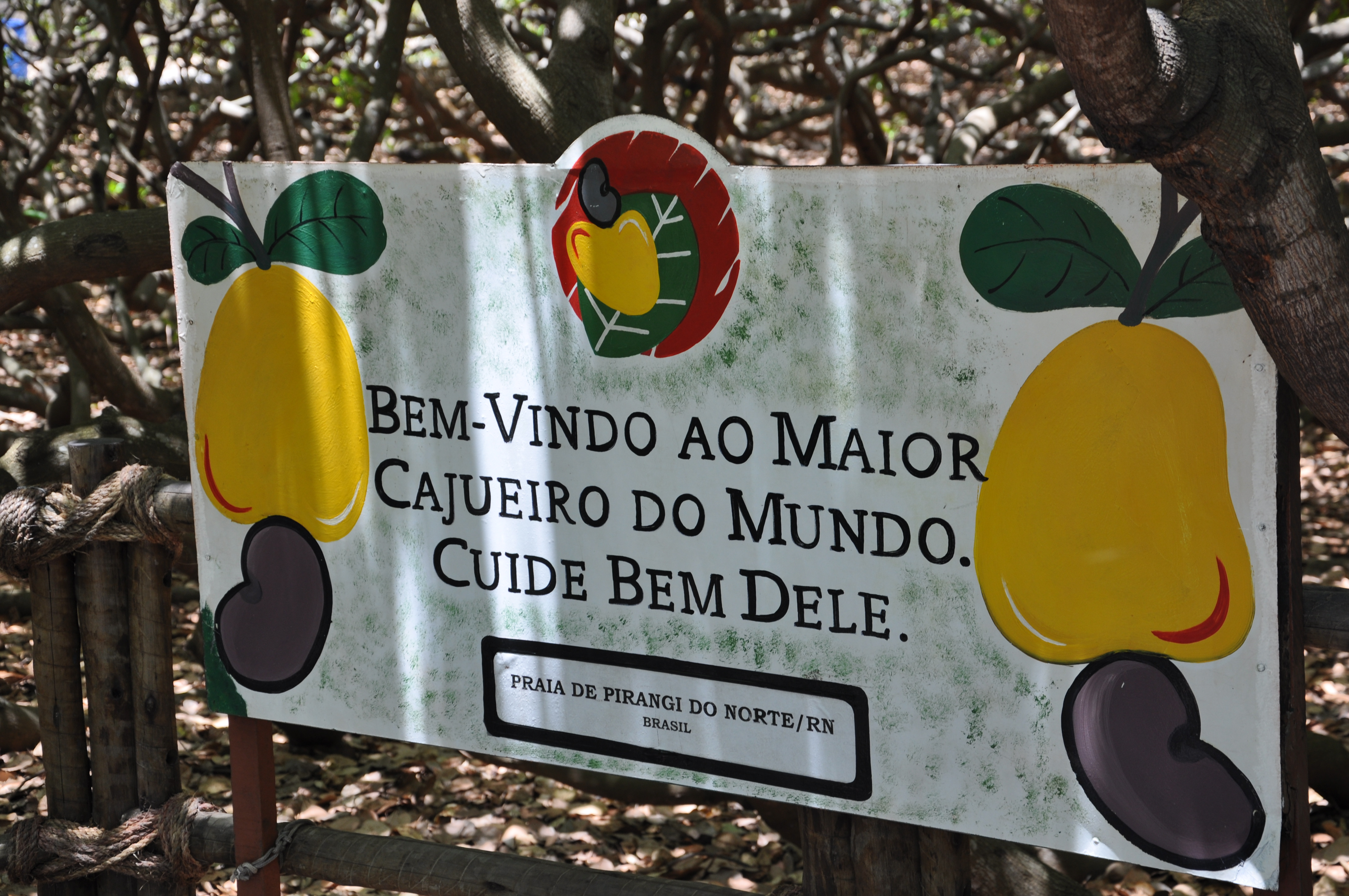
A sign at the interior of the Cashew of Pirangi, called the world's largest cashew tree and located in Pirangi do Norte beach.

=== Parnamirim ===
- Praia de Pium
- Praia de Cotovelo
- Pirangi do Norte

=== Nísia Floresta ===
- Pirangi do Sul
- Praia de Búzios
- Camurupim
- Barreta
- Barra de Tabatinga

=== Senador Georgino Avelino ===
- Praia de Malembá

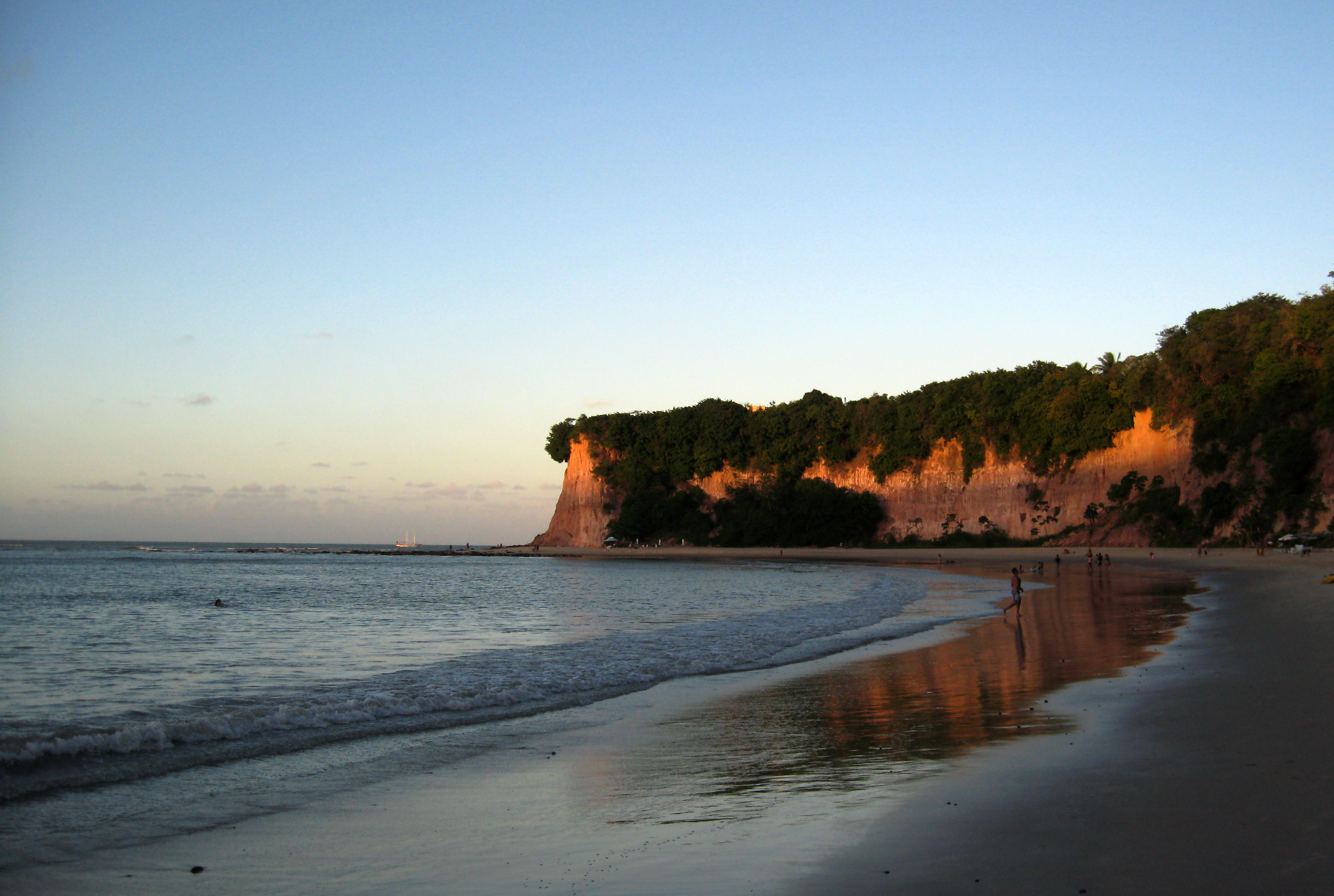
View from Baía dos Golfinhos in Pipa, Tibau do Sul.

=== Tibau do Sul ===
- Praia de Cacimbinhas
- Praia de Pipa
- Baía dos Golfinhos
- Praia do Amor
- Praia do Madeiro
- Praia das Minas
- Praia do Giz
- Sibaúma

=== Canguaretama ===
- Barra de Cunhaú

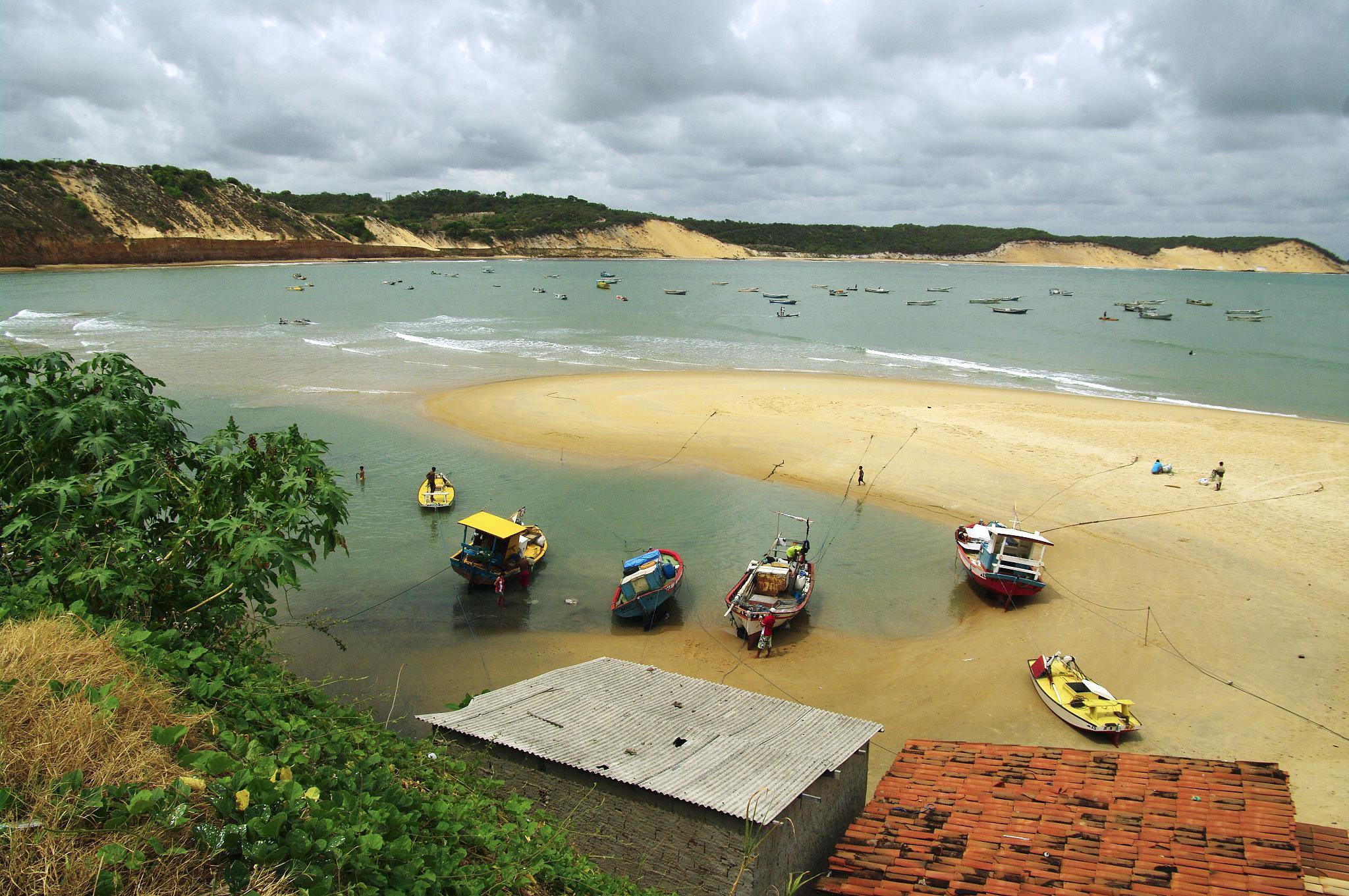
Baía Formosa is located at the southern end of the coast of Rio Grande do Norte and border with the state of Paraíba.

=== Baía Formosa ===
- Sagi
- Praia de Bacupari
- Perobas
- Barreirinhas
