= Microregion of Macau =

Coordinates: 5°06′54″S 36°38′02″W

Macau
- Microregion
- Country: Brazil
- State: Rio Grande do Norte
- Mesoregion: Central Potiguar

Macau was a microregion in the Brazilian state of Rio Grande do Norte.

== Municipalities ==
The microregion consisted of the following municipalities:

- Caiçara do Norte
- Galinhos
- Guamaré
- Macau
- São Bento do Norte
