= Cape São Roque =

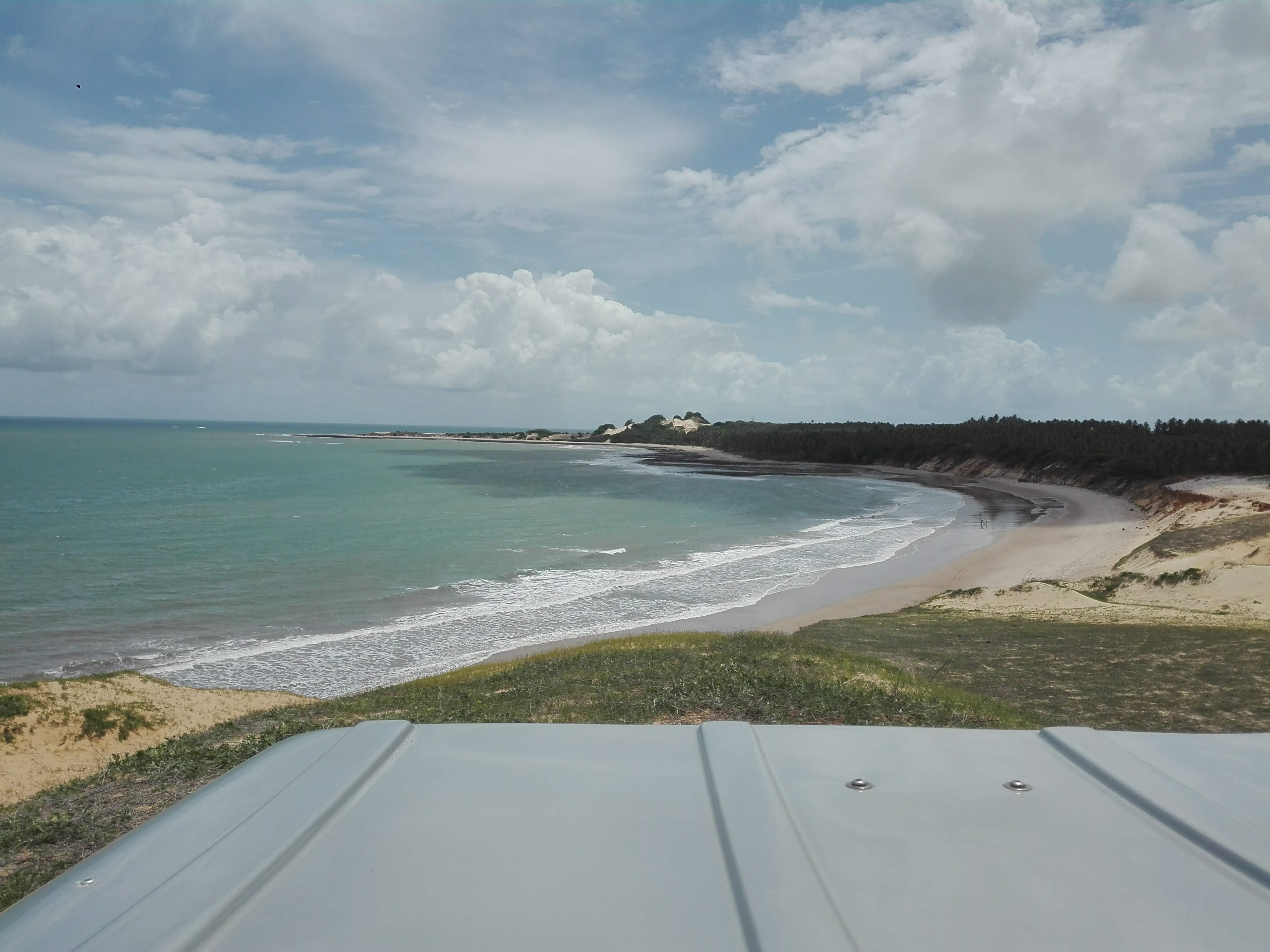
- Cape São Roque

- Location in Brazil
- Coordinates: 5°28′57″S 35°15′41″W
- Country: Brazil
- State: Rio Grande do Norte

Cape São Roque (Port. Cabo de São Roque) or Cape St Roque is a cape that forms the northeastern tip of Brazil.

Cape São Roque is located in the municipality of Maxaranguape, 51 km north of Natal, in the state of Rio Grande do Norte in Brazil. Cape São Roque is the "point" on the bend of the Brazilian mainland coast that is closest to the continent of Africa.

The cape was first officially visited by European navigators in 1501, in the 1501–1502 Portuguese mapping expedition led by André Gonçalves and Amerigo Vespucci, who named the spot after the saint of the day, Saint Roch, whose feast day is August 16.
