= Biro-Biro (footballer, born 1974) =

Brazilian footballer

Personal information
- Full name: João Bosco Gualberto de Freitas
- Date of birth: June 23, 1974 (age 52)
- Place of birth: Caiçara do Norte, Rio Grande do Norte, Brazil
- Height: 1.60 m (5 ft 3 in)
- Position: Midfielder

Senior career*
Years	Team	Apps	(Gls)
1993–1999	América-RN	45	(0)
2003	Flamengo-PI		
2003–2004	Atromitos	24	(2)
2004–2005	Tisza Volán Szeged		
2005–2006	Aek-Kranid	30	(10)
2006	River		
- * Club domestic league appearances and goals

João Bosco Gualberto de Freitas, usually known as Biro-Biro (born June 23, 1974 in Caiçara do Norte, Rio Grande do Norte), is a retired professional Brazilian footballer who played as a midfielder for América-RN when the club was competing in Campeonato Brasileiro Série A in 1997 and in 1998.

== Career ==
Biro-Biro played for América-RN from 1993 to 1999, helping his club finish as Campeonato Brasileiro Série B runner-up in 1996. He then played 45 Campeonato Brasileiro Série A matches for América-RN in 1997 and in 1998, and helped his club win the Campeonato do Nordeste in 1998, scoring one of the three club goals in the second leg of the final against Vitória of Bahia state. In 2003, he played for Flamengo-PI, moving to Atromitos of Greece in 2003, then Tisza Volán Szeged of Hungary in 2004, and Aek-Kranid of Greece in 2005, scoring ten goals in thirty matches for the latter club. In 2006, he retired while playing for River.

== Honors ==
Biro-Biro won the following honors during his playing career

Club	Competition	Seasons
América-RN	Campeonato do Nordeste	1998
América-RN	Campeonato Brasileiro Série B runner-up	1996
