= Via Costeira =

Coordinates: 5°48′52″S 35°10′56″W

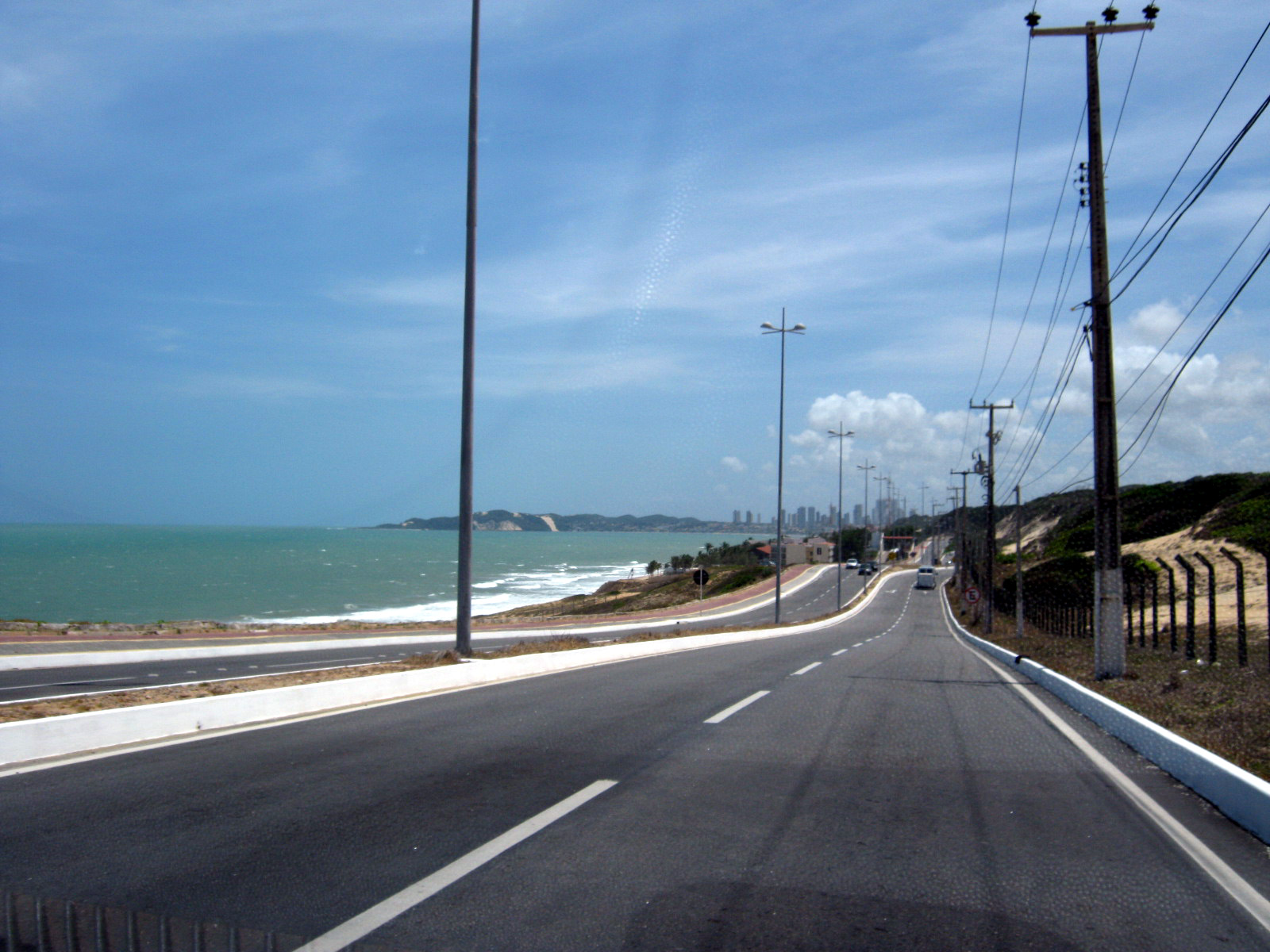
Via Costeira.

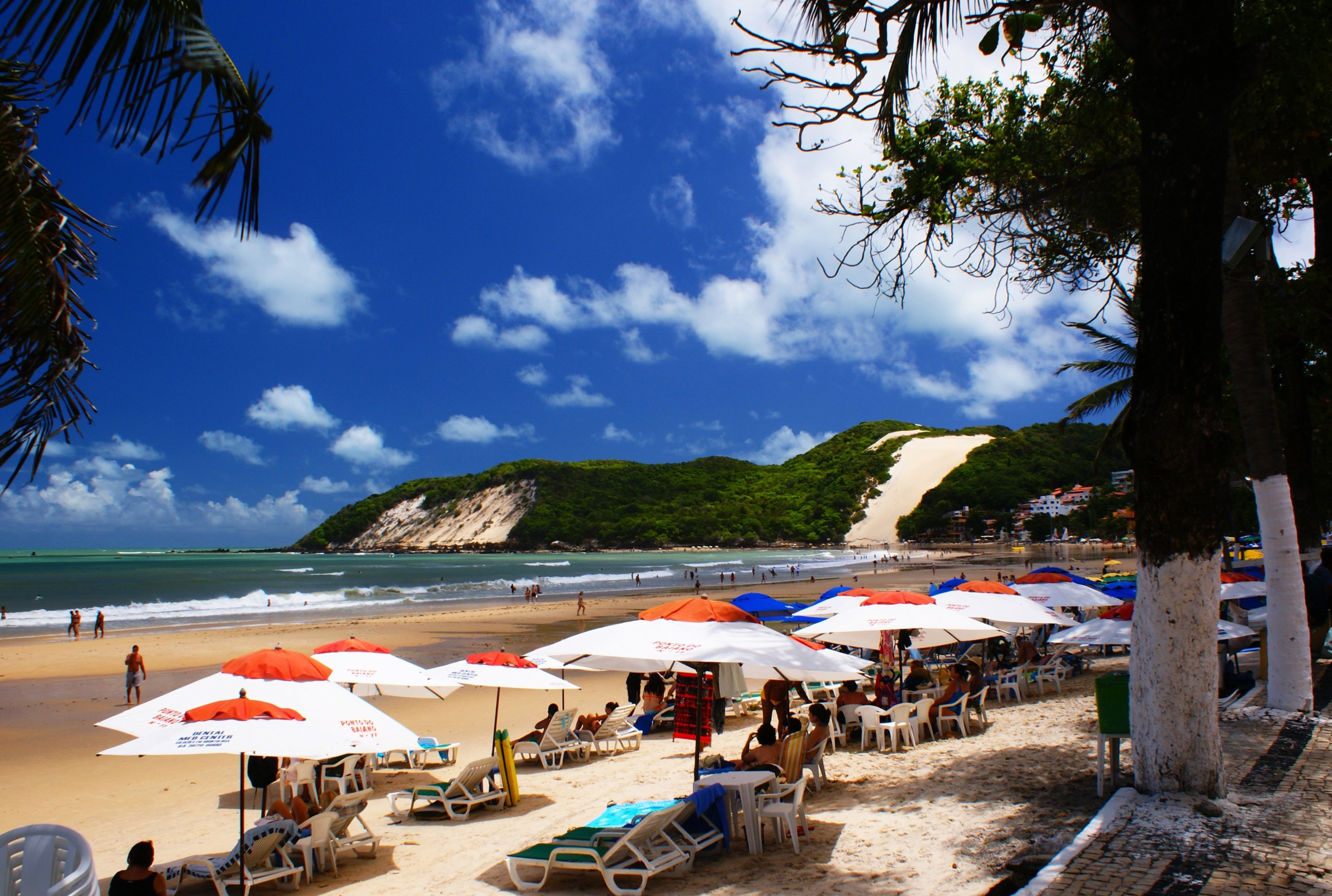
Ponta Negra beach.

The Senador Dinarte Mariz Avenue, also known as Via Costeira (English for "Coastal Way") is one of the most important avenues in Natal, Brazil.

Much visited by tourists, is a continuation of Ponta Negra beach in Natal, and consists of a coastal road about 9 km in length up to the Meio Beach. The side of the beach is taken by luxury hotels 4 to 5 stars, and a few restaurants and the other side is totally taken by the Parque das Dunas (Dunes Park), a large green area preserved by the IDEM. It is a very quiet beach, usually frequented only by guests of nearby hotels. It was built in 1985 by then Governor José Agripino to connect the urban beaches to the south of Natal, initiating the project with a tour of the city's first hotel construction in Coastal Route, the Natal Mar Hotel-owned by businessman Sami Elali.

The Coastal Route connects almost all the urban beaches of Natal, save Redinha Beach. So that in the Redinha beach, was built the Newton Navarro bridge, which is connected to Coastal Way, and the city center, with it, so that all urban beaches of the city are connected by a path of easy access.

Currently, the Coastal Way is being revitalized, duplicated, win a bicycle, and stage lighting.
