= América Futebol Clube (RN) =

Brazilian association football club based in Natal, Rio Grande do Norte

América de Natal
- Full name: América Futebol Clube
- Nicknames: Mecão (Big America); Dragão (Dragon)
- Founded: 14 July 1915; 111 years ago
- Ground: Arena das Dunas
- Capacity: 31,375
- SAF Owner: Hype S/A (80%)
- President: Hermano Morais
- League: Campeonato Brasileiro Série D Campeonato Potiguar
- 2025 2025: Série D, 6th of 64; Potiguar, 1st of 8 (champions)
- Website: www.americadenatalsaf.com.br
Home colours	Away colours

América Futebol Clube, commonly referred to as América de Natal, is a Brazilian professional club based in Natal, Rio Grande do Norte founded on 14 July 1915. It competes in the Campeonato Brasileiro Série D, the fourth tier of Brazilian football, as well as in the Campeonato Potiguar, the top flight of the Rio Grande do Norte state football league.

América won Campeonato do Nordeste (Brazilian Northeast Championship) in 1998, defeating Esporte Clube Vitória by a 3–1 score in the final match. It is the only Football Team in Rio Grande do Norte to obtain titles outside the state as in 1973, became the undefeated winner of Taça Almir de Albuquerque, which involved teams from North-Northeast of Brazil and is the only club from Rio Grande do Norte to participate in an international championship, the Copa Conmebol in 1998.

América's greatest rival is ABC, also from Natal.

América is the second-best-ranked team from Rio Grande do Norte in CBF's national club ranking, at 61st overall.

== History ==
The team was founded on July 14, 1915. The first official match played in the state of Rio Grande do Norte was América 3-0 ABC, on June 22, 1919 valid for the first Campeonato Potiguar de Futebol, organized at that time by the Liga de Desportos Terrestres. The club's first title came in 1919. The club won the Liga de Desportos Terrestres, defeating Centro Esportivo Natalense and ABC, becoming the first Campeonato Potiguar champions.

On November 7, 1928, through Law 707 the club was the first to be recognized as a State Public Utility instrument.

América had been licensed team of the Federação Norteriograndense de Futebol (FNF) for 5 years, between 1960 and 1965, thus the team did not participate in official competitions. Instead, the team committed to the construction of its official ground at Rodrigues Alves Avenue, bourough of Tirol, Natal.

In 1973, América won the Torneio Norte-Nordeste. In 1974 América was crowned undefeated state champions, playing 20 matches with 12 wins and 8 ties. Between 1987 and 1992, América won 5 state championships, only losing in 1990.

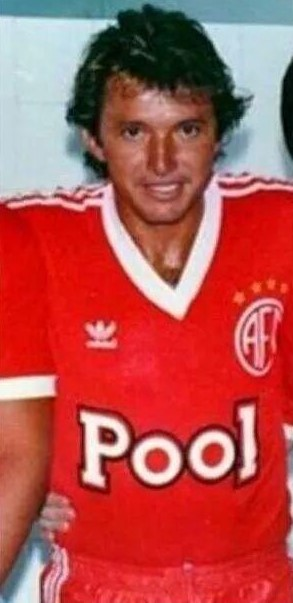
Football player Marinho Chagas in América, 1985.

In 1996, the team from Rio Grande do Norte was runner-up of the Brazilian Championship Second Division and became eligible to participate in the First Division in the following year. In its return to the main division, América ended in 16th place, ahead of other powerful teams, such as Corinthians and Fluminense. In 1998, however, the club failed to remain in the First Division. In 1998, América achieved its greatest glory, becoming champions of Campeonato do Nordeste, defeating Vitória in the final match on July 4, 3-1, with goals from Biro-Biro, Paulinho Kobayashi and Carioca. América's team at that time consisted of the following players: Gabriel; Gilson, Paulo Roberto (André), Lima and Rogerinho; Montanha, Carioca, Biro-Biro and Moura; Paulinho Kobayashi and Leonardo (Vanderlei).

In October, 2003 the city counsellor Hermano Morais published in the Diário Oficial do Município, the Law n° 5.493, recognizing América Futebol Clube, as an instrument of the City's Public Utility.

In 2005, the club was promoted to the Campeonato Brasileiro Second Division, after finishing in second in the third division. América had the best forward of the competition, Paulinho Marília, who scored 10 goals.

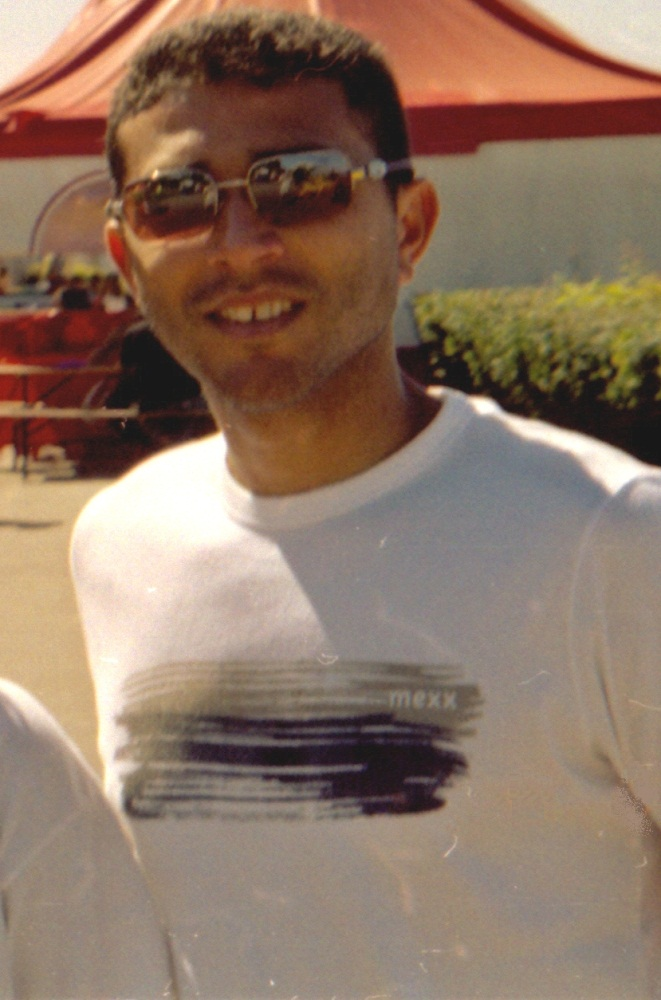
Souza américa Idol player in 2006.

On November 25, 2006, América once again managed to qualify for the Brazilian Championship First Division, after a 2-2 tie with champions Atlético Mineiro, at Mineirão, with a record crowd of 74,694 (largest crowd of the year in Brazil), fighting back after conceding two early goals. At the end of the game, América crossed the stadium applauded by Atlético's fans. The club finished in fourth in the Campeonato Brasileiro Second Division.

In the following year, América was relegated after a disastrous performance in the Série A, obtaining only 17 points out of 114 possible points, and finishing the championship 24 points behind the second-to-last placed team, Paraná. After two seasons struggling against relegation in the Série B, América eventually was relegated to the Série C in 2010, but gained promotion to the Série B again in 2011.

In 2014, they achieved a big comeback against Fluminense a 5-2 victory in Rio de Janeiro after losing 3-0 in Natal in the Copa do Brasil competition, reaching the quarterfinals. In 2022, the club was champion of Campeonato Brasileiro Série D after a 2–1 aggregate win over Pouso Alegre.

In 2026, América lost 18 points for fielding an ineligible player in the first three rounds of that year's Campeonato Potiguar, going from an undefeated first place, with 10 points, to second-to-last, with -8 points, in the championship. The club was relegated in the sixth round of the league, after drawing 0-0 with Potiguar de Mossoró away from home. Later, the Sports Court of Justice of Rio Grande do Norte state (Tribunal de Justiça Desportiva do Estado do Rio Grande do Norte, TJD-RN) lifted the 18-point penalty for América, applying a fine of R$ 15,000 reais to the club for violating the championship regulations.

== Stadium ==
The team played in a 10,900 capacity stadium named Barrettão in the town of Ceará-Mirim while the Dunas stadium was built for the 2014 World Cup. The Machadao stadium was demolished in 2011.

América's home stadium was the Estádio Dr. João Cláudio Vasconcelos Machado (Machadão) stadium, which had a maximum capacity of 42,000 fans.

== Derby ==
On June 10, 2006, América beat, by 3-1, its greatest rival, ABC Futebol Clube, in the first derby match played at ABC's own stadium. The derby is known as O Grande Clássico (The Great Derby).

== Symbols ==
The first color used by América-RN was blue. They started adopting the current red and white kit in 1920.

The first mascot was a "red devil", which was based on the mascot of América-RJ. In the mid-1990s, the mascot was changed to a dragon.

== Honours ==
=== Official tournaments ===
National
Competitions	Titles	Seasons
Campeonato Brasileiro Série D	1	2022
Regional
Competitions	Titles	Seasons
Copa do Nordeste	1	1998
State
Competitions	Titles	Seasons
Campeonato Potiguar	40	1919, 1920, 1922, 1924, 1926, 1927, 1930, 1931, 1946, 1948, 1949, 1951, 1952, 1956, 1957, 1967, 1969, 1974, 1975, 1977, 1979, 1980, 1981, 1982, 1987, 1988, 1989, 1991, 1992, 1996, 2002, 2003, 2012, 2014, 2015, 2019, 2023, 2024, 2025, 2026
Copa Rio Grande do Norte	1	2006

=== Others tournaments ===
==== Regional and Inter-state ====
- Taça Almir de Albuquerque (1): 1973
- Torneio Rio Grande do Norte-Pernambuco (1): 1983

==== State ====
- Copa Cidade do Natal (3): 2014, 2015, 2016
- Copa RN (4): 2012, 2013, 2019, 2022
- Torneio Início do Rio Grande do Norte (14): 1919, 1929, 1932, 1934, 1948, 1949, 1952, 1953, 1955, 1969, 1071, 1982, 1984, 1991

=== Runners-up ===
- Campeonato Brasileiro Série B (1): 1996
- Campeonato Brasileiro Série C (1): 2005
- Campeonato Potiguar (42): 1921, 1923, 1925, 1928, 1929, 1933, 1934, 1935, 1937, 1938, 1939, 1940, 1943, 1944, 1945, 1953, 1954, 1955, 1958, 1959, 1970, 1971, 1973, 1976, 1978, 1983, 1984, 1985, 1990, 1993, 1994, 1998, 1999, 2001, 2004, 2005, 2007, 2013, 2016, 2018, 2020, 2022
- Copa Rio Grande do Norte (1): 2007

=== Women's Football ===
- Campeonato Potiguar de Futebol Feminino (2): 2012, 2021
