= Maracajaú =

Community and beach in Maxaranguape, Brazil

Coordinates: 5°24′37″S 35°18′42″W

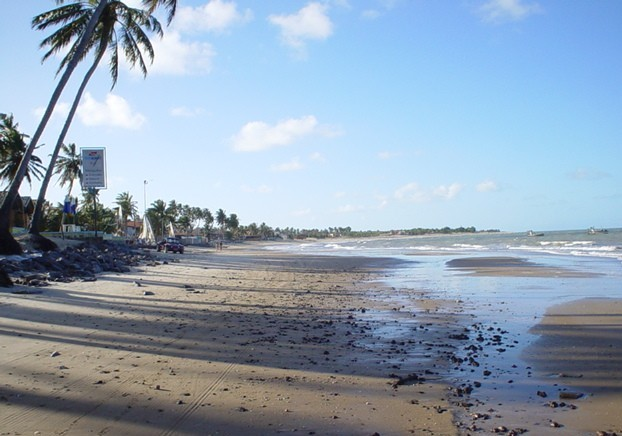
Maracajaú beach.

Maracajaú (Tupi) is a community and beach located in the Brazilian city of Maxaranguape, state of Rio Grande do Norte (about 50 km from the state capital, Natal). With a population of approximately 2,000 people the main source of income is fishing followed by tourism.

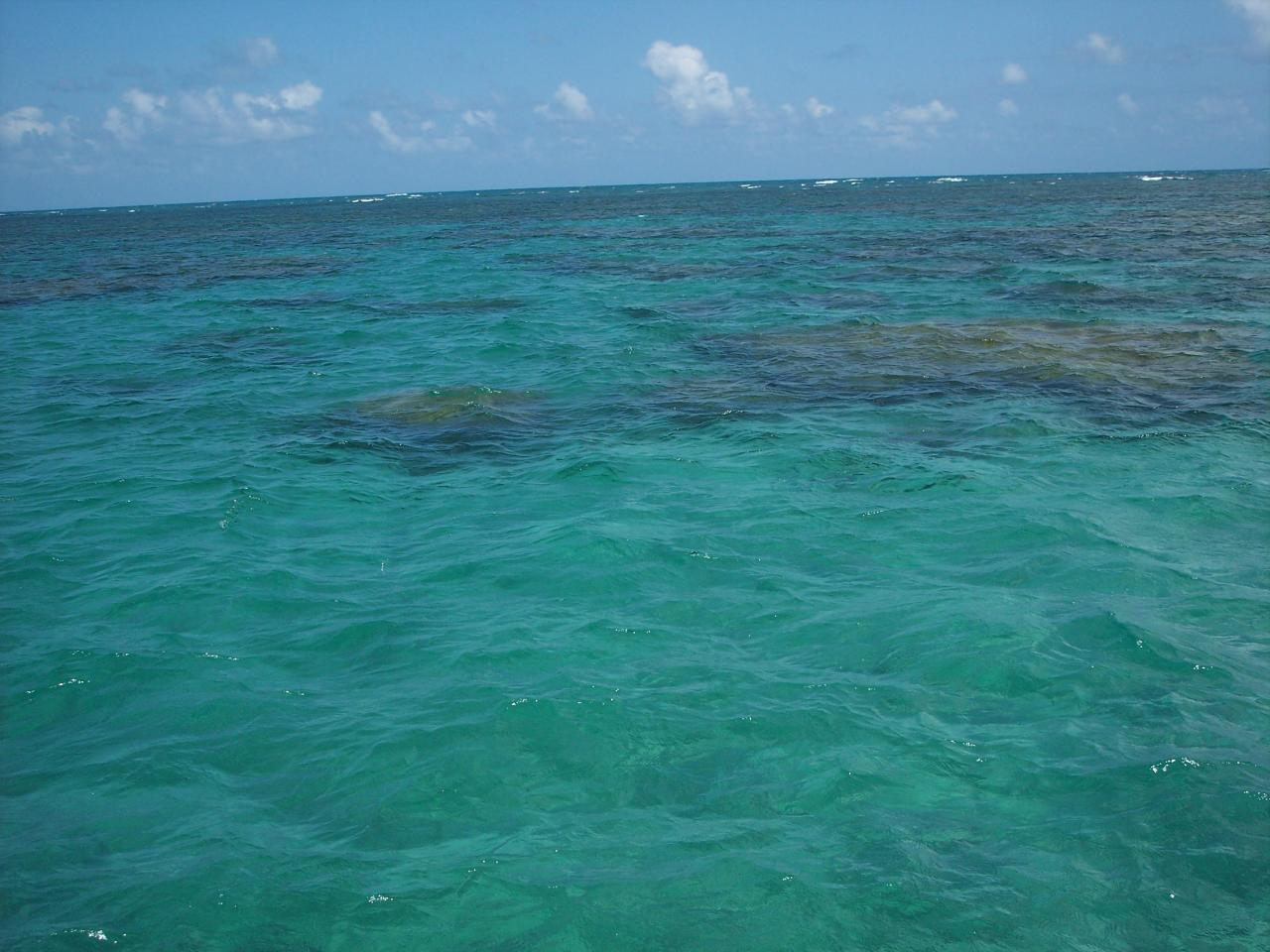
Parrachos de Maracajaú.

Maracajaú is known for coral formations locally called "Parrachos de Maracajaú" located to 7 kilometers of the coast that form natural pools of crystalline waters.

On the beach water park is located Manoa Park.
