= Morro do Careca =

Coordinates: 5.88555°S 35.1634°W

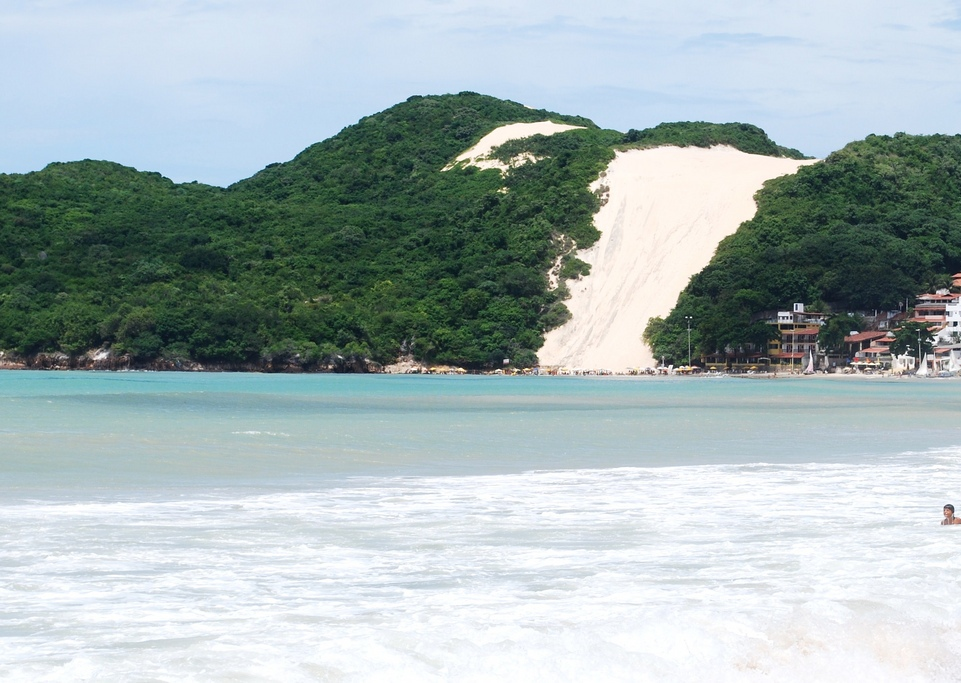
Morro do Careca.

The Morro do Careca (lit. "Bald Hill") is a large dune located in the city of Natal in Brazil. It is the main symbol and a common sight on tourist postcards of the city and the state of Rio Grande do Norte. It has a height of 120 metres (390 ft), with a margin determined by vegetation. It is located in the extreme south of Ponta Negra – the capital's most famous beach.

In the past Morro do Careca was a spot for recreation and entertainment. The bathers and tourists would climb up the hill and come down with the help of a device called skibunda. Since the end of the 1990s, it has been closed to visitors. The reason for the closure is the dune's protection; the preservation of forest will aid in safeguarding against erosion, ensuring that the sand does not slip and thus reduce the height of the hill. At present, all activity on the dune remains suspended.
