= Ponta Negra =

Beach in Natal, Brazil

Coordinates: 5°52′52″S 35°10′16″W

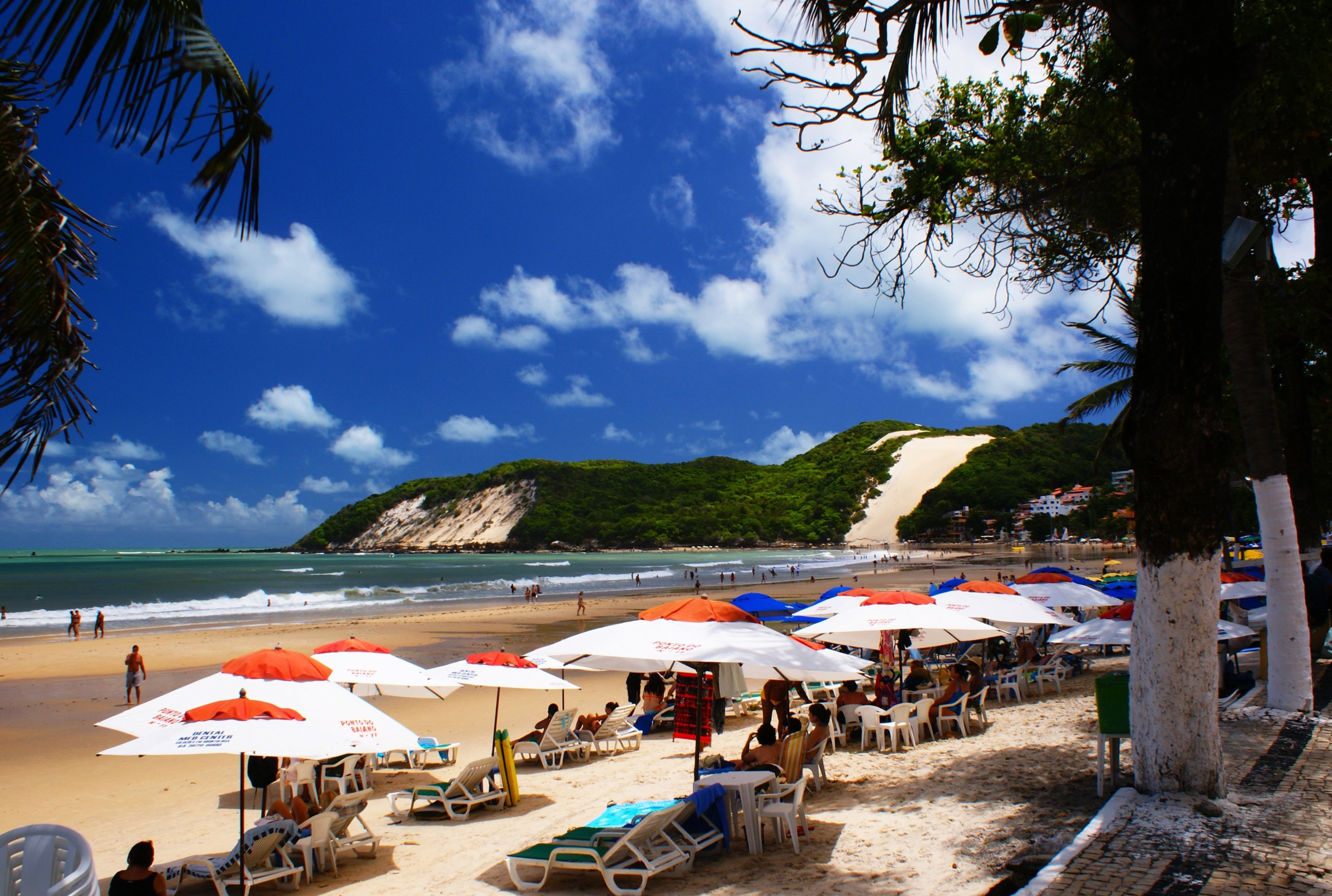
Ponta Negra beach and Morro do Careca.

Ponta Negra (Portuguese: Black Tip) is a beach and neighborhood located in the Brazilian city of Natal, the capital of the state of Rio Grande do Norte. Located in the extreme south of the beach is the Morro do Careca (Portuguese: Bald Man's Hill), a large dune and a landmark of the city. Located in the extreme north of the beach is the Via Costeira (Coastal Way), a coastal road that connects Ponta Negra with several other beaches of the city, such as Areia Preta and Praia dos Artistas.

The beach is completely urbanized and there are several shops, restaurants, bars, night clubs, and hotels. The sand itself is lined with "tents", or huts, called barracas, which serve food and drinks. A common sight on the beach are jangadas, simple, multicolored, local fishing boats typical of northeastern Brazil.
