= Caiçara do Norte =

Municipality in Rio Grande do Norte, Brazil

- Municipality
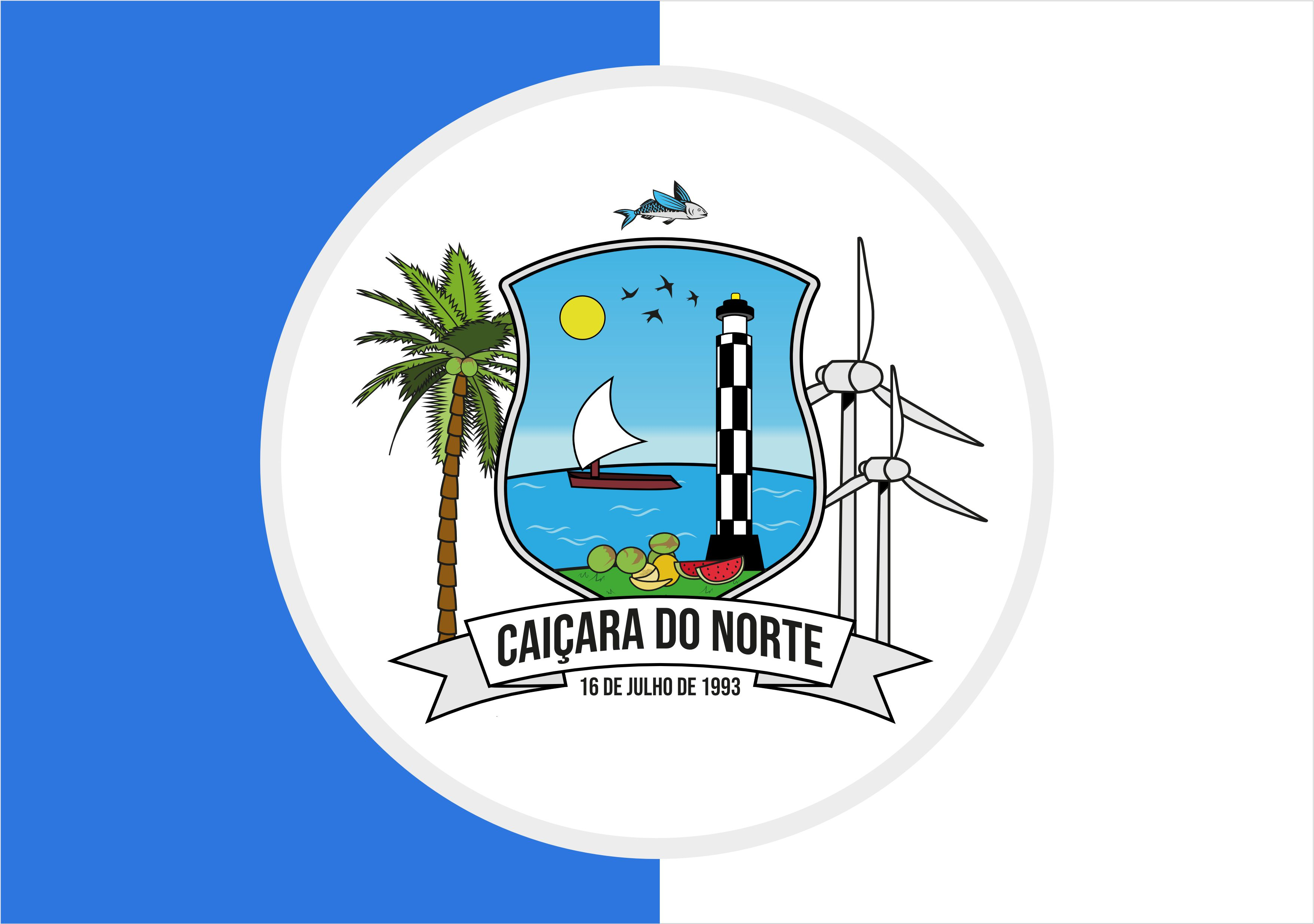
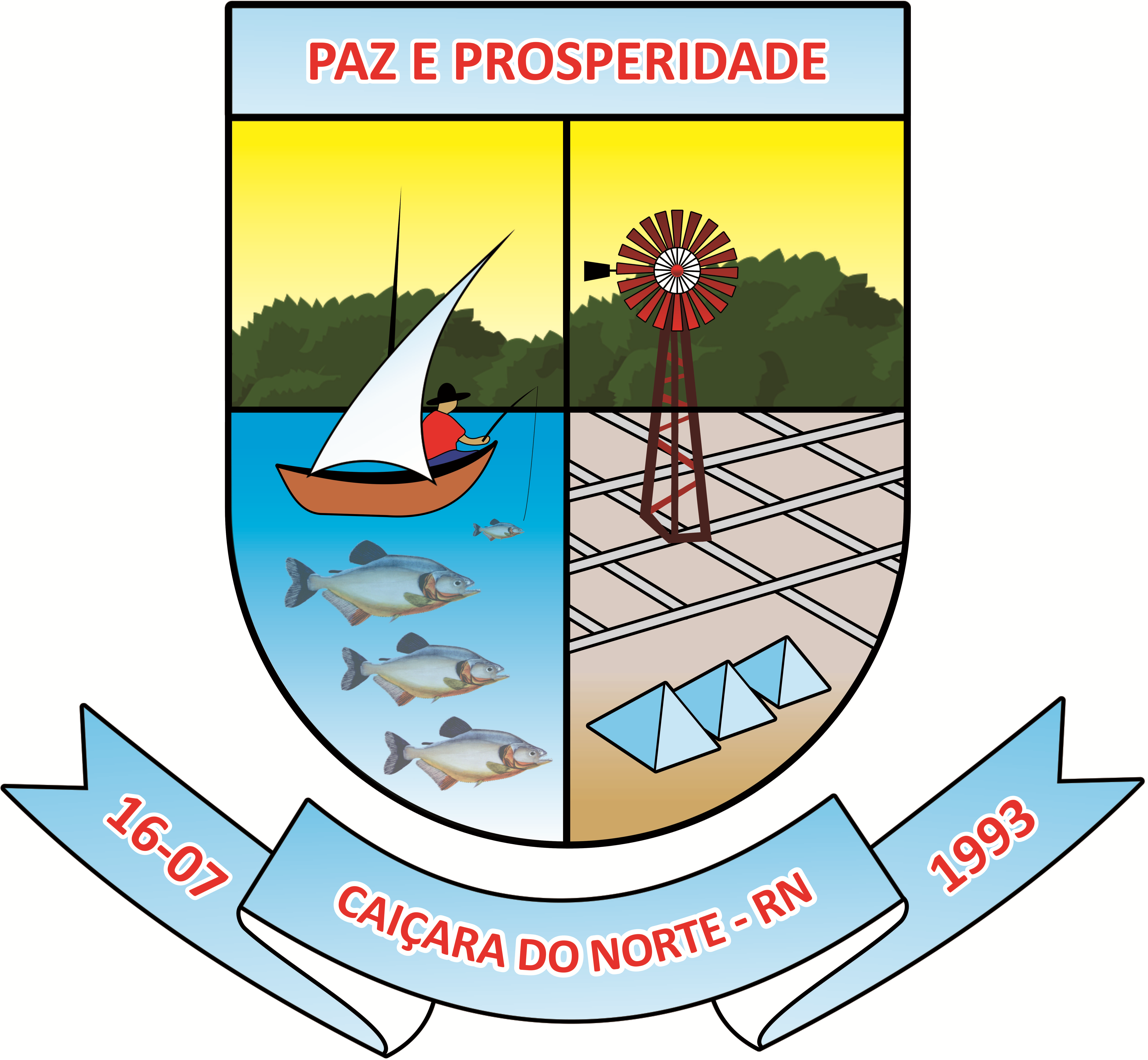
- Flag Coat of arms

- Location in Brazil
- Coordinates: 5.135°S 35.985°W
- Country: Brazil
- Region: Nordeste
- State: Rio Grande do Norte
- Mesoregion: Central Potiguar

Population (2022)
  - Total: 6,293
- Time zone: UTC−3 (BRT)

Caiçara do Norte is a municipality in the state of Rio Grande do Norte in the Northeast region of Brazil. It has an area of 225.633 square kilometers (87.117 sq mi), of which 1.6812 square kilometres (0.6491 sq mi) is urban. It is located 134 km from Natal, the state capital, and 1,759 km from Brasília, the federal capital. Its population in the 2022 demographic census was 6,293 inhabitants, according to the Brazilian Institute of Geography and Statistics (IBGE), ranking as the 97th most populous municipality in the state of Rio Grande do Norte.

== Geography ==
The territory of Caiçara do Norte covers 225.633 square kilometers (87.117 sq mi), of which 1.6812 square kilometres (0.6491 sq mi) constitutes the urban area. It sits at an average altitude of 0 meters above sea level. Caiçara do Norte borders these municipalities: to the south, Jandaíra and Parazinho; to the east, São Bento do Norte; and to the west, Galinhos. The city is located 124 km from the state capital Natal, and 1,759 km from the federal capital Brasília.

Under the territorial division established in 2017 by the Brazilian Institute of Geography and Statistics (IBGE), the municipality belongs to the immediate geographical region of João Camara, within the intermediate region of Natal. Previously, under the microregion and mesoregion divisions, it was part of the microregion of Macau in the mesoregion of Central Potiguar.

== Demographics ==
In the 2022 census, the municipality had a population of 6,293 inhabitants and ranked 97th in the state that year (out of 167 municipalities), with 51.12% male and 48.88% female, resulting in a sex ratio of 104.58 (10,458 men for every 10,000 women), compared to 6,016 inhabitants in the 2010 census (97.97% living in the urban area), when it held the 99th state position. Between the 2010 and 2022 censuses, the population of Caiçara do Norte changed at an annual geometric growth rate of 0%. Regarding age group in the 2022 census, 67.5% of the inhabitants were between 15 and 64 years old, 23.44% were under fifteen, and 9.07% were 65 or older. The population density in 2022 was 27.89 inhabitants per square kilometer. There were 1,976 housing units with an average of 3.18 inhabitants per household.

The municipality's Human Development Index (HDI-M) was considered medium, according to data from the United Nations Development Programme (UNDP). According to the 2010 report published in 2013, its value was 0.574, ranking 142nd in the state and 4,764th nationally (out of 5,565 municipalities), and the Gini coefficient rose from 0.34 in 2003 to 0.53 in 2010. Considering only the longevity index, its value is 0.727, the income index is 0.572, and the education index is 0.454.

== See also ==
- List of municipalities in Rio Grande do Norte
