= Maxaranguape =

Municipality in Rio Grande do Norte, Brazil

Coordinates: 5.51583°S 35.2619°W

- Municipality
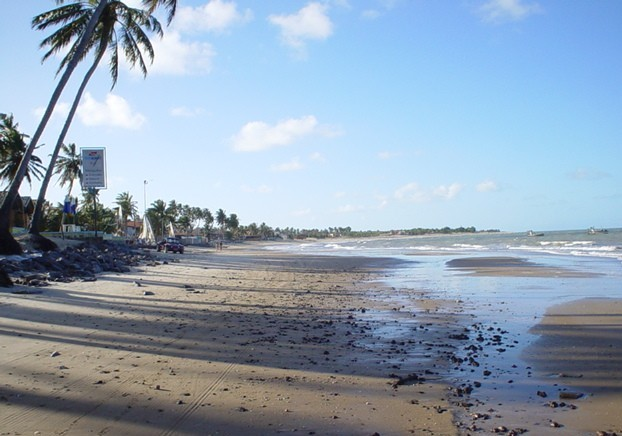
- Maracajaú beach.

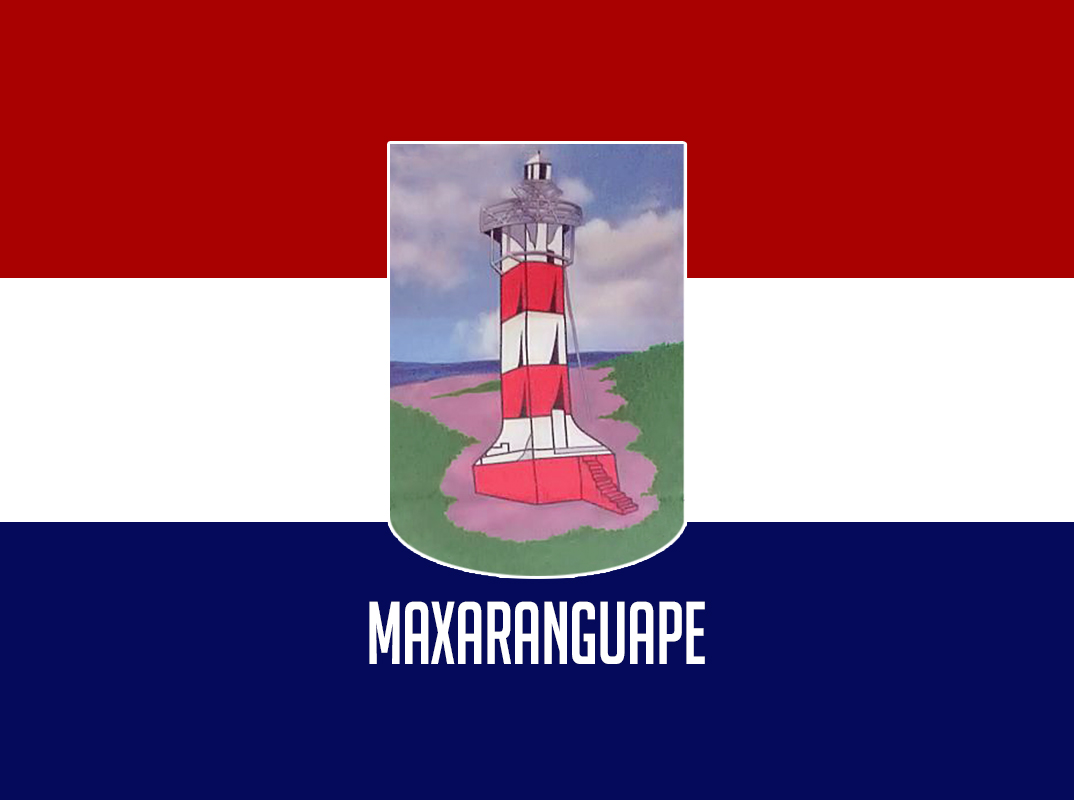
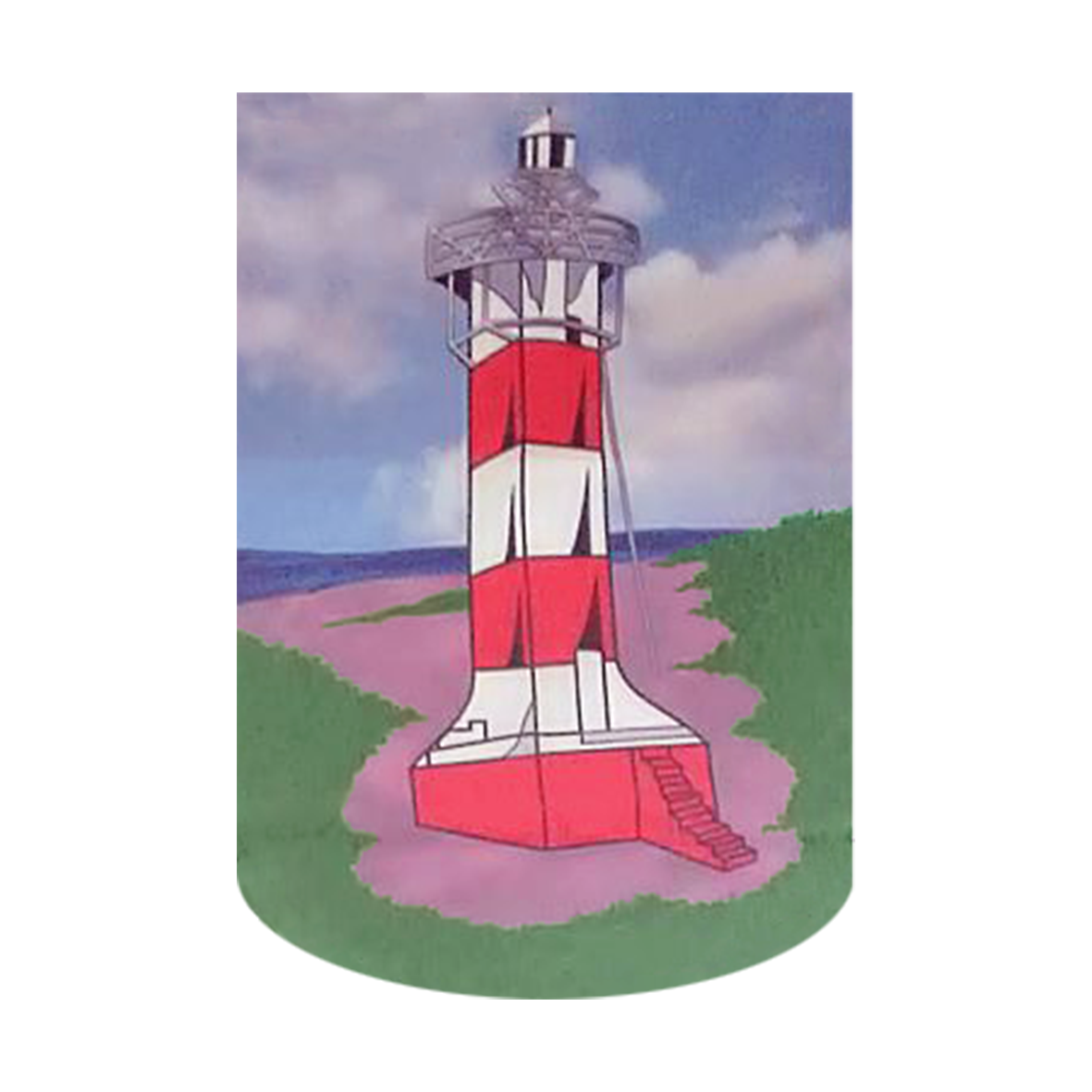
- Flag Coat of arms
- Interactive map of Maxaranguape
- Country: Brazil
- Region: Nordeste
- State: Rio Grande do Norte
- Mesoregion: Leste Potiguar

Population (2020)
  - Total: 12,544
- Time zone: UTC−3 (BRT)

Maxaranguape is a municipality in the state of Rio Grande do Norte in the Northeast region of Brazil.

== See also ==
- List of municipalities in Rio Grande do Norte
