= Guamaré =

Municipality in Rio Grande do Norte, Brazil

Coordinates: 5°06′S 36°19′W

- Municipality
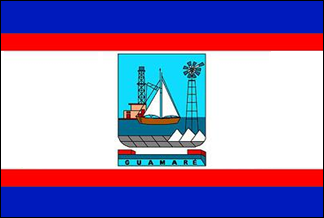
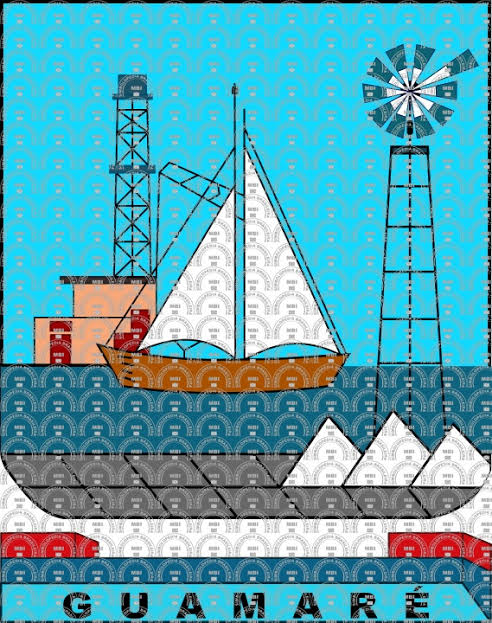
- Flag Coat of arms
- Interactive map of Guamaré
- Country: Brazil
- Region: Nordeste
- State: Rio Grande do Norte
- Mesoregion: Central Potiguar

Population (2020)
  - Total: 15,963
- Time zone: UTC−3 (BRT)

Guamaré is a municipality in the state of Rio Grande do Norte in the Northeast region of Brazil.

Douglas Júnior, one of the key players in Kazakhstan's journey to fourth place in the 2021 FIFA Futsal World Cup, was born there.

== See also ==
- List of municipalities in Rio Grande do Norte
