= Galinhos =

Municipality in Rio Grande do Norte, Brazil

Coordinates: 5.11389°S 36.28°W

- Municipality
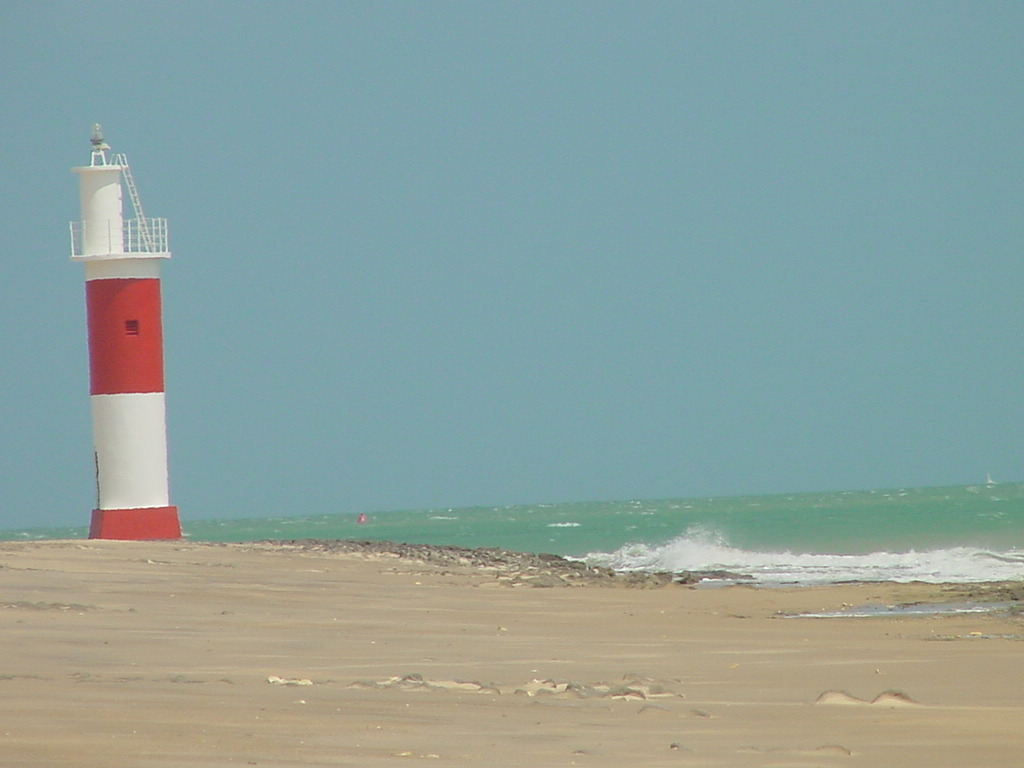
- Galinhos Lighthouse.

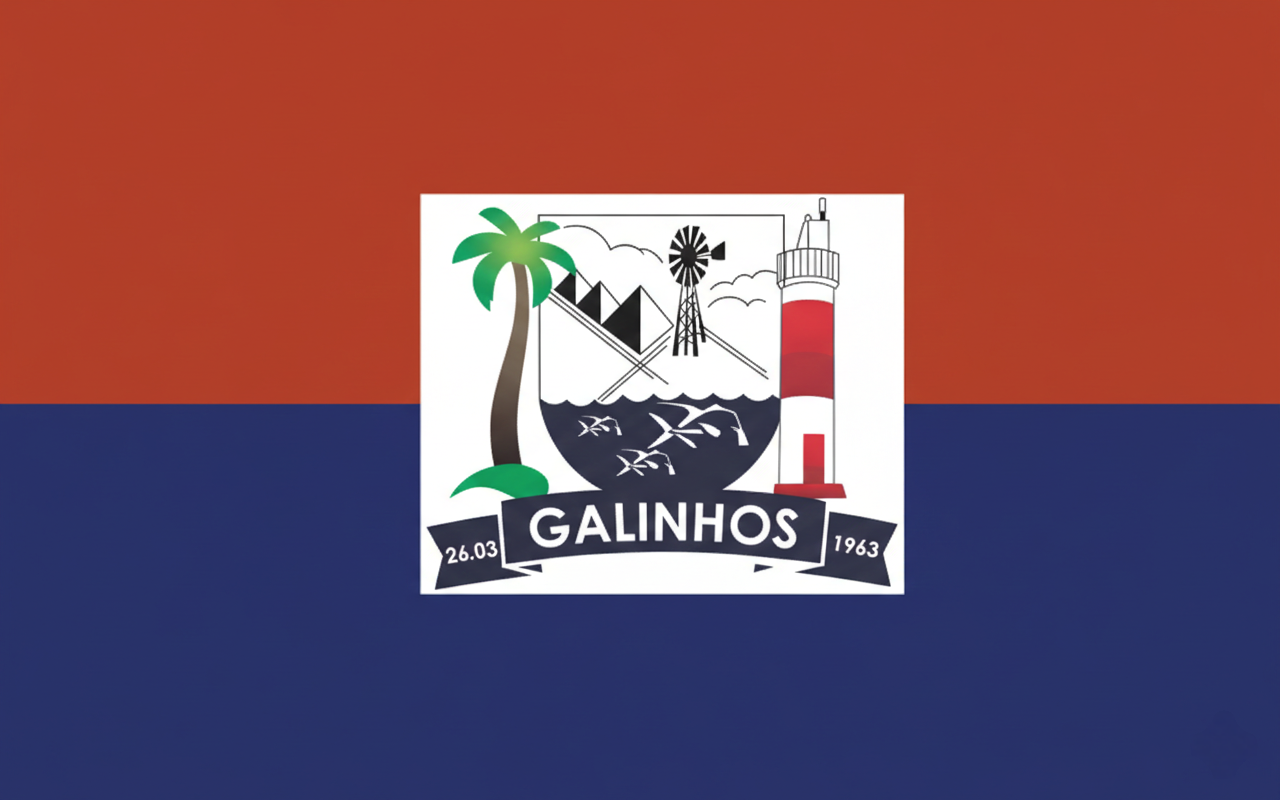
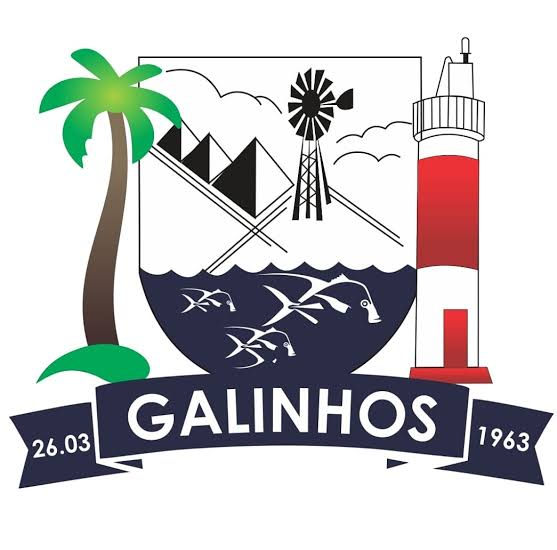
- Flag Coat of arms

- Country: Brazil
- Region: Nordeste
- State: Rio Grande do Norte
- Mesoregion: Central Potiguar

Population (2020)
  - Total: 2,845
- Time zone: UTC−3 (BRT)

Galinhos is a municipality in the state of Rio Grande do Norte in the Northeast region of Brazil.

== See also ==
- List of municipalities in Rio Grande do Norte
