= List of municipalities in Rio Grande do Norte =

A map of the official subdivisions of Rio Grande do Norte

Rio Grande do Norte (English: Great River of the North) is a state located in the Northeast Region of Brazil. According to the 2010 Census conducted by the Brazilian Institute of Geography and Statistics (IBGE), Rio Grande do Norte has a population of 3,168,133 inhabitants over 52,797 square kilometres (20,385 sq mi), which makes it the 16th largest state by population and the 22nd largest by area, out of 26 states. It is home to cities such as Natal, Mossoró, and São Gonçalo do Amarante.

The land that became Rio Grande do Norte was a donatário to João de Barros, the factor of the House of India and Mina, from John III of Portugal in 1535; prior to that, the Portuguese Crown owned the land. The French, who trafficked Brazil wood in the area, had a foothold on the land until the Portuguese expelled them in 1598. The Dutch took the land in 1634 as a part of Dutch Brazil and reigned until 1654, when they were defeated by the Portuguese. In 1701, Rio Grande do Norte joined the Captaincy of Pernambuco, and became a province in 1822 and a state of Brazil in 1889.

Rio Grande do Norte is divided into 167 municipalities, which are grouped into four mesoregions and 23 microregions. Of the 167 municipalities, Natal has the highest population, with 803,811 inhabitants, while Viçosa, with 1,618 inhabitants, has the lowest. The largest municipality by area is Mossoró, with an area of 2,110 square kilometres (815 sq mi); the smallest is Senador Georgino Avelino, named after the former Senator and Rio Grande do Norte Governor José Georgino Avelino, which covers an area of 26 square kilometres (10 sq mi).

== Municipalities ==
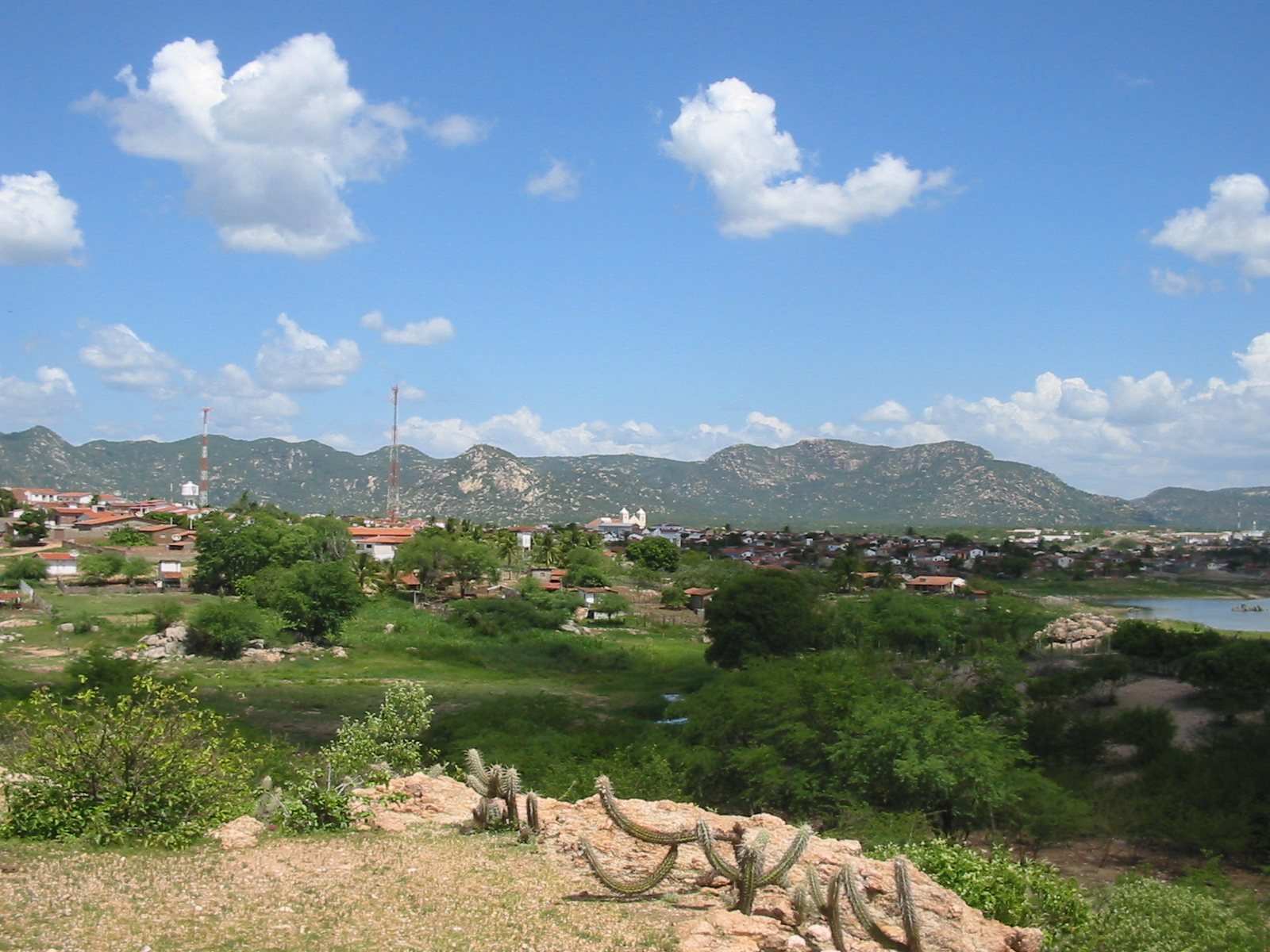
Acari

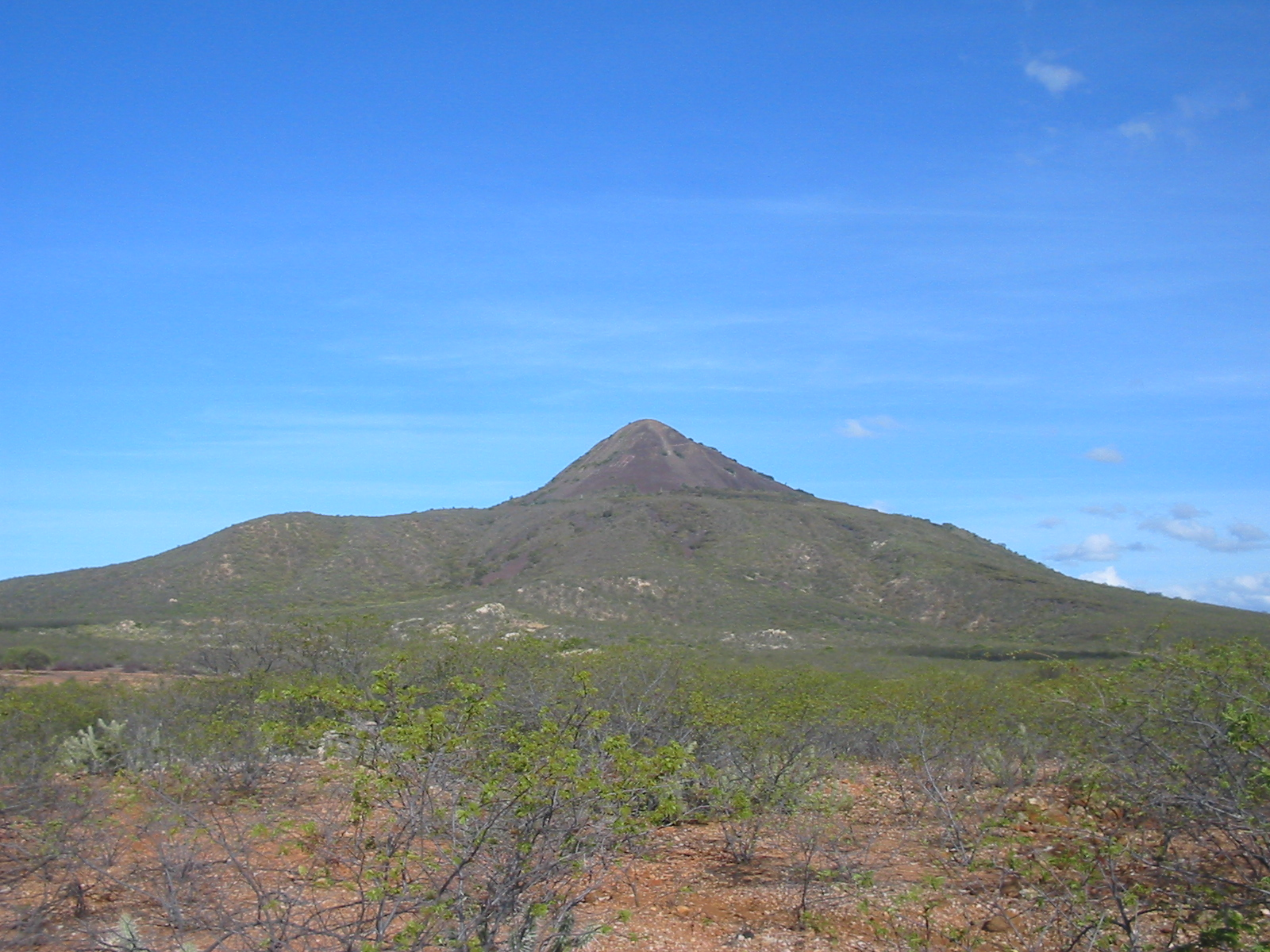
Pico do Cabugi, an extinct volcano in Angicos

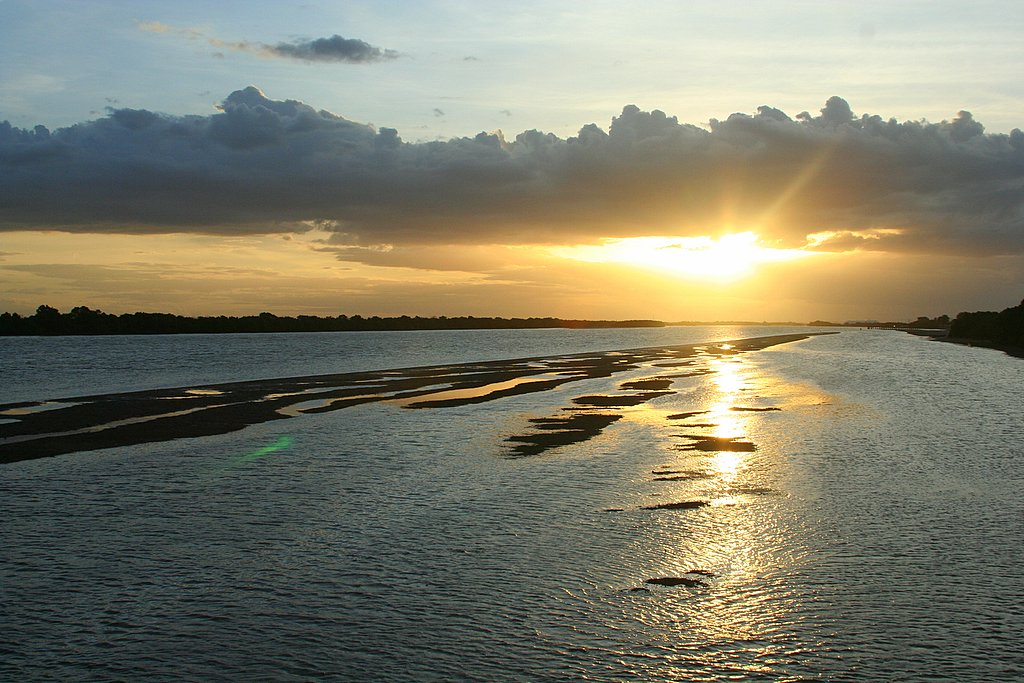
The Piranhas River in Macau

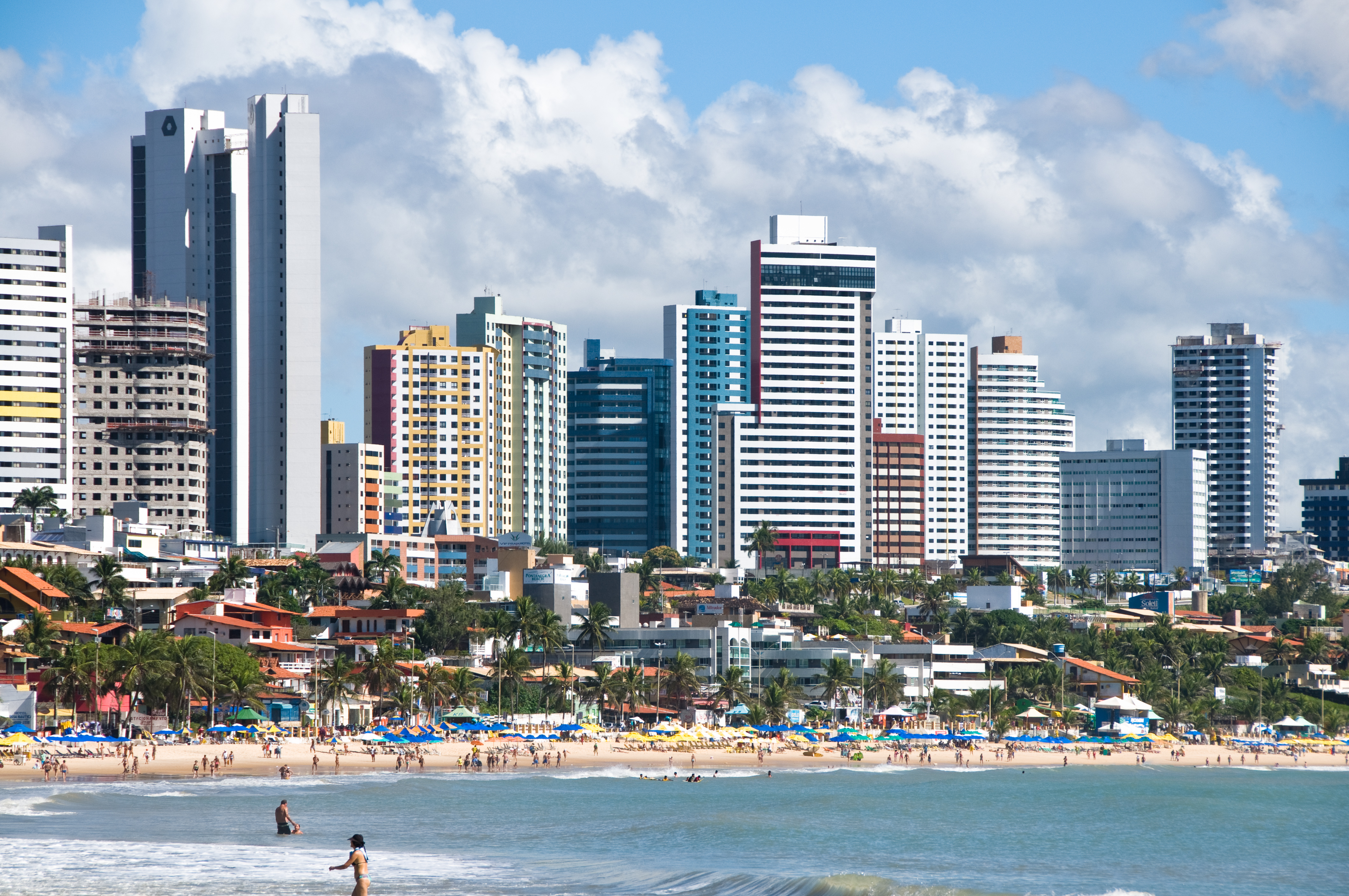
Natal, the capital of Rio Grande do Norte

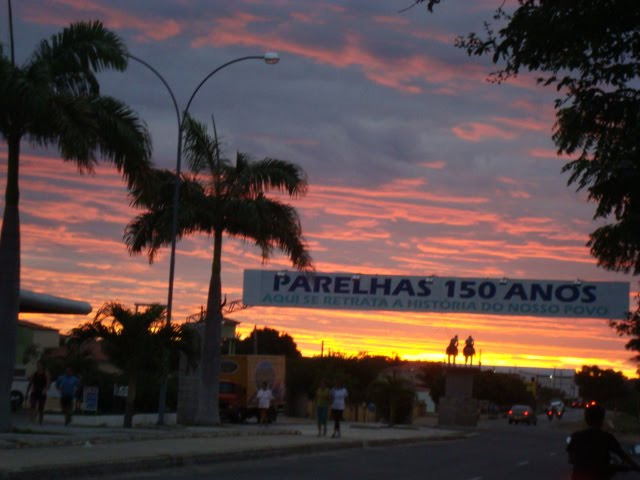
Parelhas celebrating the 150th anniversary of its founding

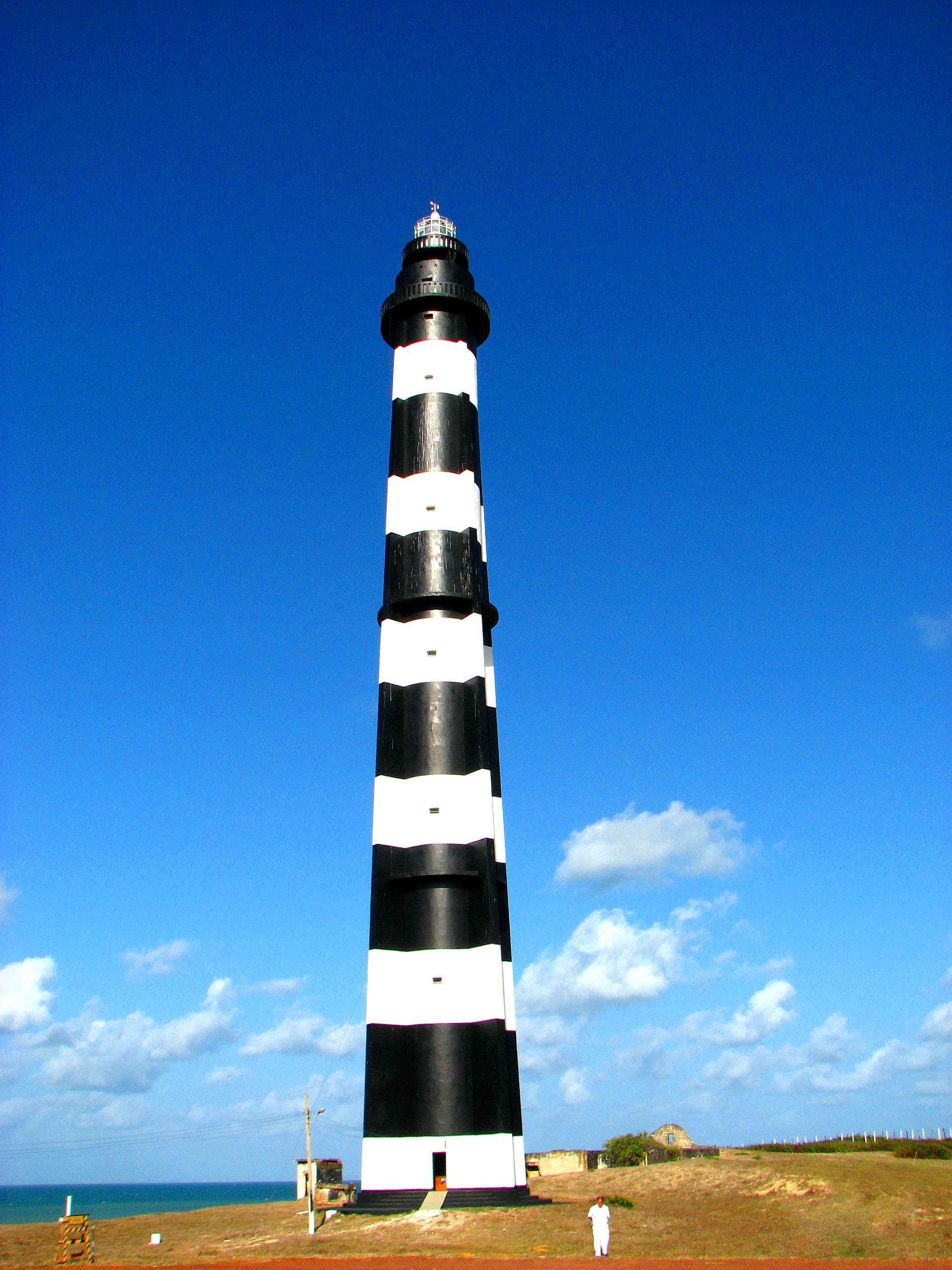
The Calcanhar Lighthouse, the largest traditional lighthouse in Brazil, located in Touros

| Map (coordinates) | Municipality | Area (square kilometers) (square miles) | Population | Mesoregion | Microregion |
|---|---|---|---|---|---|
| 6°26′8″S 36°38′20″W | Acari | 608.565 (234.967) | 11,035 | Central Potiguar | Seridó Oriental |
| 5°29′54″S 36°30′20″W | Afonso Bezerra | 576.248 (222.489) | 10,879 | Central Potiguar | Angicos |
| 6°12′33″S 38°17′50″W | Água Nova | 50.683 (19.569) | 2,984 | Oeste Potiguar | Serra de São Miguel |
| 6°24′45″S 38°0′57″W | Alexandria | 381.202 (147.182) | 13,475 | Oeste Potiguar | Pau dos Ferros |
| 6°9′8″S 37°45′58″W | Almino Afonso | 128.029 (49.432) | 4,880 | Oeste Potiguar | Umarizal |
| 5°17′18″S 36°45′44″W | Alto do Rodrigues | 191.311 (73.865) | 12,306 | Oeste Potiguar | Vale do Açu |
| 5°39′56″S 36°36′4″W | Angicos | 741.654 (286.353) | 11,553 | Central Potiguar | Angicos |
| 6°12′46″S 37°54′20″W | Antônio Martins | 244.620 (94.448) | 6,907 | Oeste Potiguar | Umarizal |
| 5°39′51″S 37°47′56″W | Apodi | 1,602.659 (618.787) | 34,777 | Oeste Potiguar | Chapada do Apodi |
| 4°57′22″S 37°8′13″W | Areia Branca | 357.580 (138.062) | 25,263 | Oeste Potiguar | Mossoró |
| 6°11′40″S 35°9′37″W | Arês | 112.584 (43.469) | 12,931 | Leste Potiguar | Litoral Sul |
| 5°34′36″S 36°54′31″W | Assu | 1,269.235 (490.052) | 53,245 | Oeste Potiguar | Vale do Açu |
| 6°22′10″S 35°0′28″W | Baía Formosa | 245.510 (94.791) | 8,569 | Leste Potiguar | Litoral Sul |
| 5°4′48″S 37°37′0″W | Baraúna | 825.802 (318.842) | 24,187 | Oeste Potiguar | Mossoró |
| 5°52′2″S 35°55′35″W | Barcelona | 152.629 (58.930) | 3,957 | Agreste Potiguar | Borborema Potiguar |
| 5°41′38″S 35°49′11″W | Bento Fernandes | 301.075 (116.245) | 5,110 | Agreste Potiguar | Baixa Verde |
| 6°9′30″S 35°36′2″W | Boa Saúde | 187.211 (72.282) | 9,009 | Agreste Potiguar | Agreste Potiguar |
| 5°59′18″S 36°24′47″W | Bodó | 253.513 (97.881) | 2,425 | Central Potiguar | Serra de Santana |
| 5°59′2″S 35°34′53″W | Bom Jesus | 122.033 (47.117) | 9,432 | Agreste Potiguar | Agreste Potiguar |
| 6°11′27″S 35°21′24″W | Brejinho | 58.528 (22.598) | 11,577 | Agreste Potiguar | Agreste Potiguar |
| 5°3′52″S 36°3′21″W | Caiçara do Norte | 189.415 (73.133) | 6,016 | Central Potiguar | Macau |
| 5°45′37″S 35°59′54″W | Caiçara do Rio do Vento | 261.191 (100.846) | 3,304 | Central Potiguar | Angicos |
| 6°27′30″S 37°5′52″W | Caicó | 1,228.574 (474.352) | 62,727 | Central Potiguar | Seridó Ocidental |
| 5°51′50″S 37°18′36″W | Campo Grande | 896.962 (346.317) | 9,289 | Oeste Potiguar | Médio Oeste |
| 6°14′29″S 36°10′57″W | Campo Redondo | 213.629 (82.482) | 10,266 | Agreste Potiguar | Borborema Potiguar |
| 6°22′48″S 35°7′44″W | Canguaretama | 245.529 (94.799) | 30,900 | Leste Potiguar | Litoral Sul |
| 5°47′33″S 37°33′24″W | Caraúbas | 1,095.001 (422.780) | 19,582 | Oeste Potiguar | Chapada do Apodi |
| 6°33′20″S 36°35′42″W | Carnaúba dos Dantas | 245.648 (94.845) | 7,429 | Central Potiguar | Seridó Oriental |
| 5°20′24″S 36°50′24″W | Carnaubais | 529.835 (204.569) | 9,775 | Oeste Potiguar | Vale do Açu |
| 5°38′4″S 35°25′2″W | Ceará-Mirim | 739.686 (285.593) | 67,844 | Leste Potiguar | Macaíba |
| 6°2′44″S 36°20′45″W | Cerro Corá | 393.569 (151.957) | 10,916 | Central Potiguar | Serra de Santana |
| 6°22′57″S 36°12′53″W | Coronel Ezequiel | 185.752 (71.719) | 5,405 | Agreste Potiguar | Borborema Potiguar |
| 6°15′35″S 38°26′37″W | Coronel João Pessoa | 117.140 (45.228) | 4,774 | Oeste Potiguar | Serra de São Miguel |
| 6°24′42″S 36°47′23″W | Cruzeta | 295.829 (114.220) | 7,968 | Central Potiguar | Seridó Oriental |
| 6°24′42″S 36°47′23″W | Currais Novos | 864.431 (333.757) | 42,668 | Central Potiguar | Seridó Oriental |
| 6°5′40″S 38°22′29″W | Doutor Severiano | 108.277 (41.786) | 6,495 | Oeste Potiguar | Serra de São Miguel |
| 6°6′38″S 38°18′19″W | Encanto | 125.747 (48.555) | 5,228 | Oeste Potiguar | Serra de São Miguel |
| 6°56′42″S 36°43′6″W | Equador | 264.983 (102.310) | 5,822 | Central Potiguar | Seridó Oriental |
| 6°19′56″S 35°18′34″W | Espírito Santo | 143.673 (55.472) | 10,480 | Leste Potiguar | Litoral Sul |
| 5°42′20″S 35°18′26″W | Extremoz | 125.665 (48.519) | 24,550 | Leste Potiguar | Natal |
| 5°36′9″S 37°41′19″W | Felipe Guerra | 268.427 (103.640) | 5,734 | Oeste Potiguar | Chapada do Apodi |
| 5°41′50″S 36°31′52″W | Fernando Pedroza | 322.540 (124.533) | 2,850 | Central Potiguar | Angicos |
| 6°7′38″S 36°49′5″W | Florânia | 504.022 (194.603) | 9,672 | Central Potiguar | Serra de Santana |
| 6°4′42″S 38°7′10″W | Francisco Dantas | 181.593 (70.113) | 2,874 | Oeste Potiguar | Pau dos Ferros |
| 6°9′30″S 37°53′23″W | Frutuoso Gomes | 63.278 (24.432) | 4,233 | Oeste Potiguar | Umarizal |
| 5°5′26″S 36°16′31″W | Galinhos | 342.442 (132.217) | 2,150 | Central Potiguar | Macau |
| 6°15′53″S 35°12′35″W | Goianinha | 192.227 (74.219) | 22,467 | Leste Potiguar | Litoral Sul |
| 5°27′32″S 37°31′15″W | Governador Dix-Sept Rosado | 1,129.373 (436.051) | 12,373 | Oeste Potiguar | Chapada do Apodi |
| 4°58′47″S 37°9′17″W | Grossos | 126.451 (48.823) | 9,393 | Oeste Potiguar | Mossoró |
| 5°6′27″S 36°19′13″W | Guamaré | 259.181 (100.070) | 12,431 | Central Potiguar | Macau |
| 5°49′27″S 35°33′10″W | Ielmo Marinho | 305.185 (117.832) | 12,188 | Agreste Potiguar | Agreste Potiguar |
| 5°29′54″S 36°51′18″W | Ipanguaçu | 374.239 (144.494) | 13,855 | Oeste Potiguar | Vale do Açu |
| 6°48′51″S 37°11′56″W | Ipueira | 127.347 (46.169) | 2,074 | Central Potiguar | Seridó Ocidental |
| 5°38′39″S 36°52′17″W | Itajá | 203.623 (78.619) | 6,952 | Oeste Potiguar | Vale do Açu |
| 5°50′23″S 37°59′24″W | Itaú | 133.032 (51.364) | 5,568 | Oeste Potiguar | Pau dos Ferros |
| 6°25′33″S 36°12′18″W | Jaçanã | 54.558 (21.065) | 7,925 | Agreste Potiguar | Borborema Potiguar |
| 5°21′23″S 36°7′41″W | Jandaíra | 435.678 (168.215) | 6,796 | Agreste Potiguar | Baixa Verde |
| 6°00′56″S 37°24′32″W | Janduís | 304.899 (117.722) | 5,350 | Oeste Potiguar | Médio Oeste |
| 6°27′54″S 35°56′48″W | Japi | 188.990 (72.969) | 5,522 | Agreste Potiguar | Borborema Potiguar |
| 5°39′13″S 35°58′8″W | Jardim de Angicos | 254.045 (98.087) | 2,607 | Central Potiguar | Angicos |
| 6°22′43″S 37°21′7″W | Jardim de Piranhas | 330.553 (127.627) | 13,511 | Central Potiguar | Seridó Ocidental |
| 6°35′4″S 36°46′28″W | Jardim do Seridó | 368.643 (142.333) | 12,115 | Central Potiguar | Seridó Oriental |
| 5°32′15″S 35°49′11″W | João Câmara | 714.951 (276.043) | 32,203 | Agreste Potiguar | Baixa Verde |
| 6°16′28″S 37°47′46″W | João Dias | 88.173 (34.044) | 2,601 | Oeste Potiguar | Umarizal |
| 6°19′0″S 38°16′53″W | José da Penha | 117.634 (45.418) | 5,868 | Oeste Potiguar | Pau dos Ferros |
| 6°2′2″S 37°1′13″W | Jucurutu | 933.718 (360.509) | 17,692 | Oeste Potiguar | Vale do Açu |
| 6°16′19″S 35°19′37″W | Jundiá | 45.261 (17.475) | 3,585 | Agreste Potiguar | Agreste Potiguar |
| 6°26′28″S 35°35′54″W | Lagoa d'Anta | 105.650 (40.791) | 6,227 | Agreste Potiguar | Agreste Potiguar |
| 6°8′57″S 35°26′16″W | Lagoa de Pedras | 117.660 (45.429) | 6,992 | Agreste Potiguar | Agreste Potiguar |
| 6°0′14″S 35°52′18″W | Lagoa de Velhos | 112.832 (43.564) | 2,632 | Agreste Potiguar | Borborema Potiguar |
| 6°7′16″S 35°28′38″W | Lagoa Nova | 176.299 (68.069) | 13,990 | Central Potiguar | Serra de Santana |
| 6°7′15″S 35°28′38″W | Lagoa Salgada | 79.515 (30.701) | 7,515 | Agreste Potiguar | Agreste Potiguar |
| 5°42′0″S 36°14′41″W | Lajes | 676.417 (261.165) | 10,385 | Central Potiguar | Angicos |
| 6°9′1″S 36°7′2″W | Lajes Pintadas | 120.308 (46.451) | 4,614 | Agreste Potiguar | Borborema Potiguar |
| 6°7′12″S 37°48′56″W | Lucrécia | 30.935 (11.944) | 3,633 | Oeste Potiguar | Umarizal |
| 6°24′50″S 38°23′19″W | Luís Gomes | 166.637 (64.235) | 9,612 | Oeste Potiguar | Serra de São Miguel |
| 5°51′30″S 35°21′14″W | Macaíba | 512.487 (197.871) | 69,538 | Leste Potiguar | Macaíba |
| 5°6′54″S 36°38′4″W | Macau | 788.022 (304.255) | 28,974 | Central Potiguar | Macau |
| 6°24′22″S 38°19′26″W | Major Sales | 31.971 (12.344) | 3,536 | Oeste Potiguar | Serra de São Miguel |
| 6°17′39″S 38°10′2″W | Marcelino Vieira | 345.707 (133.477) | 8,265 | Oeste Potiguar | Pau dos Ferros |
| 6°5′16″S 37°54′40″W | Martins | 169.446 (65.423) | 8,228 | Oeste Potiguar | Umarizal |
| 5°31′2″S 35°15′23″W | Maxaranguape | 131.300 (50.695) | 10,442 | Leste Potiguar | Litoral Nordeste |
| 6°4′44″S 37°30′15″W | Messias Targino | 135.094 (52.160) | 4,188 | Oeste Potiguar | Médio Oeste |
| 6°29′9″S 35°17′15″W | Montanhas | 82.213 (31.742) | 11,418 | Leste Potiguar | Litoral Sul |
| 6°4′4″S 35°19′56″W | Monte Alegre | 199.519 (77.034) | 20,670 | Agreste Potiguar | Agreste Potiguar |
| 6°26′29″S 35°46′57″W | Monte das Gameleiras | 71.945 (27.778) | 2,266 | Agreste Potiguar | Borborema Potiguar |
| 5°11′15″S 37°20′39″W | Mossoró | 2,110.207 (814.751) | 259,886 | Oeste Potiguar | Mossoró |
| 5°47′42″S 35°12′34″W | Natal | 170.298 (65.752) | 803,811 | Leste Potiguar | Natal |
| 6°5′28″S 35°12′31″W | Nísia Floresta | 306.051 (118.166) | 23,818 | Leste Potiguar | Macaíba |
| 6°28′41″S 35°26′2″W | Nova Cruz | 277.657 (107.203) | 35,541 | Agreste Potiguar | Agreste Potiguar |
| 5°57′23″S 37°42′20″W | Olho-d'Água do Borges | 141.170 (54.506) | 4,301 | Oeste Potiguar | Umarizal |
| 6°42′4″S 36°56′44″W | Ouro Branco | 253.300 (97.799) | 4,699 | Central Potiguar | Seridó Oriental |
| 6°29′11″S 38°18′47″W | Paraná | 81.390 (31.425) | 3,952 | Oeste Potiguar | Pau dos Ferros |
| 5°46′28″S 37°6′5″W | Paraú | 410.858 (158.632) | 3,862 | Oeste Potiguar | Médio Oeste |
| 5°13′23″S 35°50′18″W | Parazinho | 274.668 (106.057) | 4,845 | Agreste Potiguar | Baixa Verde |
| 6°41′16″S 36°39′27″W | Parelhas | 513.052 (198.089) | 20,670 | Central Potiguar | Seridó Ocidental |
| 5°54′56″S 35°15′46″W | Parnamirim | 120.202 (46.410) | 202,413 | Leste Potiguar | Natal |
| 6°26′8″S 35°38′36″W | Passa e Fica | 42.137 (16.269) | 11,111 | Agreste Potiguar | Agreste Potiguar |
| 6°16′44″S 35°22′39″W | Passagem | 41.235 (15.921) | 2,899 | Agreste Potiguar | Agreste Potiguar |
| 6°6′36″S 37°18′12″W | Patu | 319.932 (123.526) | 11,964 | Oeste Potiguar | Umarizal |
| 6°6′33″S 38°12′16″W | Pau dos Ferros | 259.960 (100.371) | 27,733 | Oeste Potiguar | Pau dos Ferros |
| 5°9′1″S 35°52′44″W | Pedra Grande | 221.429 (85.494) | 3,521 | Leste Potiguar | Litoral Nordeste |
| 5°34′57″S 36°6′17″W | Pedra Preta | 294.979 (113.891) | 2,583 | Central Potiguar | Angicos |
| 5°31′18″S 36°23′17″W | Pedro Avelino | 952.688 (367.833) | 7,168 | Central Potiguar | Angicos |
| 6°26′21″S 35°13′17″W | Pedro Velho | 192.707 (74.404) | 14,119 | Leste Potiguar | Litoral Sul |
| 5°15′36″S 36°43′20″W | Pendências | 419.141 (161.830) | 13,436 | Oeste Potiguar | Vale do Açu |
| 6°16′7″S 38°2′36″W | Pilões | 82.691 (31.927) | 3,453 | Oeste Potiguar | Pau dos Ferros |
| 5°37′22″S 35°39′46″W | Poço Branco | 230.730 (89.085) | 13,947 | Agreste Potiguar | Baixa Verde |
| 6°1′26″S 37°59′16″W | Portalegre | 110.052 (42.491) | 7,297 | Oeste Potiguar | Pau dos Ferros |
| 5°4′4″S 36°46′54″W | Porto do Mangue | 418.636 (161.635) | 5,217 | Oeste Potiguar | Vale do Açu |
| 5°28′1″S 35°33′22″W | Pureza | 504.317 (194.717) | 8,432 | Leste Potiguar | Litoral Nordeste |
| 6°11′41″S 38°13′33″W | Rafael Fernandes | 78.230 (30.205) | 4,692 | Oeste Potiguar | Pau dos Ferros |
| 6°4′32″S 37°43′0″W | Rafael Godeiro | 100.073 (38.638) | 3,070 | Oeste Potiguar | Umarizal |
| 5°56′11″S 37°56′47″W | Riacho da Cruz | 127.221 (49.120) | 3,165 | Oeste Potiguar | Pau dos Ferros |
| 6°15′48″S 38°18′56″W | Riacho de Santana | 128.104 (49.461) | 4,157 | Oeste Potiguar | Serra de São Miguel |
| 5°48′54″S 35°49′30″W | Riachuelo | 262.873 (101.495) | 7,067 | Agreste Potiguar | Agreste Potiguar |
| 5°16′22″S 35°22′59″W | Rio do Fogo | 150.282 (58.024) | 10,060 | Leste Potiguar | Litoral Nordeste |
| 5°47′17″S 38°3′36″W | Rodolfo Fernandes | 154.840 (59.784) | 4,417 | Oeste Potiguar | Pau dos Ferros |
| 5°52′53″S 35°56′5″W | Ruy Barbosa | 125.813 (48.576) | 3,595 | Agreste Potiguar | Borborema Potiguar |
| 6°13′46″S 36°1′22″W | Santa Cruz | 624.390 (241.077) | 35,759 | Agreste Potiguar | Borborema Potiguar |
| 5°50′23″S 35°41′43″W | Santa Maria | 219.572 (84.777) | 4,762 | Agreste Potiguar | Agreste Potiguar |
| 5°57′27″S 36°39′20″W | Santana do Matos | 1,420.313 (548.383) | 13,798 | Central Potiguar | Serra de Santana |
| 6°46′14″S 36°44′0″W | Santana do Seridó | 188.402 (72.742) | 2,526 | Central Potiguar | Seridó Oriental |
| 6°18′38″S 35°28′44″W | Santo Antônio | 301.052 (116.236) | 22,214 | Agreste Potiguar | Agreste Potiguar |
| 5°3′59″S 36°2′17″W | São Bento do Norte | 288.637 (111.443) | 2,974 | Central Potiguar | Macau |
| 6°20′30″S 36°5′14″W | São Bento do Trairi | 190.816 (73.674) | 3,909 | Agreste Potiguar | Borborema Potiguar |
| 6°22′35″S 37°11′4″W | São Fernando | 404.415 (156.145) | 3,401 | Central Potiguar | Seridó Ocidental |
| 5°58′30″S 38°9′6″W | São Francisco do Oeste | 75.550 (29.170) | 3,874 | Oeste Potiguar | Pau dos Ferros |
| 5°47′36″S 35°19′46″W | São Gonçalo do Amarante | 251.308 (97.030) | 87,700 | Leste Potiguar | Macaíba |
| 6°43′6″S 37°12′2″W | São João do Sabugi | 277.010 (106.954) | 5,914 | Central Potiguar | Seridó Ocidental |
| 6°4′29″S 35°14′16″W | São José de Mipibu | 293.877 (113.466) | 39,771 | Leste Potiguar | Macaíba |
| 5°47′36″S 35°42′50″W | São José do Campestre | 341.403 (131.816) | 12,359 | Agreste Potiguar | Borborema Potiguar |
| 6°26′57″S 36°52′40″W | São José do Seridó | 174.504 (67.376) | 4,231 | Central Potiguar | Seridó Oriental |
| 6°12′43″S 38°29′49″W | São Miguel | 171.690 (66.290) | 22,159 | Oeste Potiguar | Serra de São Miguel |
| 5°7′29″S 35°38′21″W | São Miguel do Gostoso | 342.445 (132.218) | 8,659 | Leste Potiguar | Litoral Nordeste |
| 5°53′42″S 35°45′46″W | São Paulo do Potengi | 240.435 (92.832) | 15,866 | Agreste Potiguar | Agreste Potiguar |
| 5°53′53″S 35°38′4″W | São Pedro | 195.238 (75.381) | 6,223 | Agreste Potiguar | Agreste Potiguar |
| 5°47′58″S 36°55′14″W | São Rafael | 469.096 (181.118) | 8,106 | Oeste Potiguar | Vale do Açu |
| 5°58′21″S 36°4′31″W | São Tomé | 862.577 (333.041) | 10,868 | Agreste Potiguar | Borborema Potiguar |
| 6°13′2″S 36°41′4″W | São Vicente | 197.814 (76.376) | 6,030 | Central Potiguar | Serra de Santana |
| 6°2′8″S 35°41′34″W | Senador Elói de Souza | 167.592 (64.707) | 5,645 | Agreste Potiguar | Agreste Potiguar |
| 6°9′46″S 35°7′21″W | Senador Georgino Avelino | 26.383 (10.186) | 3,924 | Leste Potiguar | Litoral Sul |
| 6°6′21″S 35°42′46″W | Serra Caiada | 167.348 (64.613) | 8,774 | Agreste Potiguar | Agreste Potiguar |
| 6°25′2″S 35°42′16″W | Serra de São Bento | 96.635 (37.311) | 5,746 | Agreste Potiguar | Borborema Potiguar |
| 5°10′12″S 37°1′46″W | Serra do Mel | 616.509 (238.034) | 10,281 | Oeste Potiguar | Mossoró |
| 6°39′56″S 37°23′50″W | Serra Negra do Norte | 562.935 (217.349) | 7,770 | Central Potiguar | Seridó Ocidental |
| 6°16′34″S 35°29′56″W | Serrinha | 193.352 (74.653) | 6,581 | Agreste Potiguar | Agreste Potiguar |
| 6°6′36″S 37°57′23″W | Serrinha dos Pintos | 122.644 (47.353) | 4,538 | Oeste Potiguar | Umarizal |
| 5°46′38″S 37°57′28″W | Severiano Melo | 157.833 (60.939) | 5,752 | Oeste Potiguar | Pau dos Ferros |
| 6°6′14″S 35°54′40″W | Sítio Novo | 213.470 (82.421) | 5,020 | Agreste Potiguar | Borborema Potiguar |
| 5°55′48″S 38°2′42″W | Taboleiro Grande | 124.094 (47.913) | 2,317 | Oeste Potiguar | Pau dos Ferros |
| 5°37′18″S 35°35′48″W | Taipu | 352.818 (136.223) | 11,836 | Leste Potiguar | Litoral Nordeste |
| 6°11′58″S 35°48′6″W | Tangará | 156.780 (60.533) | 14,175 | Agreste Potiguar | Borborema Potiguar |
| 6°27′54″S 38°10′47″W | Tenente Ananias | 223.670 (86.359) | 9,911 | Oeste Potiguar | Pau dos Ferros |
| 6°8′53″S 36°43′9″W | Tenente Laurentino Cruz | 74.376 (28.717) | 5,406 | Central Potiguar | Serra de Santana |
| 4°50′14″S 37°15′9″W | Tibau | 162.407 (62.705) | 3,687 | Oeste Potiguar | Mossoró |
| 6°11′12″S 35°5′31″W | Tibau do Sul | 101.793 (39.302) | 11,402 | Leste Potiguar | Litoral Sul |
| 6°27′54″S 37°16′28″W | Timbaúba dos Batistas | 135.450 (52.297) | 2,295 | Central Potiguar | Seridó Ocidental |
| 5°11′56″S 35°27′39″W | Touros | 839.351 (324.073) | 31,076 | Leste Potiguar | Litoral Nordeste |
| 5°52′1″S 37°11′19″W | Triunfo Potiguar | 268.706 (103.747) | 3,366 | Oeste Potiguar | Médio Oeste |
| 5°59′26″S 37°48′52″W | Umarizal | 213.582 (82.464) | 10,669 | Oeste Potiguar | Umarizal |
| 5°38′31″S 37°15′28″W | Upanema | 811.806 (313.438) | 12,985 | Oeste Potiguar | Médio Oeste |
| 6°20′53″S 35°22′33″W | Várzea | 67.245 (25.963) | 5,227 | Agreste Potiguar | Agreste Potiguar |
| 6°19′35″S 38°29′3″W | Venha-Ver | 71.622 (27.653) | 3,821 | Oeste Potiguar | Serra de São Miguel |
| 6°2′39″S 35°25′42″W | Vera Cruz | 92.117 (35.566) | 10,725 | Agreste Potiguar | Agreste Potiguar |
| 5°59′40″S 37°56′40″W | Viçosa | 37.905 (14.635) | 1,618 | Oeste Potiguar | Pau dos Ferros |
| 6°18′52″S 35°4′38″W | Vila Flor | 47.656 (18.340) | 2,872 | Leste Potiguar | Litoral Sul |

== See also ==
- Geography of Brazil
- List of cities in Brazil
