= Rodolfo Fernandes =

Rodolfo Fernandes may refer to:

- Rodolfo Fernandes, Rio Grande do Norte, municipality
- Rodolfo Fernandes (politician), Indian politician
