= Viçosa =

Viçosa is Portuguese-language placename:

- Nova Viçosa, Bahia, Brazil
- Viçosa, Alagoas, Brazil
- Viçosa, Minas Gerais, Brazil
- Viçosa, Rio Grande do Norte, Brazil
- Viçosa do Ceará, Ceará, Brazil
- Vila Viçosa, Portugal
