= Ouro Branco =

Ouro Branco is a Portuguese phrase meaning "white gold". It may refer to the following places in Brazil:

- Ouro Branco, Alagoas
- Ouro Branco, Minas Gerais
- Ouro Branco, Rio Grande do Norte
