= Jandaíra, Rio Grande do Norte =

Municipality in Rio Grande do Norte, Brazil

Coordinates: 5°21′21″S 36°07′40″W

- Municipality
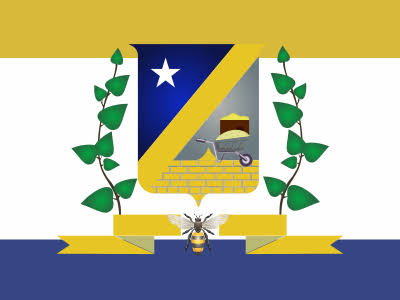
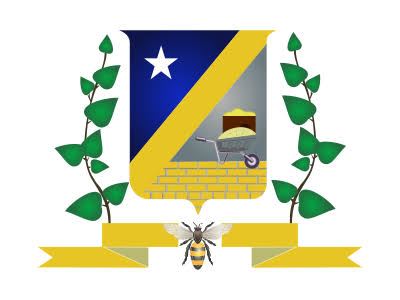
- Flag Coat of arms
- Interactive map of Jandaíra, Rio Grande do Norte
- Country: Brazil
- Region: Nordeste
- State: Rio Grande do Norte
- Mesoregion: Agreste Potiguar

Population (2020)
  - Total: 6,893
- Time zone: UTC−3 (BRT)

Jandaíra is a municipality in the state of Rio Grande do Norte in the Northeast region of Brazil.

== See also ==
- List of municipalities in Rio Grande do Norte
