= Espírito Santo, Rio Grande do Norte =

Municipality in Rio Grande do Norte, Brazil

Coordinates: 6°19′55″S 35°18′32″W

- Municipality
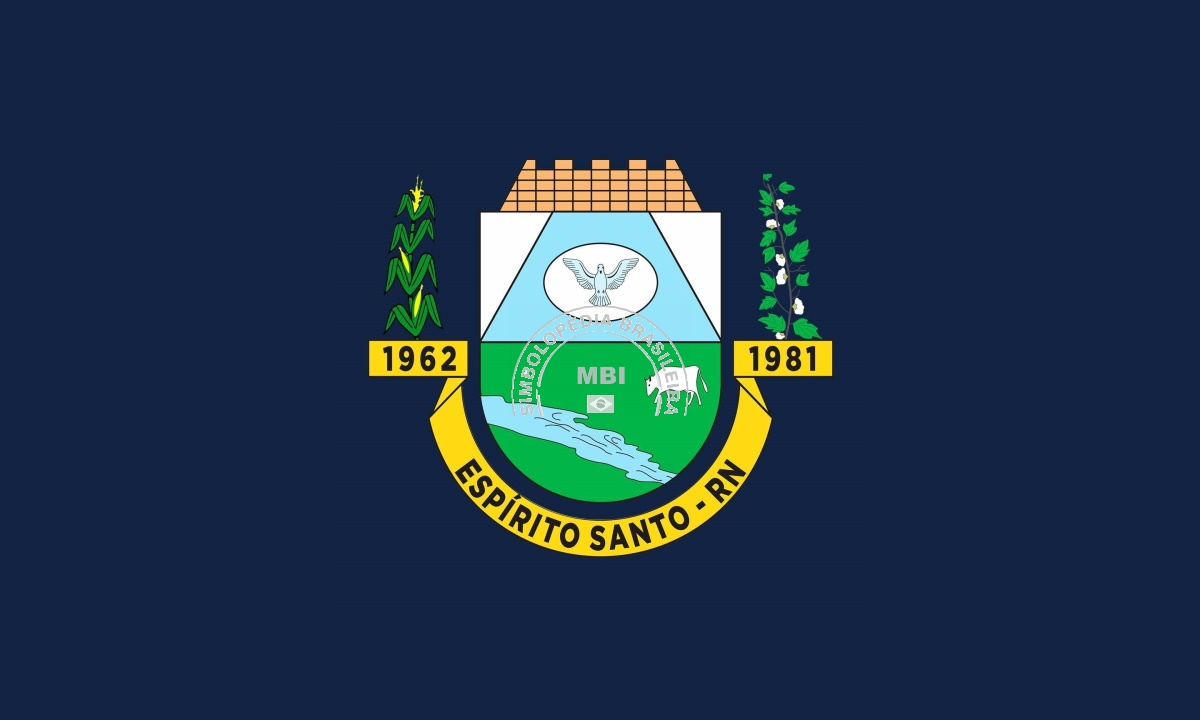
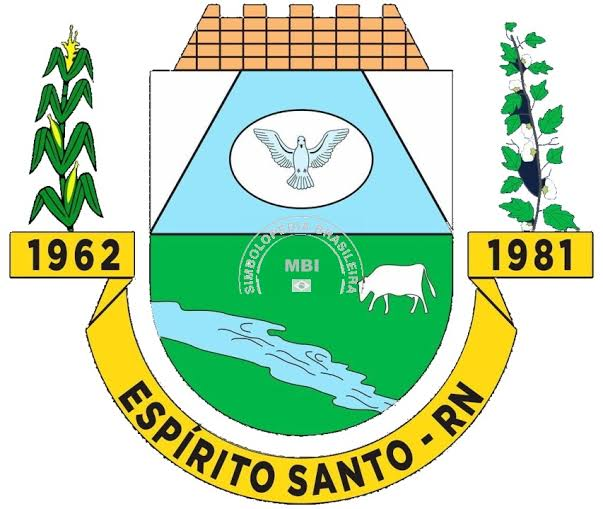
- Flag Coat of arms
- Interactive map of Espírito Santo, Rio Grande do Norte
- Country: Brazil
- Region: Nordeste
- State: Rio Grande do Norte
- Mesoregion: Leste Potiguar

Population (2020)
  - Total: 10,484
- Time zone: UTC -3

Espírito Santo is a municipality in the state of Rio Grande do Norte in the Northeast region of Brazil.

== See also ==
- List of municipalities in Rio Grande do Norte
