= Messias Targino =

Municipality in Rio Grande do Norte, Brazil

Coordinates: 6.07889°S 37.5139°W

- Municipality
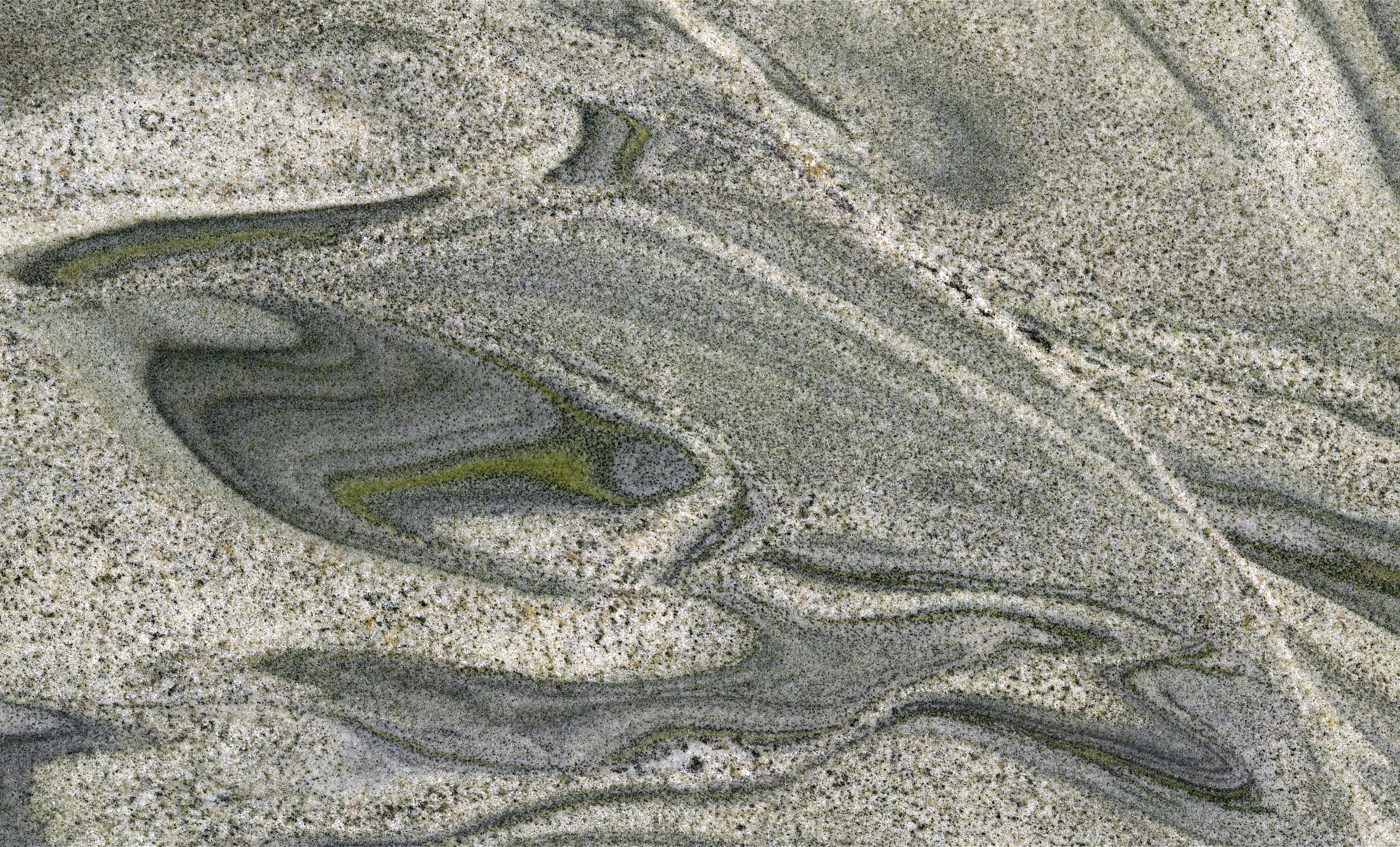
- Iguana Green "Granite" (gneiss), polished stone from a quarry near Messias Targino

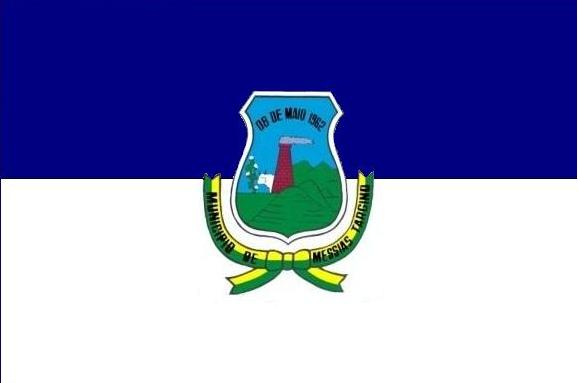
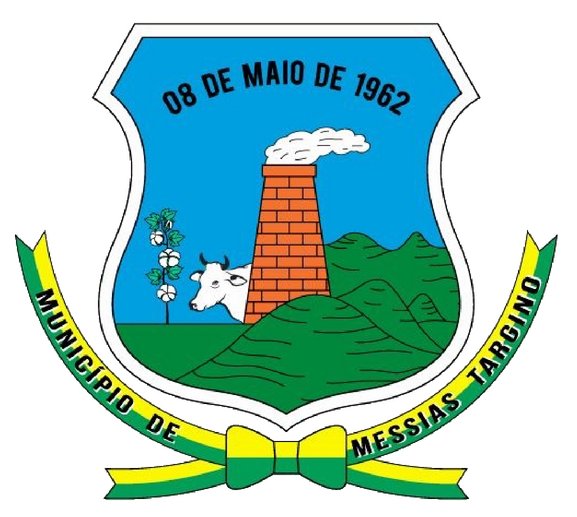
- Flag Coat of arms
- Interactive map of Messias Targino
- Country: Brazil
- Region: Nordeste
- State: Rio Grande do Norte
- Mesoregion: Oeste Potiguar

Population (2020)
  - Total: 4,634
- Time zone: UTC−3 (BRT)

Messias Targino is a municipality in the state of Rio Grande do Norte in the Northeast region of Brazil.

== See also ==
- List of municipalities in Rio Grande do Norte
