= Serra de São Bento =

Municipality in Rio Grande do Norte, Brazil

Coordinates: 6°25′S 35°38′W

- Municipality
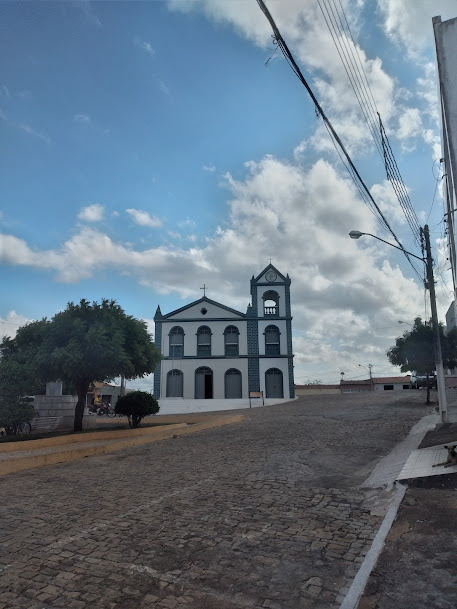

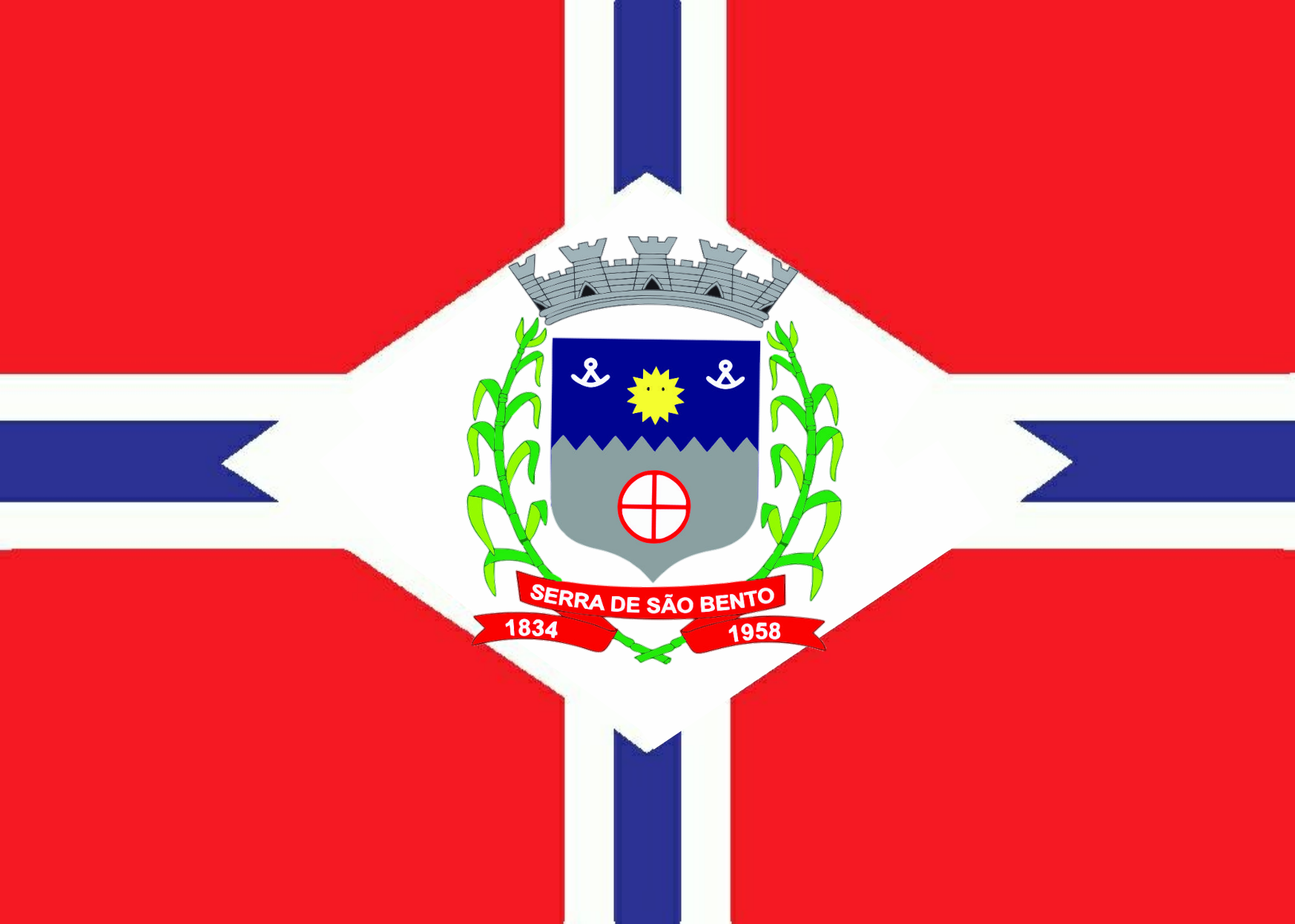
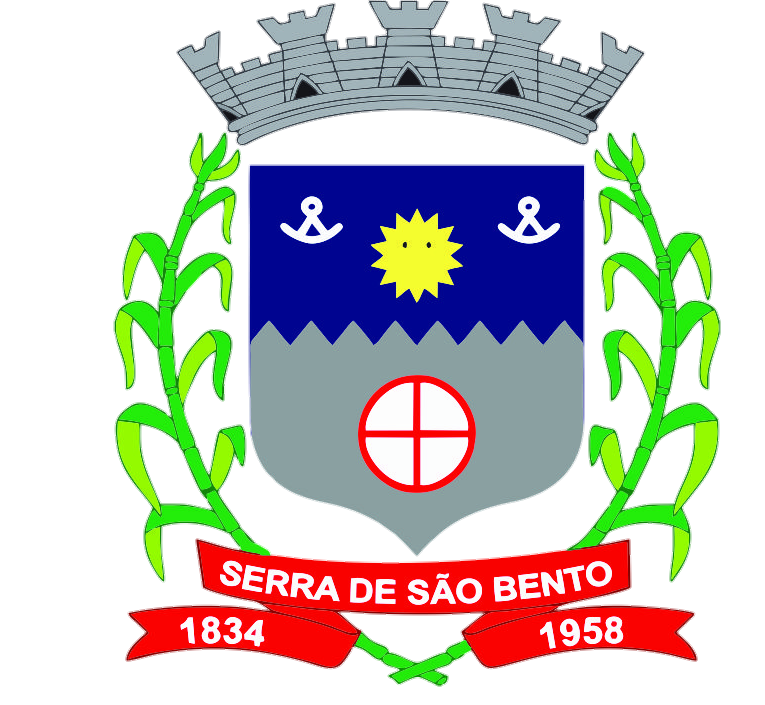
- Flag Coat of arms
- Interactive map of Serra de São Bento
- Country: Brazil
- Region: Nordeste
- State: Rio Grande do Norte
- Mesoregion: Agreste Potiguar

Population (2020)
  - Total: 5,751
- Time zone: UTC−3 (BRT)

Serra de São Bento is a municipality located in the south-central area of the state of Rio Grande do Norte in the Northeast region of Brazil.

== See also ==
- List of municipalities in Rio Grande do Norte
