= Monte das Gameleiras =

Municipality in Rio Grande do Norte, Brazil

Coordinates: 6.44083°S 35.7828°W

- Municipality
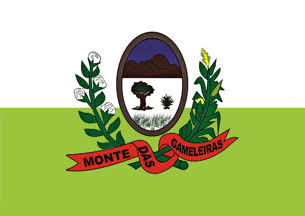
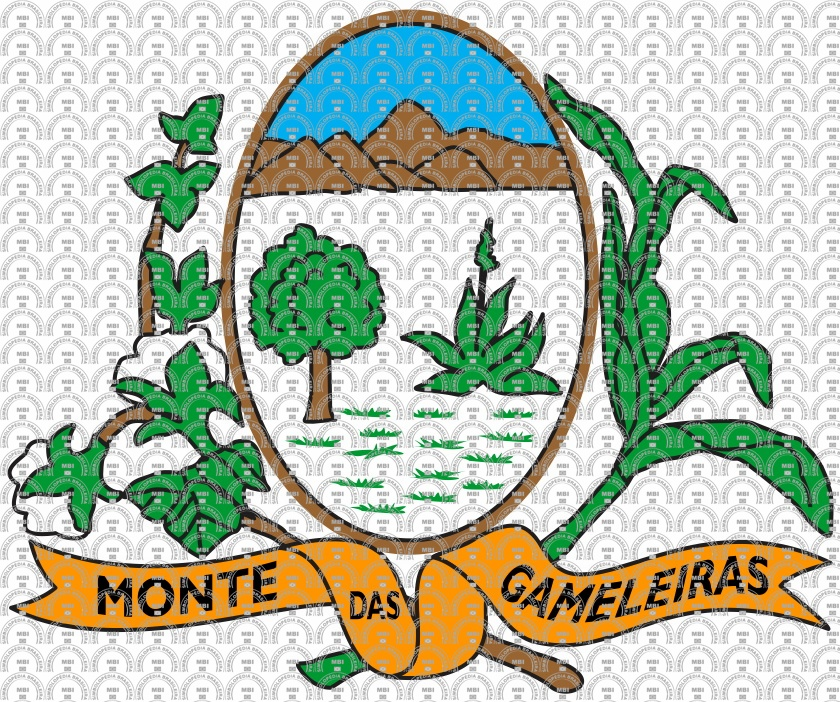
- Flag Coat of arms
- Interactive map of Monte das Gameleiras
- Country: Brazil
- Region: Nordeste
- State: Rio Grande do Norte
- Mesoregion: Agreste Potiguar

Population (2020)
  - Total: 2,084
- Time zone: UTC−3 (BRT)

Monte das Gameleiras is a municipality in the state of Rio Grande do Norte in the Northeast region of Brazil.

== See also ==
- List of municipalities in Rio Grande do Norte
