= Riachuelo, Rio Grande do Norte =

Municipality in Rio Grande do Norte, Brazil

Coordinates: 5°48′54″S 35°49′30″W

- Municipality
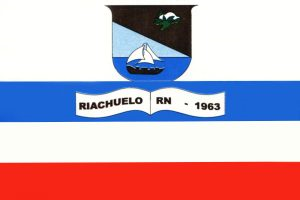
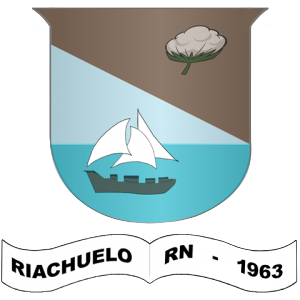
- Flag Coat of arms
- Interactive map of Riachuelo, Rio Grande do Norte
- Country: Brazil
- Region: Nordeste
- State: Rio Grande do Norte
- Mesoregion: Agreste Potiguar

Population (2020)
  - Total: 8,220
- Time zone: UTC−3 (BRT)

Riachuelo is a municipality in the state of Rio Grande do Norte in the Northeast region of Brazil.

== See also ==
- List of municipalities in Rio Grande do Norte
