= Taboleiro Grande =

Municipality in Rio Grande do Norte, Brazil

Coordinates: 05°55′48″S 38°02′42″W

- Municipality
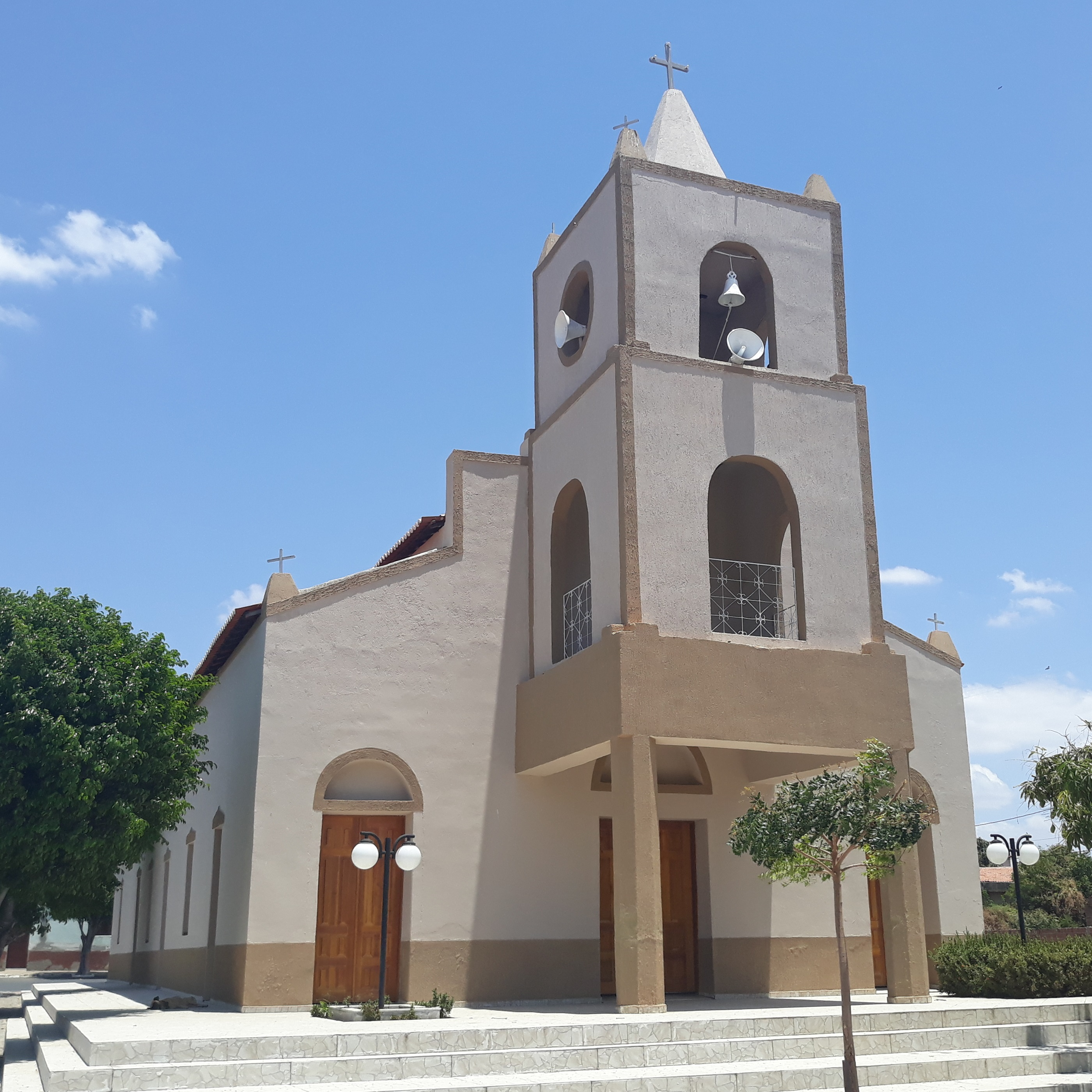

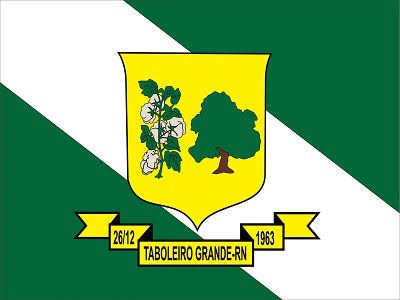
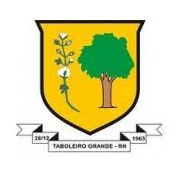
- Flag Coat of arms
- Interactive map of Taboleiro Grande
- Country: Brazil
- Region: Nordeste
- State: Rio Grande do Norte
- Mesoregion: Oeste Potiguar

Population (2020)
  - Total: 2,586
- Time zone: UTC−3 (BRT)

Taboleiro Grande is a municipality in the state of Rio Grande do Norte in the Northeast region of Brazil.

== See also ==
- List of municipalities in Rio Grande do Norte
