= Rafael Godeiro =

Municipality in Rio Grande do Norte, Brazil

- Municipality
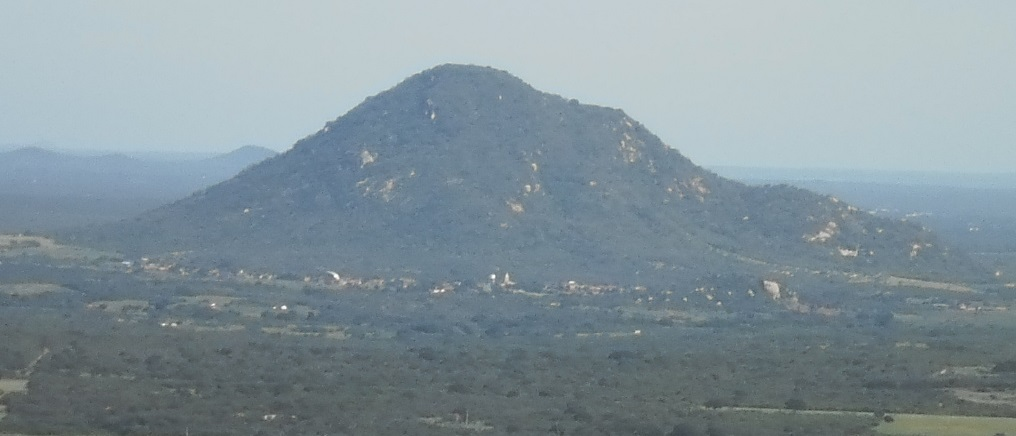

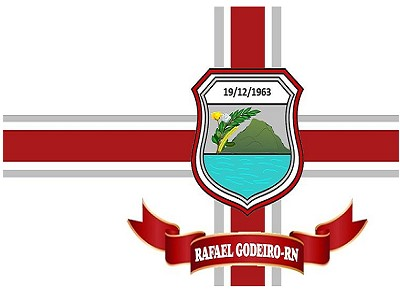
- Flag Coat of arms
- Interactive map of Rafael Godeiro
- Coordinates: 6°04′33″S 37°43′00″W
- Country: Brazil
- Region: Nordeste
- State: Rio Grande do Norte
- Mesoregion: Oeste Potiguar

Population (2020)
  - Total: 3,208
- Time zone: UTC−3 (BRT)

Rafael Godeiro (Brazilian Portuguese pronunciation: [ʁafaˈɛw ɡoˈdejɾu]) is a municipality in the state of Rio Grande do Norte in the Northeast region of Brazil.

== See also ==
- List of municipalities in Rio Grande do Norte
