= Pedra Preta, Rio Grande do Norte =

Municipality in Rio Grande do Norte, Brazil

Coordinates: 5°34′58″S 36°06′18″W

- Municipality
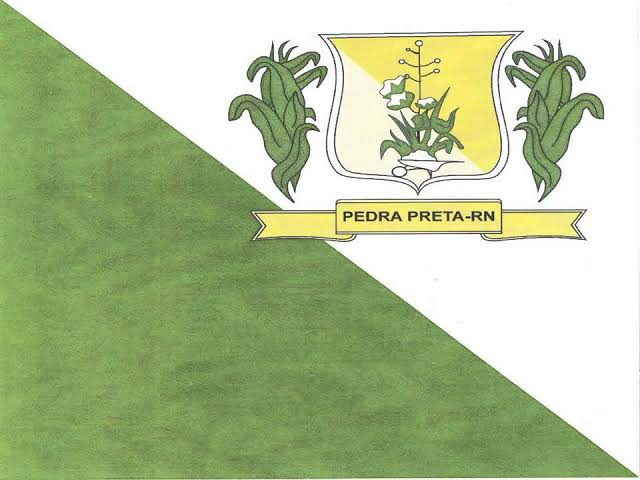
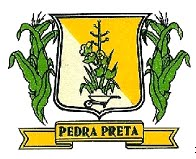
- Flag Coat of arms
- Interactive map of Pedra Preta, Rio Grande do Norte
- Country: Brazil
- Region: Nordeste
- State: Rio Grande do Norte
- Mesoregion: Central Potiguar

Population (2020)
  - Total: 2,438
- Time zone: UTC−3 (BRT)

Pedra Preta is a municipality in the state of Rio Grande do Norte in the Northeast region of Brazil.

== See also ==
- List of municipalities in Rio Grande do Norte
