= Olho-d'Água do Borges =

Municipality in Rio Grande do Norte, Brazil

Coordinates: 5.95583°S 37.7058°W

- Municipality
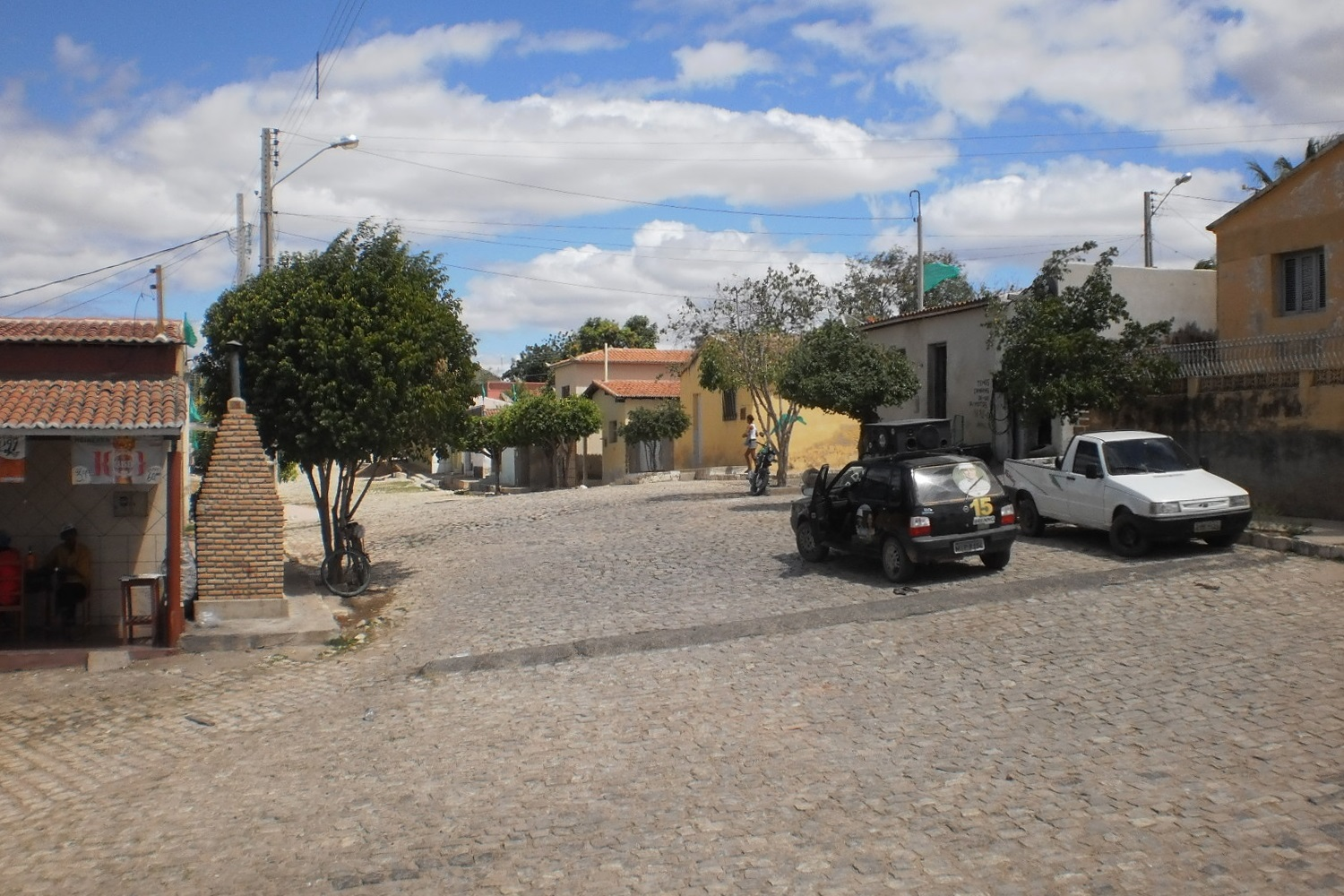

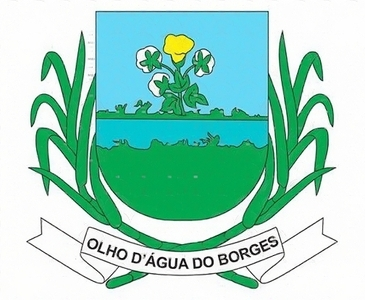
- Flag Coat of arms
- Interactive map of Olho-d'Água do Borges
- Country: Brazil
- Region: Nordeste
- State: Rio Grande do Norte
- Mesoregion: Oeste Potiguar

Population (2020)
  - Total: 4,244
- Time zone: UTC−3 (BRT)

Olho-d'Água do Borges is a municipality in the state of Rio Grande do Norte in the Northeast region of Brazil.

== See also ==
- List of municipalities in Rio Grande do Norte
