= São Vicente, Rio Grande do Norte =

Municipality in Rio Grande do Norte, Brazil

Coordinates: 6°12′57″S 36°41′02″W

São Vicente
- Municipality
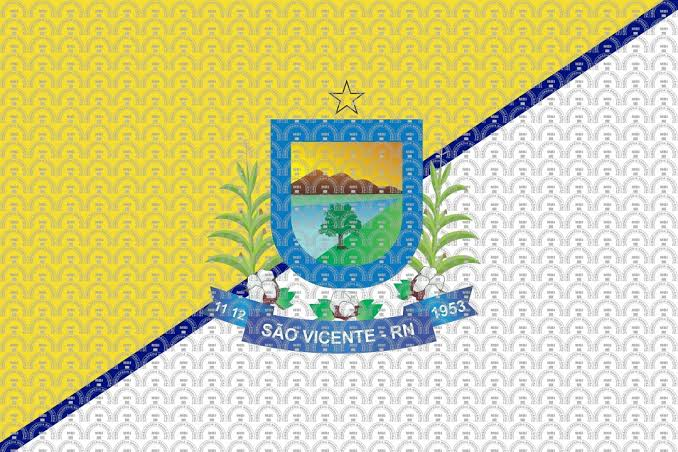
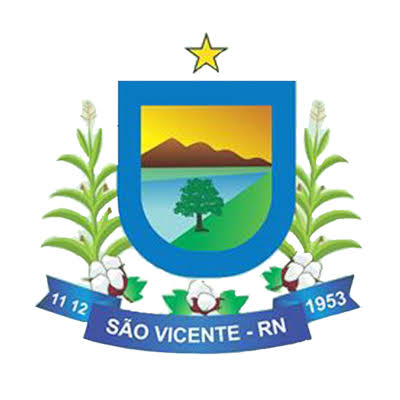
- Flag Coat of arms
- Interactive map of São Vicente
- Country: Brazil
- Region: Nordeste
- State: Rio Grande do Norte
- Mesoregion: Central Potiguar

Population (2020)
  - Total: 6,450
- Time zone: UTC−3 (BRT)

São Vicente is a municipality in the state of Rio Grande do Norte in the Northeast region of Brazil.

== See also ==
- List of municipalities in Rio Grande do Norte
