= Patu, Rio Grande do Norte =

Municipality in Rio Grande do Norte, Brazil

Coordinates: 6°6′36″S 37°38′13″W

Patu
- Municipality
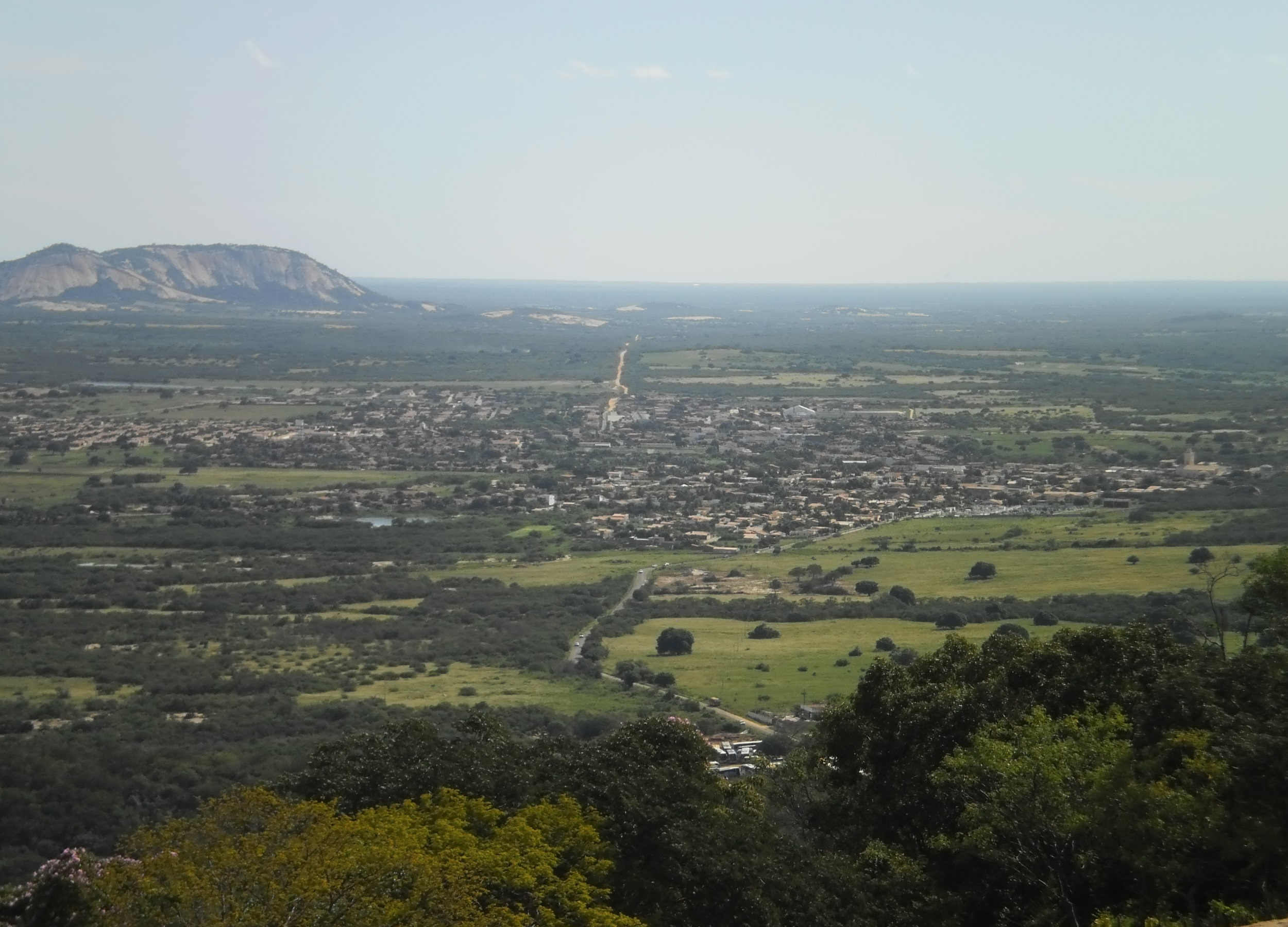

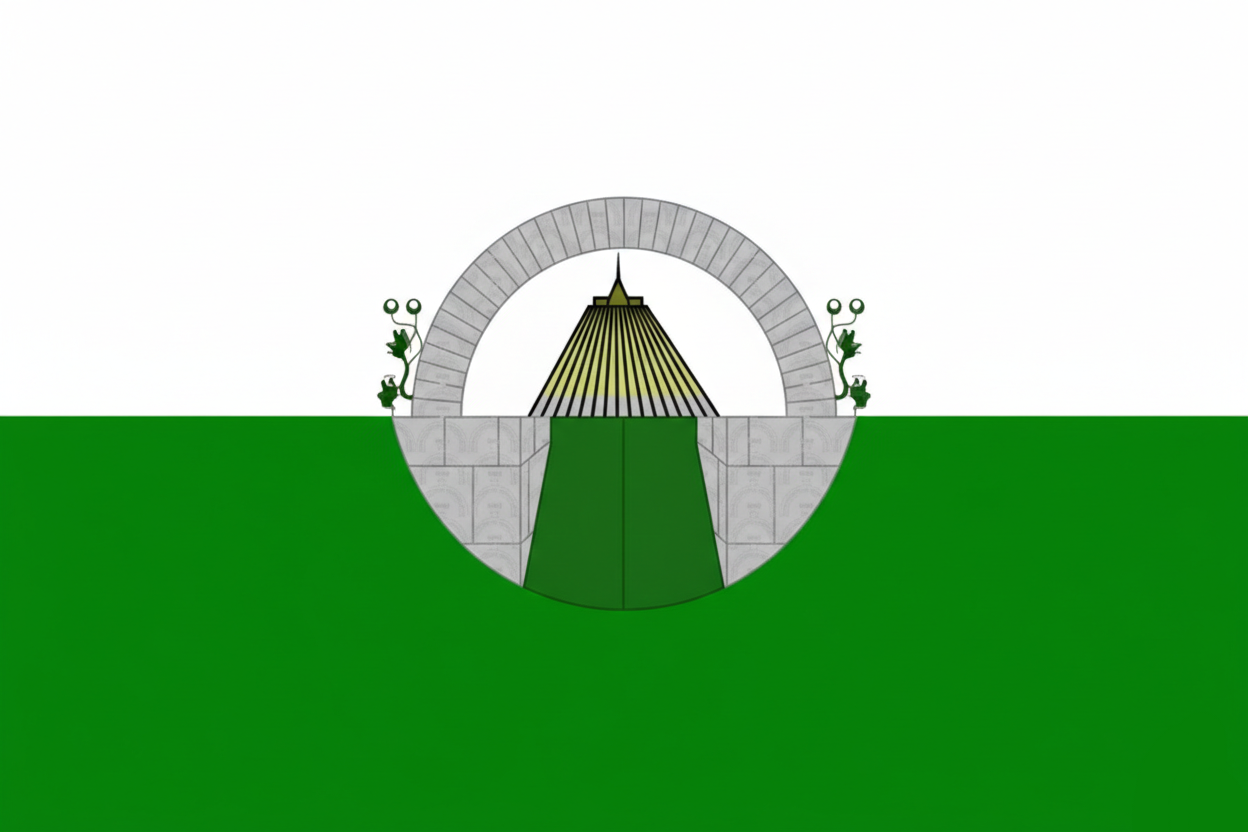
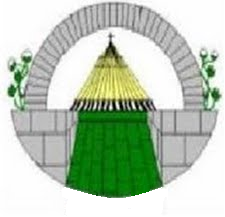
- Flag Coat of arms
- Interactive map of Patu
- Country: Brazil
- Region: Nordeste
- State: Rio Grande do Norte
- Mesoregion: Oeste Potiguar

Population (2020)
  - Total: 12,809
- Time zone: UTC−3 (BRT)

Patu is a municipality in the state of Rio Grande do Norte in the Northeast region of Brazil.

== See also ==
- List of municipalities in Rio Grande do Norte
