= Doutor Severiano =

Municipality in Rio Grande do Norte, Brazil

- Municipality
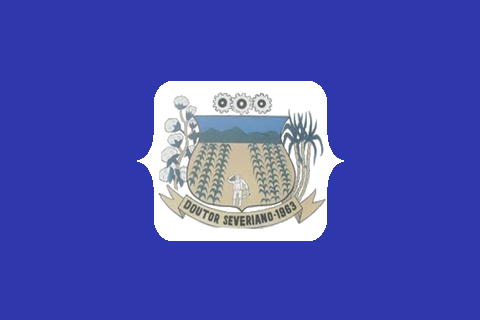
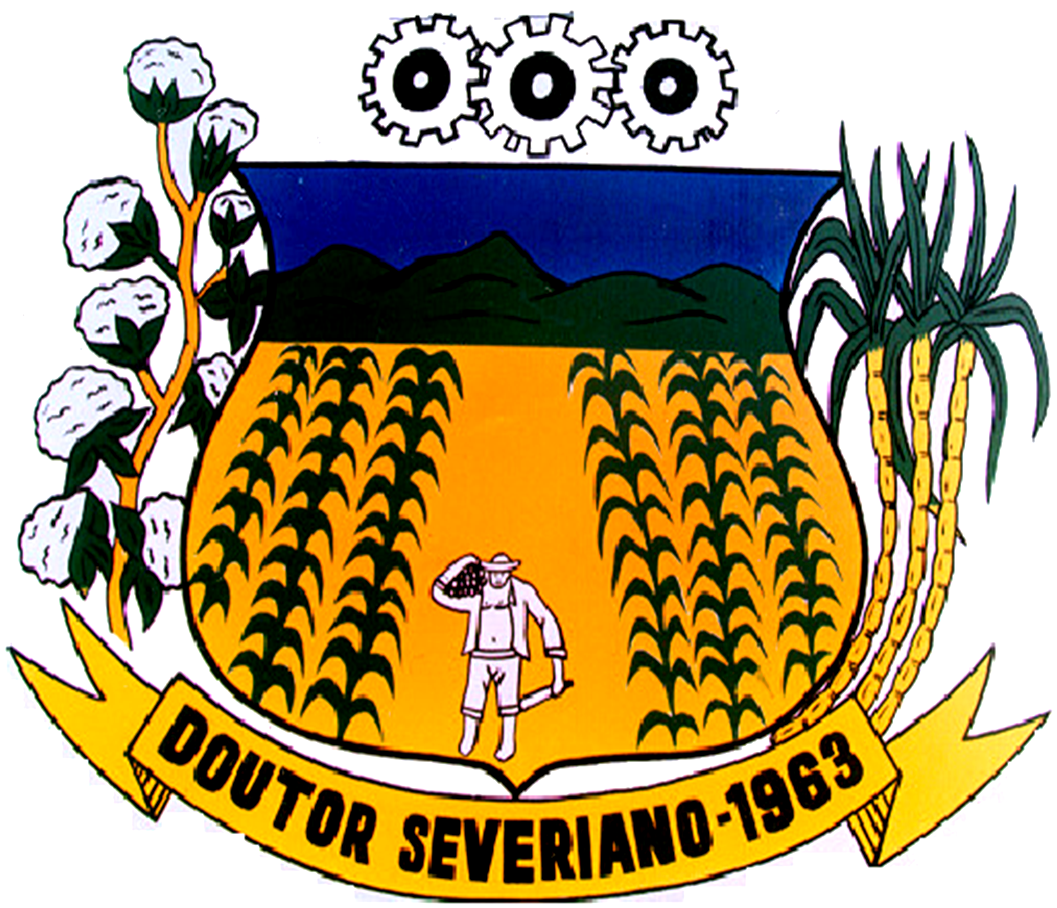
- Flag Coat of arms

- Location in Brazil
- Coordinates: 6°5′0″S 38°22′0″W
- Country: Brazil
- Region: Nordeste
- State: Rio Grande do Norte
- Mesoregion: Oeste Potiguar
- Elevation: 778 ft (237 m)

Population (2020)
  - Total: 7,072
- Time zone: UTC -3

Doutor Severiano is a municipality in the state of Rio Grande do Norte in the Northeast region of Brazil.

== See also ==
- List of municipalities in Rio Grande do Norte
