= Microregion of Macaíba =

Coordinates: 5°51′28″S 35°21′14″W

Macaíba
- Microregion
- Country: Brazil
- State: Rio Grande do Norte
- Mesoregion: Leste Potiguar

Macaíba was a microregion in the Brazilian state of Rio Grande do Norte. As of 2015, the census held in Macaiba recorded the region's population to be at 47,900.

== Municipalities ==
The microregion consisted of the following municipalities:

- Ceará-Mirim
- Macaíba
- Nísia Floresta
- São Gonçalo do Amarante
