= Microregion of Natal =

Coordinates: 5°47′42″S 35°12′32″W

Angicos
- Microregion
- Country: Brazil
- State: Rio Grande do Norte
- Mesoregion: Leste Potiguar

Natal was a microregion in the Brazilian state of Rio Grande do Norte.

== Municipalities ==
The microregion consisted of the following municipalities:

- Extremoz
- Natal
- Parnamirim
