= Leste Potiguar =

Coordinates: 5°47′42″S 35°12′32″W

- Mesoregion
- Country: Brazil
- State: Rio Grande do Norte

Leste Potiguar was a mesoregion in the Brazilian state of Rio Grande do Norte.

== Microregions ==
- Litoral Nordeste
- Litoral Sul
- Macaíba
- Natal
