= Ouro Branco, Rio Grande do Norte =

Municipality in Rio Grande do Norte, Brazil

Ouro Branco
- Municipality
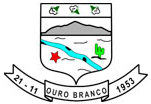
- Flag Coat of arms

- Location in Brazil
- Coordinates: 6°42′3″S 36°56′45″W
- Country: Brazil
- Region: Nordeste
- State: Rio Grande do Norte
- Mesoregion: Central Potiguar

Population (2020)
  - Total: 4,813
- Time zone: UTC−3 (BRT)

Ouro Branco is a municipality in the state of Rio Grande do Norte in the Northeast region of Brazil.

== See also ==
- List of municipalities in Rio Grande do Norte
