= Viçosa, Rio Grande do Norte =

Municipality in Rio Grande do Norte, Brazil

Viçosa
- Municipality
- The Municipality of Viçosa
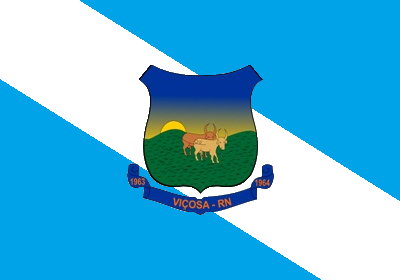
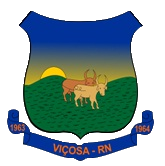
- Flag Coat of arms

- Location of Viçosa in the State of Rio Grande do Norte
- Coordinates: 05°59′38″S 37°56′38″W
- Country: Brazil
- Region: Northeast
- State: Rio Grande do Norte
- Founded: December 28, 1963

Government
  - Mayor: Maria José Oliveira (PSB)

Area
  - Total: 37.905 km^{2} (14.635 sq mi)

Population (2020)
  - Total: 1,725
  - Density: 45.51/km^{2} (117.9/sq mi)
- Time zone: UTC−3 (BRT)
- ISO 3166 code: BR-RN
- HDI (2000): 0.653 – medium
- Website: Prefeitura de Mossoró

Viçosa is a municipality in the state of Rio Grande do Norte in the Northeast region of Brazil. It is the smallest municipality in that state in terms of area.

== See also ==
- List of municipalities in Rio Grande do Norte
