= Microregion of Pau dos Ferros =

Coordinates: 6°06′39″S 38°12′32″W

Pau dos Ferros
- Microregion
- Country: Brazil
- State: Rio Grande do Norte
- Mesoregion: Oeste Potiguar

Pau dos Ferros was a microregion in the Brazilian state of Rio Grande do Norte.

== Municipalities ==
The microregion consisted of the following municipalities:

- Alexandria
- Francisco Dantas
- Itaú
- José da Penha
- Marcelino Vieira
- Paraná
- Pau dos Ferros
- Pilões
- Portalegre
- Rafael Fernandes
- Riacho da Cruz
- Rodolfo Fernandes
- São Francisco do Oeste
- Severiano Melo
- Taboleiro Grande
- Tenente Ananias
- Viçosa
