= Pau dos Ferros =

Municipality in Rio Grande do Norte, Brazil

- Municipality
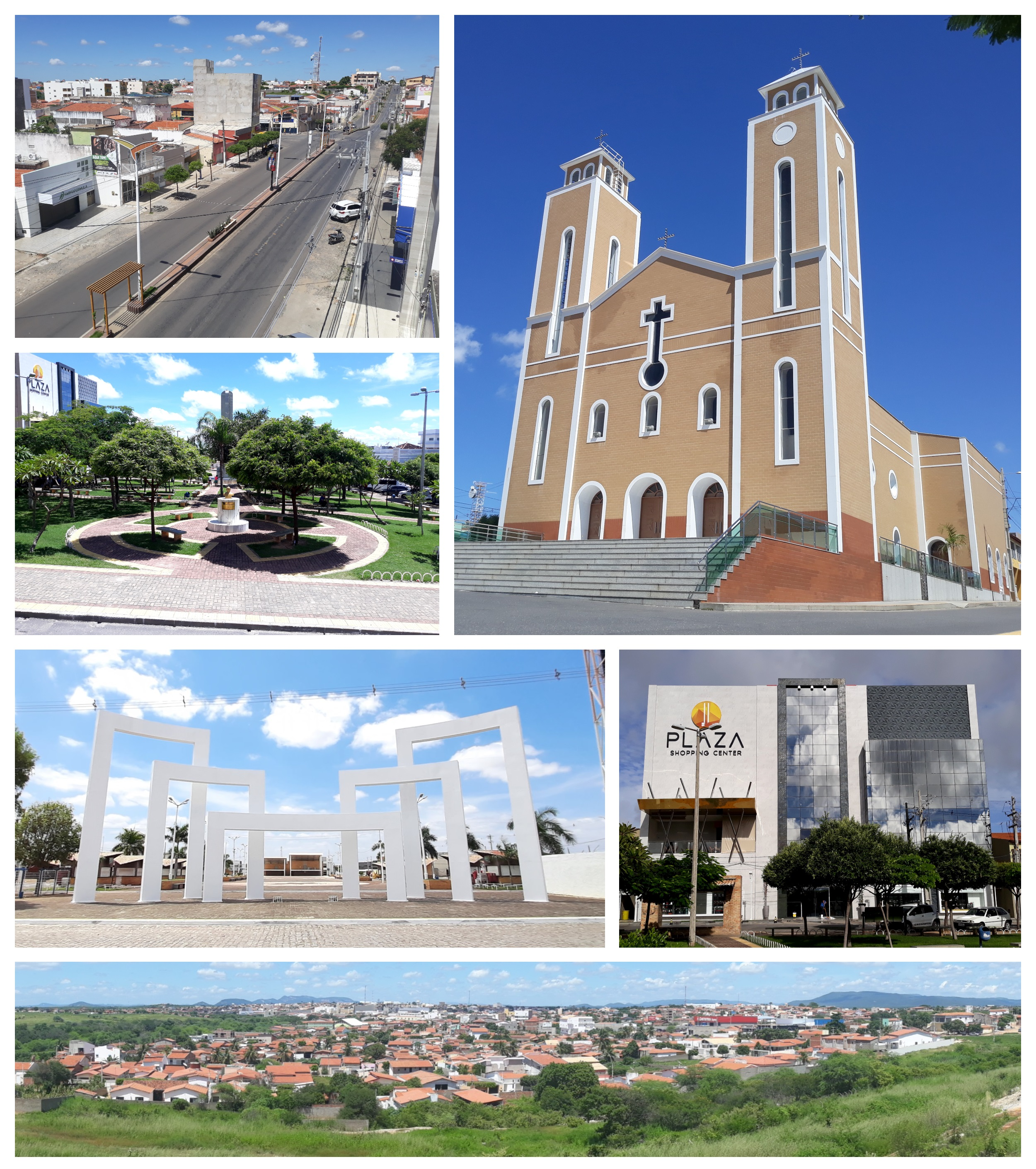
- From top, clockwise: Independence Avenue; Nossa Senhora da Conceição Church; Plaza Shopping Center; panoramic city view from Jatobá Hotel; Nossa Senhora da Conceição Events Square and Monsenhor Caminha Square, with the Obelisk in the background

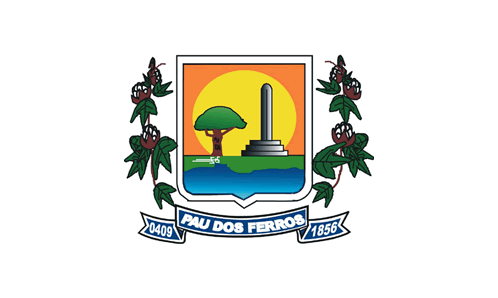
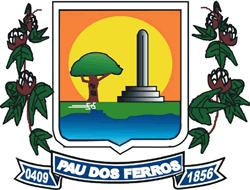
- Flag Coat of arms
- Nicknames: "Capital of Alto Oeste" "PDF" "Little Princess of the West" "Land of the Immaculate Conception" "Land of Brave Cowboys" "University City" "Entrepreneurial City"
- Anthem
- Location in the state of Rio Grande do Norte

- Location in Brazil
- Coordinates: 6°6′39″S 38°12′32″W
- Country: Brazil
- Region: Nordeste
- State: Rio Grande do Norte
- Neighboring municipalities: North: São Francisco do Oeste and Francisco Dantas; South: Rafael Fernandes and Marcelino Vieira; East: Serrinha dos Pintos, Antônio Martins, and Francisco Dantas; West: Encanto and Ereré (CE)
- Distance to capital: 389 km
- Founded: 1717
- Emancipated: September 4, 1856

Government
  - Mayor: Marianna Almeida Nascimento (PSD)
  - Term: 2021-2028
  - Councilors: 13

Area
  - Municipality: 259.959 km^{2} (100.371 sq mi)
  - Urban (IBGE/2019): 7.4616 km^{2} (2.8809 sq mi)
- Elevation: 193 m (633 ft)

Population (2022)
  - Municipality: 30,479
  - Density: 117.25/km^{2} (303.66/sq mi)
- Demonym: Pau-ferrense
- Postal code: 59900-000
- Climate: Hot semi-arid (BSh)
- HDI (UNDP/2010): 0.678
- HDI rank: RN: 10th
- Gini (2020): 0.54
- GDP (IBGE/2021): R$709,333,070
- GDP per capita (IBGE/2021): R$23,028.80
- Website: www.paudosferros.rn.gov.br

Pau dos Ferros is a Brazilian municipality in the interior of the state of Rio Grande do Norte, in the Northeast Region of Brazil. Covering an area of 260 km², it is located 389 km from Natal, the state capital. Emancipated from Portalegre in the 19th century, the name refers to a tree, likely an oiticica, which, due to its large size, provided shade and served as a resting place for cowboys who passed through the area, marking their brands with iron on the trunks of these trees, thus initiating the region's settlement.

As the main city of the Alto Oeste region, its population in the 2022 census was 30,479 inhabitants, according to the Brazilian Institute of Geography and Statistics (IBGE), making it the 18th most populous municipality in Rio Grande do Norte. However, due to the city's regional hub influence, which extends to over thirty neighboring municipalities, approximately 50,000 people pass through the municipal seat daily.

The municipality boasts several historical and cultural attractions, including the Dr. Pedro Diógenes Fernandes Public Reservoir, which supplies the city's water, and the Nossa Senhora da Conceição Church, built in 1738 and established as a parish church in 1756. Additionally, the Obelisk at Praça Monsenhor Caminha was erected to commemorate the centenary of political emancipation and the bicentenary of the parish. Cultural highlights include the Intermunicipal Fair of Education, Culture, Tourism, and Business of Alto Oeste Potiguar (FINECAP), a significant cultural and economic exposition, and the festivities honoring the patron saint Our Lady of the Immaculate Conception, held from late November to early December.

== History ==
=== From origins to emancipation ===
For a long time, the area of present-day Pau dos Ferros was inhabited by the Panati indigenous people. Between the late 17th and early 18th centuries, cowboys and travelers crossing the sertão discovered a watercourse, later named the Apodi River, surrounded by large, leafy trees that soon became resting spots during long, exhausting journeys. Along this river, trading posts were established, where cattle were sold and branded on the trunks of these trees.

Colonel Antônio da Rocha Pita

In 1717, during the colonial period, Manoel Negrão became the first grantee of a sesmaria, which was later donated to Colonel Antônio da Rocha Pita, who owned vast lands in the provinces of Ceará and Rio Grande do Norte. Upon his death in 1733, this sesmaria, named "Pau dos Ferros," was inherited by his children Francisco da Rocha Pita, Luiz da Rocha Pita Deusdará, Simão da Fonseca, and Maria Joana, all of whom were pioneers in establishing a small settlement with many mud houses around the sesmaria. The most significant pioneer was the farmer Francisco Marçal, who founded a cattle ranch and, through great efforts, was responsible for building a chapel in 1738, which became the parish church of a large freguesia on December 19, 1756, with the creation of the Our Lady of the Immaculate Conception Parish, with Our Lady of the Immaculate Conception as its patron saint.

In 1761, the settlement was incorporated into the village of Portalegre, which, being located in the mountains 33 kilometers from Pau dos Ferros, hindered local commerce and access for residents. In the western zone of Rio Grande do Norte, only three settlements existed at the time: Apodi, Portalegre, and Pau dos Ferros, with the latter experiencing steady growth due to its strategic location between two large mountain ranges. Meanwhile, two other mountain settlements, Luís Gomes and São Miguel, began to gain prominence.

In the 19th century, starting in 1841, residents of the settlement gathered 492 signatures in a petition to elevate Pau dos Ferros to the status of a village. The proposal was submitted to the provincial assembly and approved by the Statistics and Justice Committee but failed to pass in the plenary session. A second attempt in 1847, also unsuccessful, was made when deputy João Inácio de Loiola Barros proposed transferring the village seat from Portalegre to Pau dos Ferros on October 21. On April 12, 1853, provincial deputies Luiz Antônio de Brito Guerra (Baron of Assu) and Elias Antônio Cavalcanti de Albuquerque introduced a new proposal to create a village named Vila Cristina, which was also rejected.

Finally, on August 23, 1856, deputy Bevenuto Vicente Fialho presented a new proposal to the provincial assembly in Natal. This project was approved and became provincial law no. 344, sanctioned on September 4 by Governor Antônio Bernardo Passos, elevating the settlement to village status, separating it from Portalegre nearly a century after the parish’s creation. The name "Pau dos Ferros" derives from a tree, likely an oiticica, marked with iron brands by cowboys who rested under its expansive shade after long journeys.

=== From emancipation to centenary ===
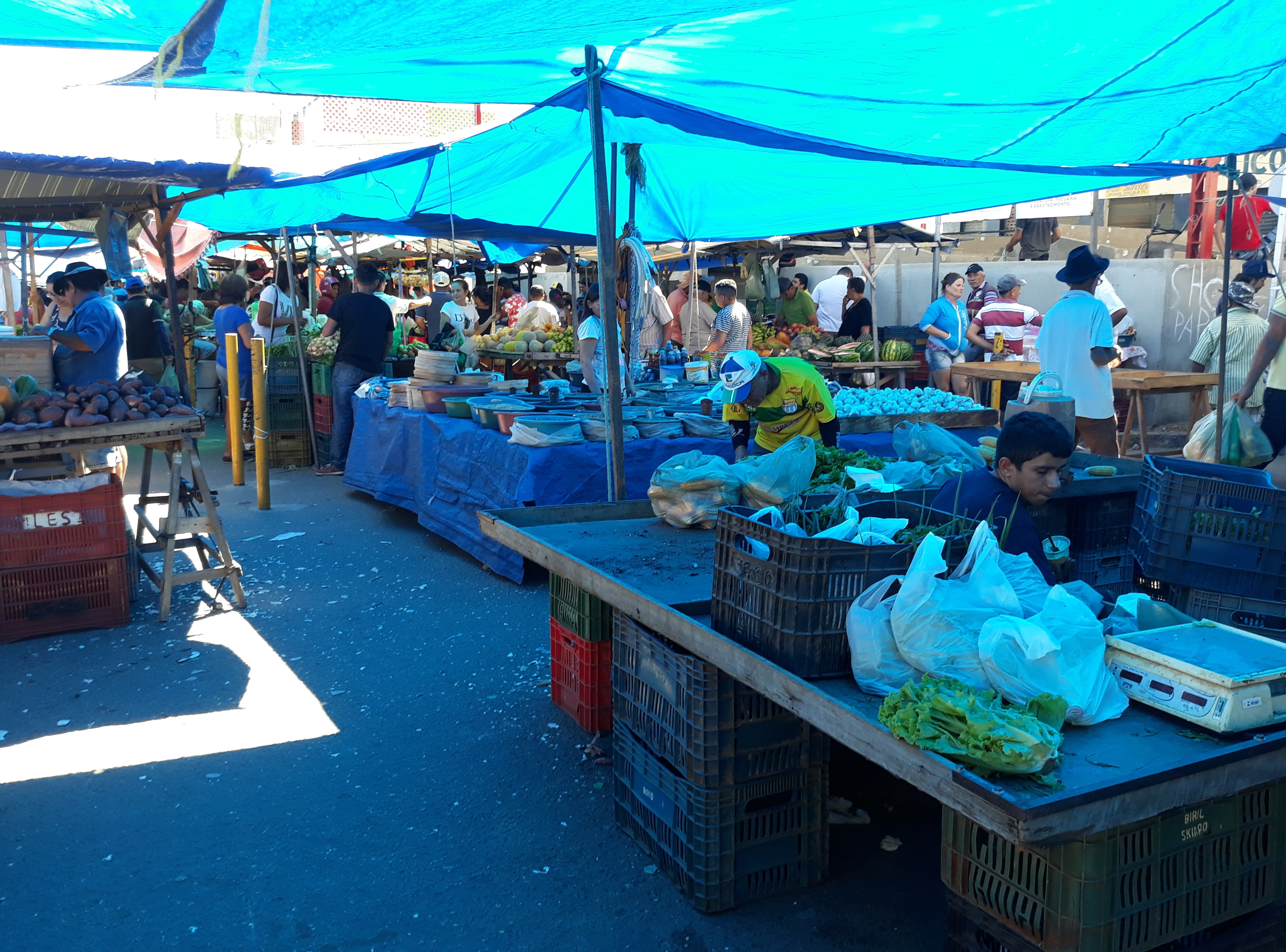
Pau dos Ferros free market, held weekly on Saturdays since the 19th century

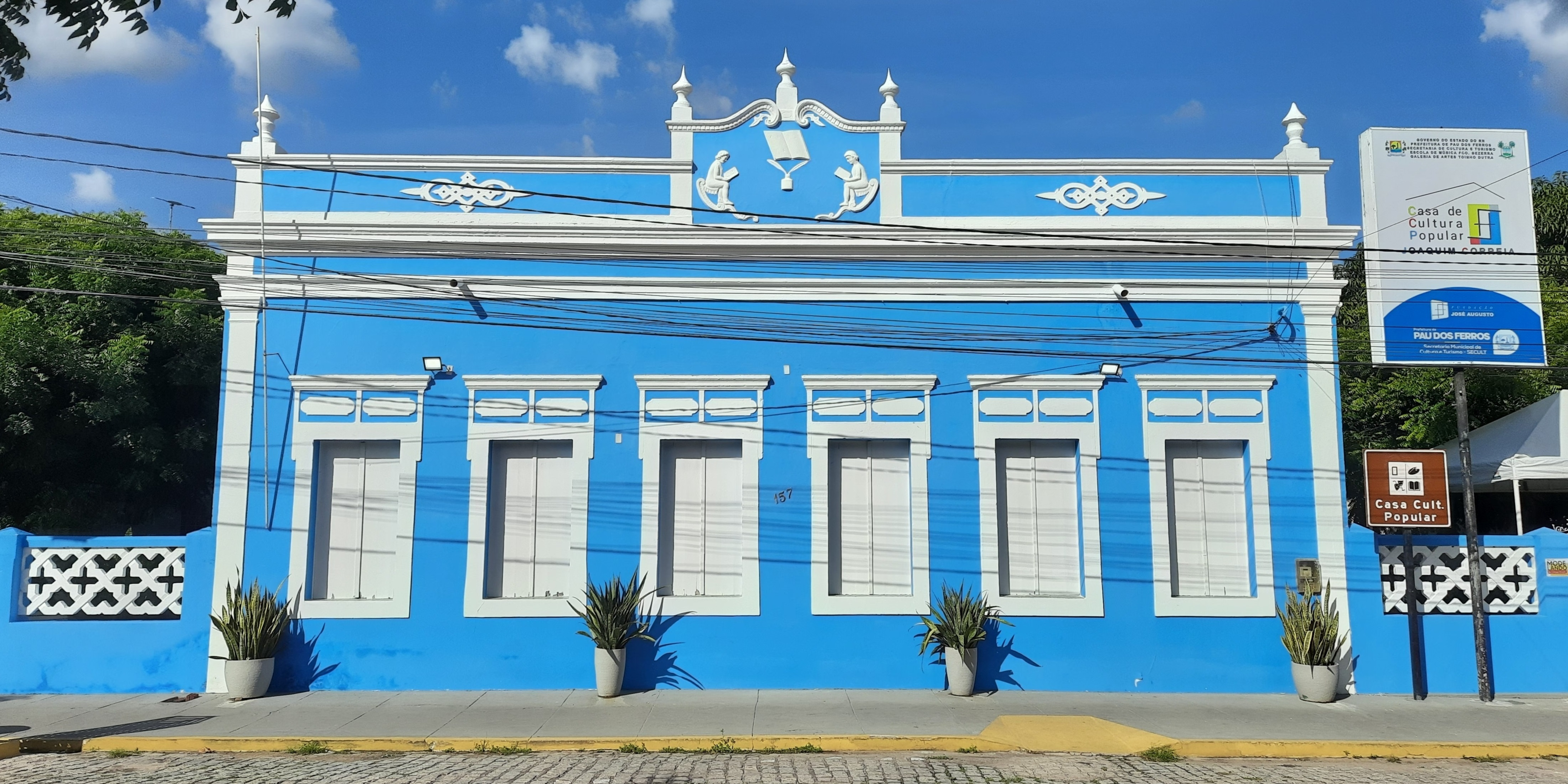
Joaquim Correia Popular Culture House, the first school in Pau dos Ferros, now housing the Municipal Secretariat of Culture and Tourism (SECULT)

On January 19, 1857, the municipality was officially established in a solemn session at the municipal council, with Manoel Silvestre Ferreira as its first president. On December 1, 1859, the city’s free market was created, which was briefly interrupted but restored in 1868 and has since been held weekly on Saturdays. In 1872, during the first national census, Pau dos Ferros was the third most populous municipality in the province, with 18,637 inhabitants, surpassed only by Nova Cruz (20,466) and Natal (19,126). On August 8, 1873, provincial law no. 683 established the Pau dos Ferros District, separated from the Imperatriz district, now Martins.

Following a major cholera epidemic in 1862, which killed 199 people according to official records, Pau dos Ferros was struck by a severe drought in 1877, lasting three years—the worst in Brazil’s history—followed by outbreaks of measles, smallpox, and dysentery, which further decimated the population due to the lack of hospitals and healthcare facilities. Earlier, in 1876, Pau dos Ferros lost territory with the emancipation of São Miguel, which became a municipality. In 1890, Luís Gomes followed suit.

From 1889, the year of the Proclamation of the Republic, construction began on a reservoir, inaugurated on March 25, 1897, and named "25 de Março." Proposed in 1888 by municipal intendant Joaquim José Correia, it supplied water to the local population for decades. Later, the Gangorra Reservoir, now in Rafael Fernandes, was also built. In the early 20th century, in 1908, Joaquim Correia initiated the construction of a school, named after him and inaugurated in 1911, with Orlando Correia as its first director and Idalina Gurjão and Maria Luíza as its first teachers, who served for many years.

In the late 1910s, one of the bloodiest events in Pau dos Ferros’ history occurred, the "1919 massacre," stemming from a local musical group, the Dr. Guilherme Lins Philharmonic Band, composed of opposing political factions. On April 3, 1919, during a meeting at José Ayres Afonso’s residence, disputes escalated into a violent clash. The situation worsened with the arrival of the police, leading to a shootout with rifles, resulting in deaths and injuries among participants. Consequently, Colonel Joaquim Correia left Pau dos Ferros and settled in Natal. On December 2, 1924, the village of Pau dos Ferros was elevated to city status by state law no. 593, signed by Governor José Augusto Bezerra de Medeiros.

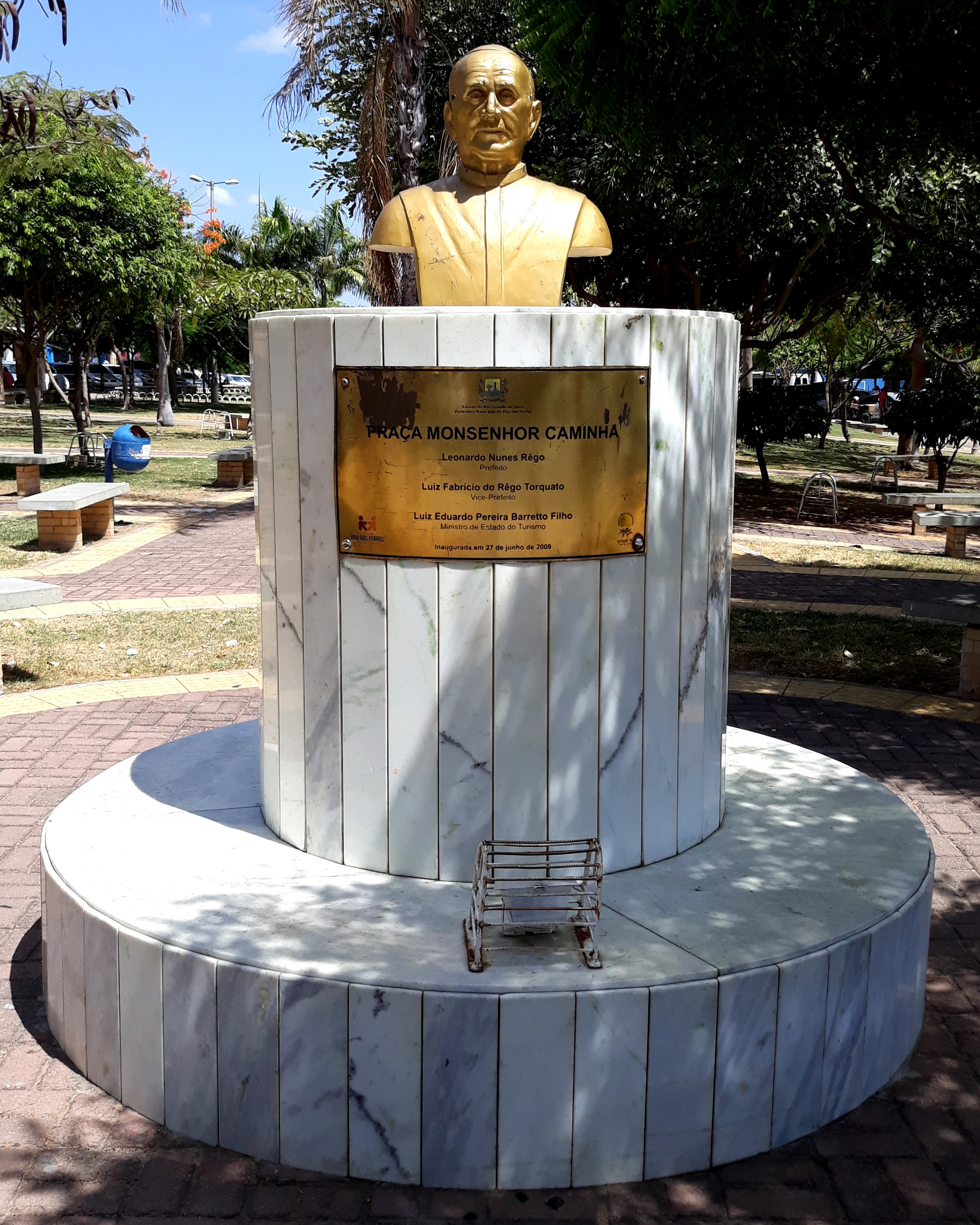
Bust of Manoel Caminha Freire de Andrade (1908–2003), vicar of the Pau dos Ferros parish from 1940 to 1991, at Monsenhor Caminha Square

In 1926, the bandit Virgulino Ferreira da Silva, known as Lampião, and his gang entered Pau dos Ferros, committing various thefts, as the city had only one civil policeman at the time. In 1929, Picuí native Francisco Dantas de Araújo became the first mayor of Pau dos Ferros, overseeing the construction of the current municipal headquarters in 1930, located on Getúlio Vargas Avenue. That same year, following the October 24 Revolutionary Movement, he was deposed, and João Escolástico Bezerra de Medeiros took over, introducing electricity to Pau dos Ferros through a coal-powered plant. Another significant event in the 1930s was the election of Pau dos Ferros native Rafael Fernandes Gurjão to the state governorship by the Legislative Assembly of Rio Grande do Norte, serving from 1935 to 1943.

In 1939, Francisco Fernandes Sena became mayor, overseeing the construction of a public slaughterhouse and the first police station in 1940. On February 11, 1940, Father Manoel Caminha Freire de Andrade was appointed parish vicar, becoming a canon in 1954 and a monsignor in 1966, serving until 1991 when he retired due to health issues. From January 31 to March 15, 1946, Eulália Fernandes Bessa became the first woman to serve as mayor, appointed by federal intervener Miguel Seabra Fagundes.

In the early 1950s, during Dr. Licurgo Nunes Ferreira’s administration (1948–1953), construction began on the municipal pavilion at Praça da Matriz, later named "Cônego Caminha," becoming a key leisure area. Its upper floor housed a dance hall where the band Os Brasas performed. His administration also saw the construction and inauguration of the 31 de Março School, now the Dr. José Fernandes de Melo State School. In 1953, construction began on the Patronato, inaugurated on July 19, 1954, by the Daughters of Charity. That same year, the parish vicar brought a statue of Our Lady of Fátima from Portugal, marking one of the municipality’s most significant religious events, and through community efforts, built a chapel in her honor on 13 de Maio Street, inaugurated in 1956. In 1955, the Banco do Nordeste agency arrived in the municipality.

=== From the centenary to the present day ===
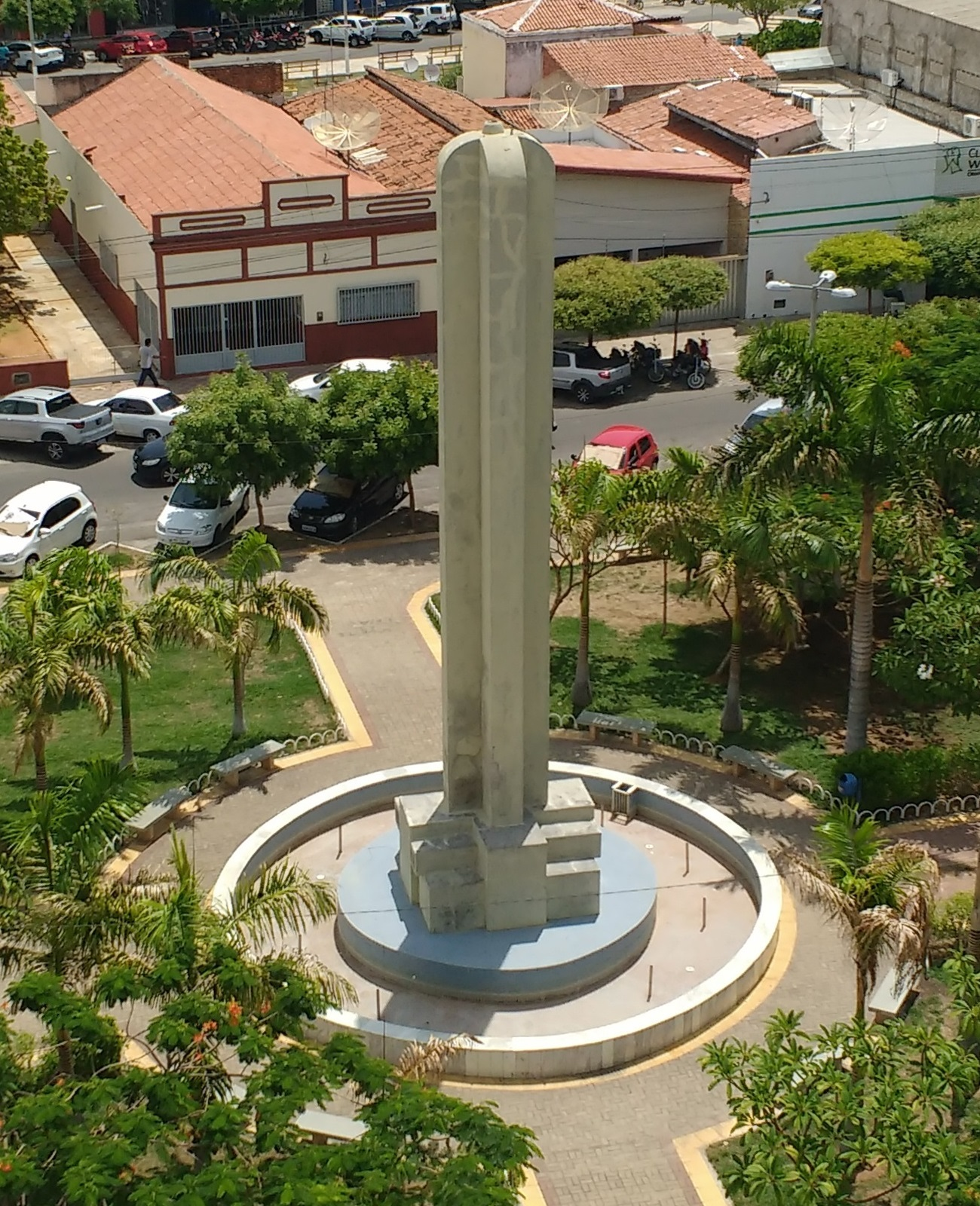
Obelisk of Pau dos Ferros, inaugurated in 1956, commemorating the municipality’s centenary and the parish’s bicentenary

On September 4, 1956, Pau dos Ferros celebrated its centennial of political emancipation. That year, several events marked the city’s centenary and the parish’s bicentenary, including the inauguration of the Obelisk at Monsenhor Caminha Square on December 14. Designed by Bahian architect Oscar de Sousa Lelis at the request of then-mayor José Fernandes de Melo, the monument was a highlight of the celebrations. In July 1956, the Pau dos Ferros Centenary Hospital was founded, with Nelson Maia as its founder and director.

In 1958, Mayor Paulo Diógenes built the current "4 de Setembro State School" and over 40 kilometers of roads and streets, including the Independence Avenue. On January 1, 1961, Dom Eliseu Simões Mendes founded the Santa Luzia de Marilac Maternity, maintained by the parish’s social assistance league. From 1963 to 1969, during Pedro Diógenes Fernandes’ administration, notable achievements included the creation of the municipal flag, the installation of the first telephones, and the construction of the Pau dos Ferros Dam, which began in 1965 and was completed in 1967. In 1966, the city’s main entertainment venue, Cine São João, opened on Rua 7 de Setembro, at a time when television was not yet available in the city.

During José Edmilson de Holanda’s first term (1970–1973), Pau dos Ferros received electricity from the Rio Grande do Norte Energy Company (COSERN). In 1970, a severe drought prompted aid from the National Department of Works Against Droughts (DNOCS), which built the city’s water treatment plant, featuring a 19-meter-high water tank with a 500 cubic meter capacity. On February 28, 1971, the TELERN (Rio Grande do Norte Telecommunications) facilities were inaugurated. Other notable achievements included the opening of the 9 de Janeiro Stadium, commemorating Clube Centenário Pauferrense’s victory in the first Matutão championship on January 9, 1972, and the Jaime de Aquino Municipal Forum, which has since housed the Pau dos Ferros district court. After José Edmilson’s departure, José Fernandes de Melo returned as mayor until 1977. On September 28, 1976, state decree-law no. 15 established the State University of Rio Grande do Norte (UERN) campus in the municipality, named "Professora Maria Elisa de Albuquerque Maia."

In the 1980s and 1990s, key developments included the inauguration of the municipal bus terminal in 1984; the launch of the first radio station, AM Cultura do Oeste, on April 1, 1986; the first visit by a President of Brazil, José Sarney, on October 28, 1987; the paving of BR-405 along Independence Avenue; and the creation of the Municipal Culture Fair (FECUM) in 1994, which evolved into the Intermunicipal Fair of Education, Culture, Tourism, and Business of Alto Oeste Potiguar (FINECAP) in 1997.

In the 2000s and 2010s, significant events included the construction of the Nossa Senhora da Conceição Events Square and the reconstruction of the old Matriz Square, which became Monsenhor Caminha Square, inaugurated during a mass on June 27, 2009. Additionally, two federal higher education institutions were established: the Federal Institute of Rio Grande do Norte (IFRN) and the Federal Rural University of the Semi-arid Region (UFERSA) in 2009 and 2012, respectively. The region’s first major shopping mall, Plaza Shopping Center, was inaugurated in January 2019.

In the 2020 municipal elections, Marianna Almeida Nascimento won with 54.22% of the valid votes, becoming the first woman elected by direct vote and the second woman to hold the office since 1946. On June 24, 2021, Pau dos Ferros was visited by Jair Bolsonaro, the second Brazilian president to visit the city. Marianna was re-elected in 2024 with the highest vote count in the municipality’s history, securing over 11,000 votes (63% of valid votes).

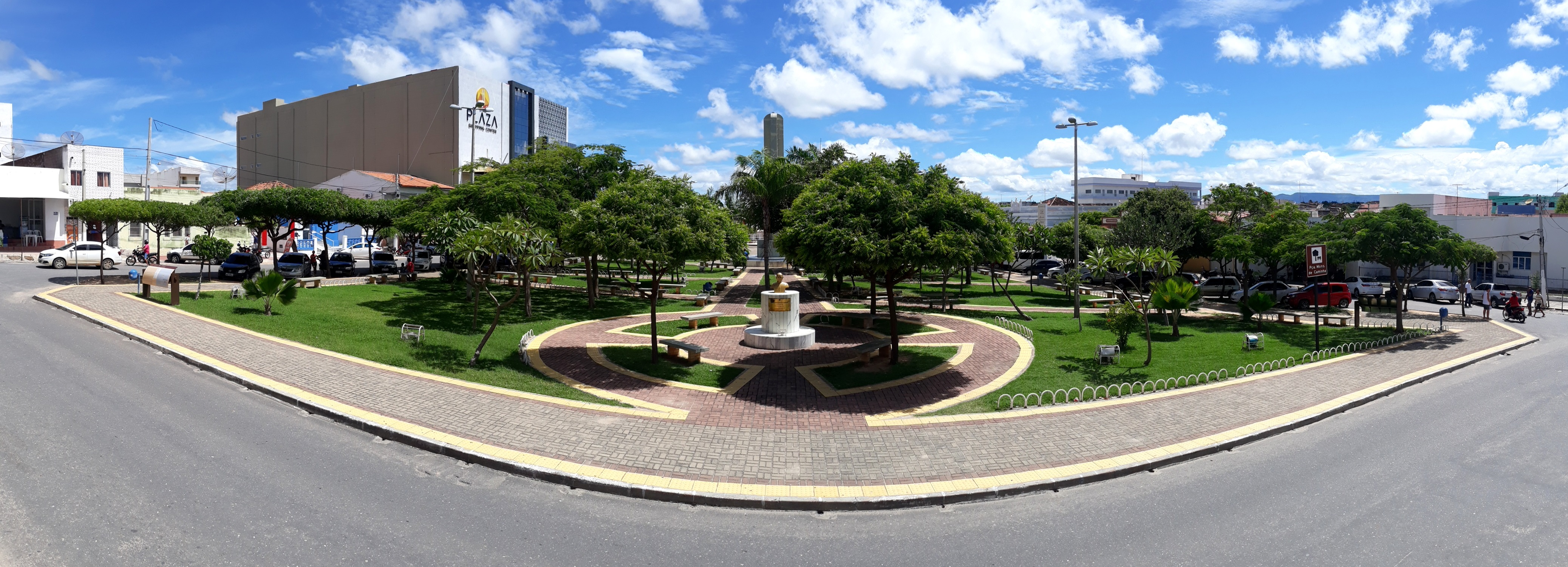
Monsenhor Caminha Square (Matriz Square), in the city center, with Plaza Shopping Center on the left

== Geography ==
The territory of Pau dos Ferros spans 259.959 km² (0.4923% of the state’s surface), with 7.4616 km² of urban area, comprising 29 neighborhoods. Its municipal boundaries are: to the north, São Francisco do Oeste and Francisco Dantas; to the south, Rafael Fernandes and Marcelino Vieira; to the east, Serrinha dos Pintos, Antônio Martins, and again Francisco Dantas; and to the west, Encanto and Ereré, the latter in the state of Ceará. The city is 389 km from the state capital, Natal, and 2,115 km from Brasília, the federal capital. Under the territorial division in effect since 2017, established by the IBGE, the municipality belongs to the immediate geographic region of Pau dos Ferros, within the intermediate region of Mossoró. Previously, under the division into microregions and mesoregions, it was part of the Pau dos Ferros microregion in the Oeste Potiguar mesoregion.

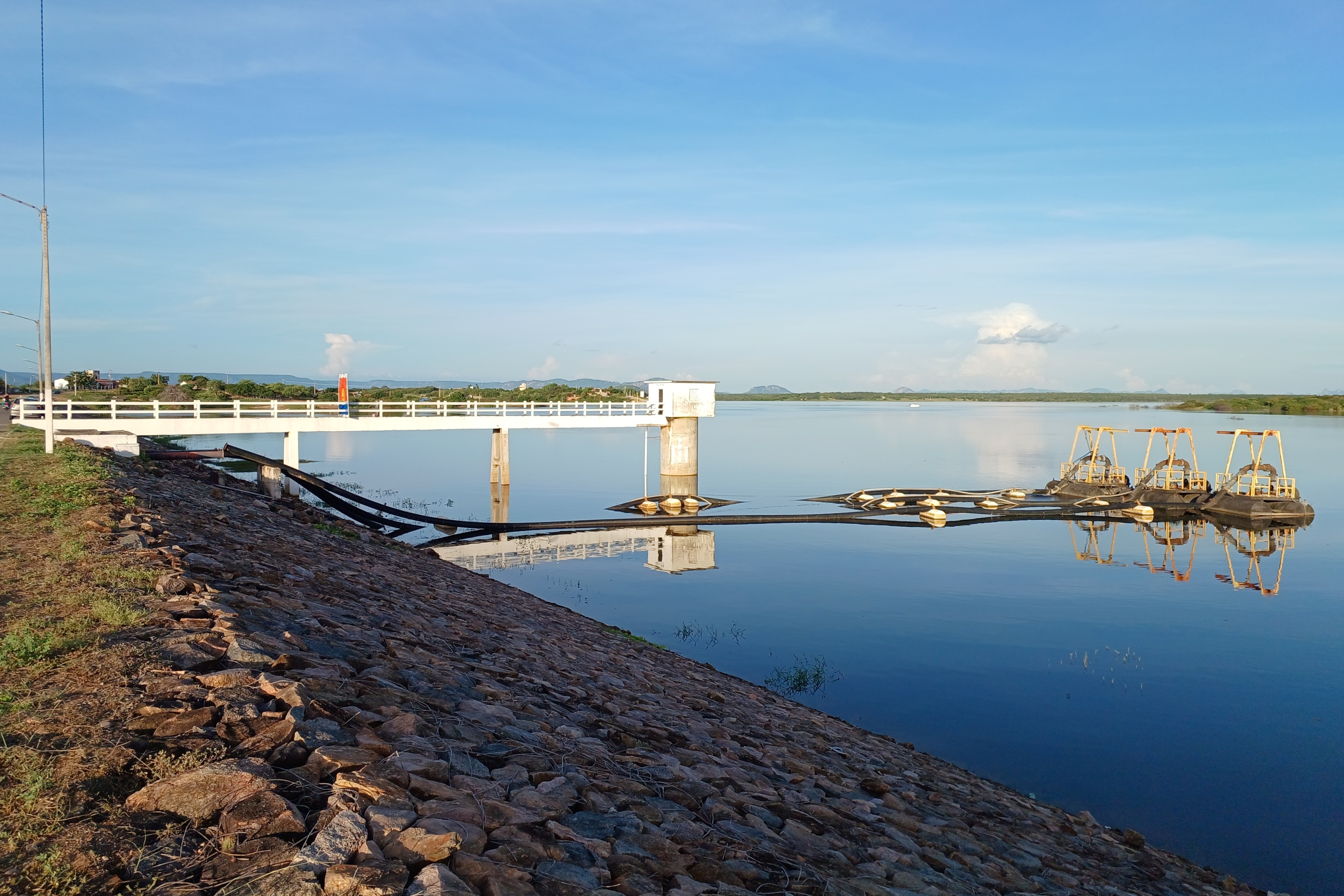
Pier of the Pau dos Ferros Dam, the reservoir supplying the city

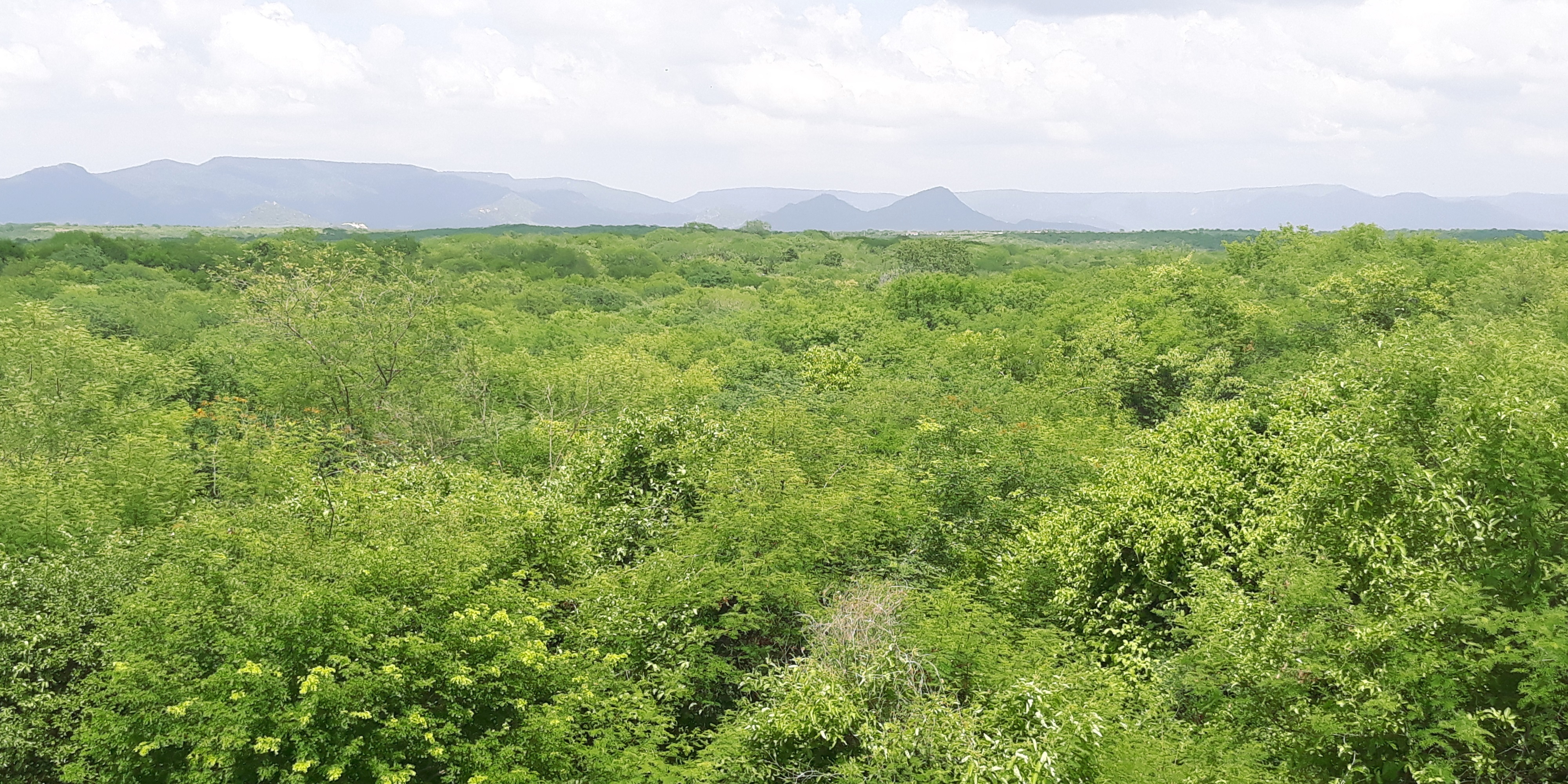
The caatinga, the municipality’s typical vegetation, during the rainy season

The local terrain lies within the Sertaneja Depression, a transitional area between the Apodi Plateau and the Borborema Plateau. The geology features metamorphic rocks forming the crystalline basement, dating from the middle Precambrian, between one and 2.5 billion years old. The most common soil type is red-yellow eutrophic podzol, with significant drainage, gentle slopes, high fertility, and medium texture, which may or may not include gravel. Smaller areas have non-calcareous brunisol and lithosol. In the new Brazilian soil classification, the latter is now called neosol, while the others are classified as luvisol.

These less-developed soils are covered by hyperxerophilous caatinga, a low-growing vegetation typical of the sertão, leafless during the dry season. Common species include Caesalpinia pyramidalis, Pilosocereus pachycladus, faveleiro (Cnidoscolus quercifolius), Ziziphus joazeiro, jurema preta (Mimosa hostilis), quince (Cydonia oblonga), mofumbo (Combretum leprosum), oiticica (Licania rigida), pink ipê (Handroanthus impetiginosus), Aspidosperma pyrifolium, and dildo cactus (Pilosocereus polygonus). Much of the original vegetation has been cleared for agriculture, particularly cotton cultivation.

Pau dos Ferros is traversed by the Apodi-Mossoró River, with its entire territory within the homonymous hydrographic basin. Other watercourses include the Cajazeiras, Capa, Estrema, Meio, and Retiro streams. The main reservoir is the Dr. Pedro Diógenes Fernandes Public Reservoir (Açude Pau dos Ferros), built by the National Department of Works Against Droughts (DNOCS) and inaugurated in 1967, located three kilometers from the urban area with a capacity of 54,846,000 m³. Other reservoirs with capacities of 100,000 m³ or more include the 25 de Março (8,181,000 m³), Capa (640,800 m³), and Benevides José Gonçalves (129,760 m³).

The climate is hot semi-arid (BSh according to the Köppen climate classification), with high temperatures year-round and precipitation in the form of rain, concentrated in the first half of the year, with little to no rain in the latter half. According to data from the Rio Grande do Norte Agricultural Research Company (EMPARN) for 1911–1985 and from 1993 onward, the highest 24-hour rainfall recorded in Pau dos Ferros was 147.8 mm on April 15, 1982. The record monthly rainfall was 548.9 mm in March 1981, and the wettest year was 1974, with 1,505.2 mm. Since August 2019, the lowest temperature recorded in Pau dos Ferros was on July 22, 2020, with a minimum of 17.7 °C, while the highest reached 41.1 °C on October 31, 2023.

Climate data for Pau dos Ferros
Month	Jan	Feb	Mar	Apr	May	Jun	Jul	Aug	Sep	Oct	Nov	Dec	Year
Record high °C (°F)	39.3 (102.7)	39.2 (102.6)	37.4 (99.3)	35.7 (96.3)	35.8 (96.4)	35.8 (96.4)	37.2 (99.0)	38.1 (100.6)	39.2 (102.6)	41.1 (106.0)	39.9 (103.8)	39.9 (103.8)	41.1 (106.0)
Record low °C (°F)	20.2 (68.4)	20.5 (68.9)	20.1 (68.2)	20.6 (69.1)	20.2 (68.4)	18.8 (65.8)	17.7 (63.9)	18.3 (64.9)	20.2 (68.4)	21.2 (70.2)	21.5 (70.7)	20.8 (69.4)	17.7 (63.9)
Average precipitation mm (inches)	72 (2.8)	124.8 (4.91)	187.6 (7.39)	161 (6.3)	100.4 (3.95)	32.5 (1.28)	20.6 (0.81)	6.3 (0.25)	2.9 (0.11)	5.7 (0.22)	6.1 (0.24)	25.1 (0.99)	744.9 (29.33)
Source 1: LAVAT (UERN)/UFERSA (temperature records: Aug 6, 2019–present)
Source 2: EMPARN (precipitation averages from 1911 to 2020)

== Demographics ==
Population growth

Year	Pop.	±%
1872	18,637	—
1900	5,827	−68.7%
1920	10,124	+73.7%
1940	14,183	+40.1%
1950	17,517	+23.5%
1960	16,678	−4.8%

Year	Pop.	±%
1970	12,138	−27.2%
1980	16,216	+33.6%
1991	20,827	+28.4%
2000	24,758	+18.9%
2010	27,745	+12.1%
2022	30,479	+9.9%

Between the 2010 and 2022 censuses, Pau dos Ferros’ population grew by 9.85%, at an annual rate of 0.79%. With 27,745 inhabitants in 2010, the population rose to 30,479 in 2022, ranking 18th in the state, 354th in the region, and 1,122nd nationally. The population density was 117.25 inhabitants/km², with an average of 2.8 residents per household. With 51.81% female and 48.19% male, the sex ratio was 93.03. Additionally, 91.9% of inhabitants lived in the urban area, and 8.1% in the rural area.

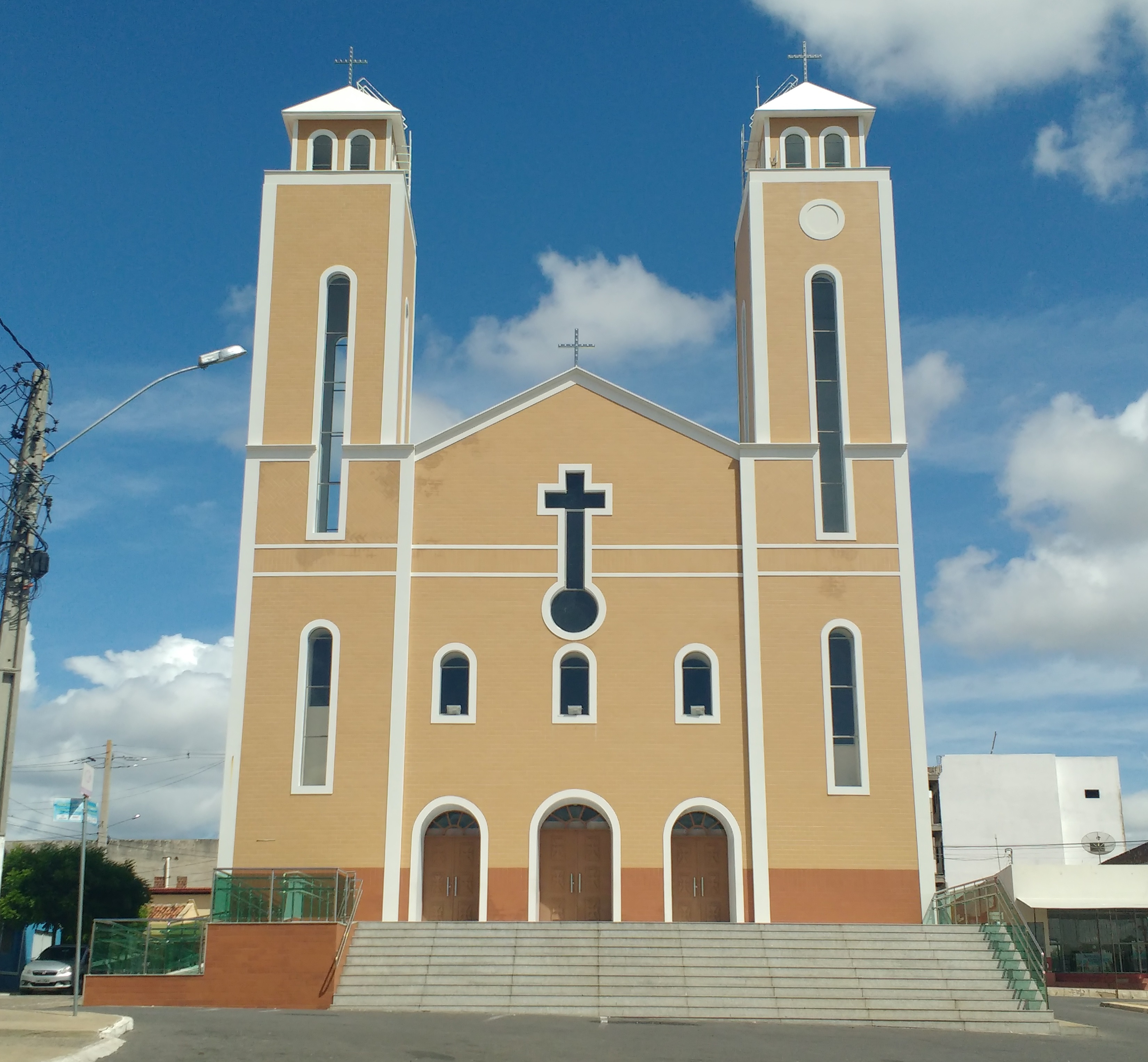
Nossa Senhora da Conceição Church, seat of the Pau dos Ferros parish

In terms of race, 51.96% of the population was white, 38.72% was mixed race, and 9.26% was black. There were small Asian and indigenous populations, at 0.03% each. According to the same census, 76.15% of residents aged ten or older identified as Catholics, 14.89% Evangelicals, 0.91% Spiritists, and 0.25% Umbanda and Candomblé followers; 5.13% had no religion, 2.51% followed other denominations, 0.14% did not declare, and 0.03% were unsure of their religious preference.

Population pyramid (2022)
%	Males	Age	Females	%
0.02		100+		0.03
0.05		95–99		0.05
0.11		90–94		0.22
0.31		85–89		0.46
0.56		80–84		0.76
0.77		75–79		1.04
1.15		70–74		1.56
1.37		65–69		1.92
1.91		60–64		2.35
2.58		55–59		3.12
2.90		50–54		3.38
3.12		45–49		3.47
3.70		40–44		3.99
4.23		35–39		4.44
4.07		30–34		3.98
4.21		25–29		4.12
4.22		20–24		4.18
3.66		15–19		3.40
3.19		10–14		3.33
3.03		5–9		3.01
3.04		0–4		2.98

The Human Development Index (HDI-M) of the municipality is considered medium, according to the United Nations Development Programme (UNDP). In 2010, reported in 2013, its value was 0.678, ranking 10th in Rio Grande do Norte and 2,481st in Brazil. The longevity index was 0.803, the income index 0.666, and the education index 0.584.

From 2000 to 2010, the Gini index decreased from 0.57 to 0.54, and the proportion of people with a per capita household income of up to R$140 dropped from 38.6% to 20.6%, a 46.6% reduction. In 2010, 79.4% of the population lived above the poverty line, 13.2% between the indigence and poverty lines, and 7.4% below the indigence line. The richest 20% accounted for 58.9% of the municipality’s total income, nearly 17 times that of the poorest 20%, at 3.5%.

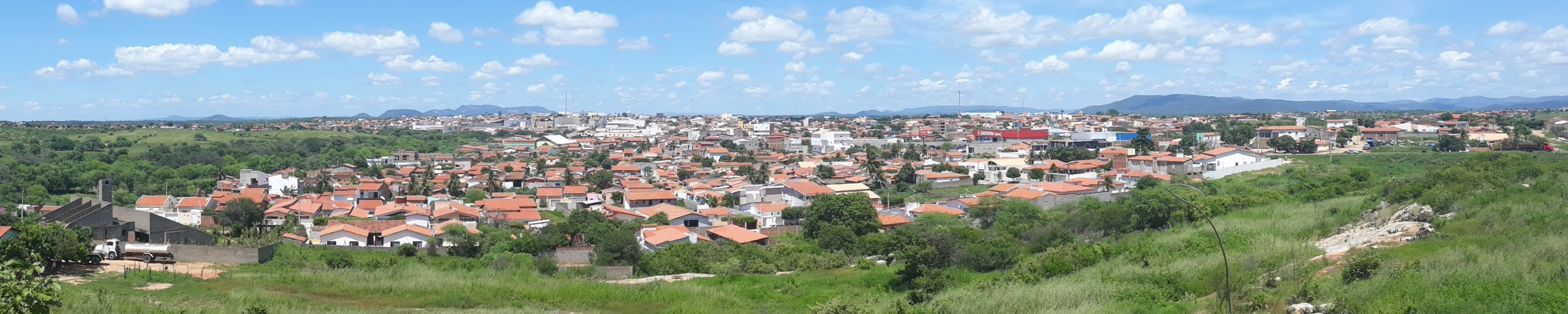
Partial panoramic view of the city from Jatobá Hotel

== Politics ==
According to the organic law of Pau dos Ferros, enacted on April 2, 1990, the municipality’s powers are the executive and legislative, with representatives elected by direct vote for four-year terms. The executive is led by the mayor, supported by a freely appointed cabinet of secretaries. The legislative is exercised by the municipal chamber, which oversees the executive and drafts and votes on essential laws, including the annual budget law and the multi-year plan. Since 2025, the municipality has 13 councilors.

Several municipal councils are active, including civil defense, children’s and adolescents’ rights, elderly rights, education, environment, and guardianship. Pau dos Ferros is home to a state judiciary district, covering Água Nova, Encanto, Francisco Dantas, Rafael Fernandes, Riacho de Santana, and São Francisco do Oeste. According to the Superior Electoral Court (TSE), Pau dos Ferros belongs to the 40th electoral zone of Rio Grande do Norte, with 21,054 voters in December 2024, representing 0.7956% of the state’s electorate.

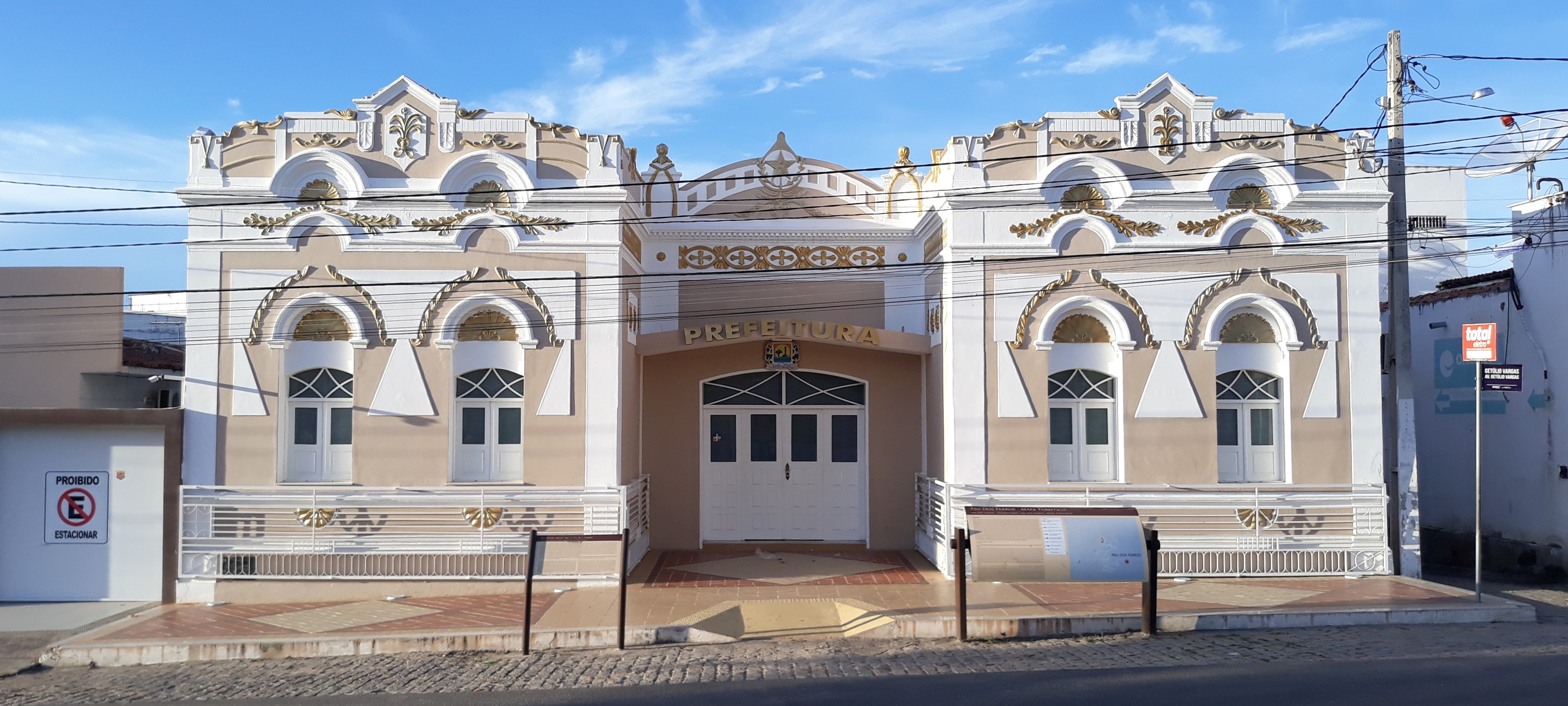
José Fernandes de Melo Municipal Palace (City Hall)

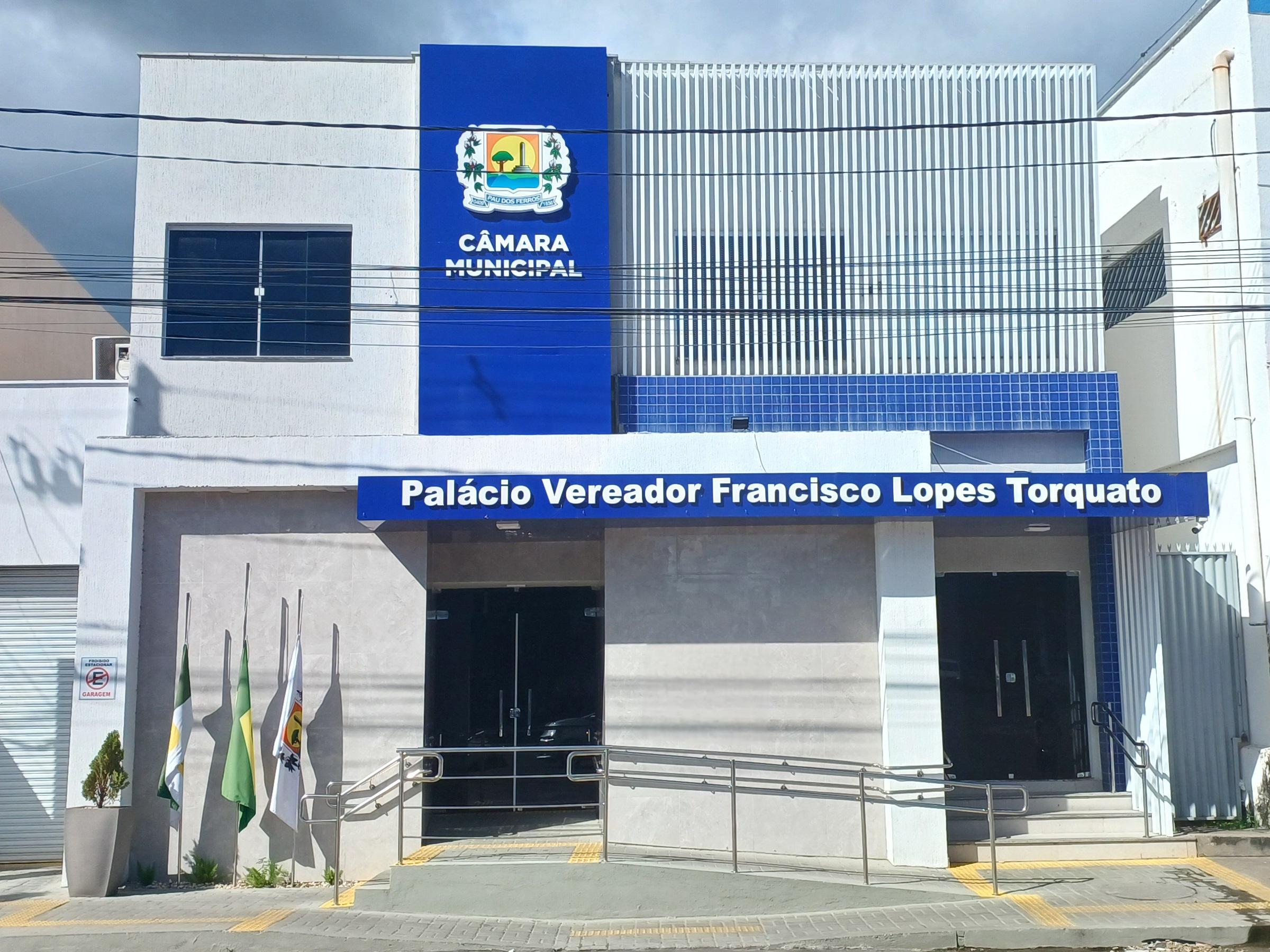
Francisco Lopes Torquato Palace (Municipal Chamber)

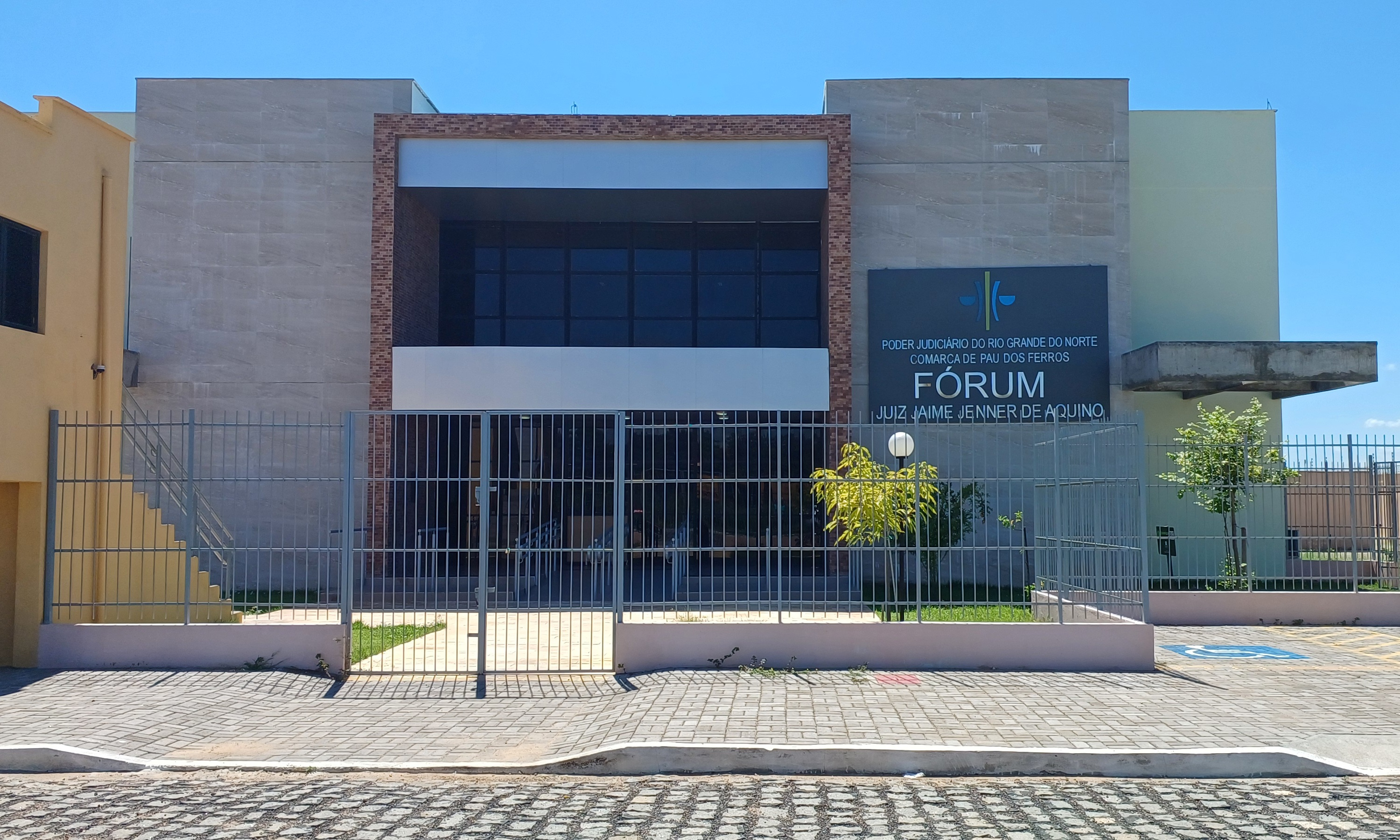
Jaime Jenner de Aquino Forum, home of the Pau dos Ferros District

== Economy ==
The Gross Domestic Product of Pau dos Ferros in 2016 was R$431,562,010, the 19th largest in Rio Grande do Norte and 1,421st in Brazil, with R$225,853,220 from the tertiary sector; R$128,579,650 from administration, healthcare, education, and social security; R$46,785,570 in taxes; R$25,195,280 from industry; and R$5,148,300 from the primary sector. The GDP per capita was R$14,287.29.

In 2010, among the municipal population aged 18 or older, 58% were economically active and employed, 33.8% were inactive, and 8.3% were active but unemployed. Among the active employed population in the same age group, 49.07% worked in services, 22.42% in commerce, 10.21% in agriculture, 8.16% in construction, 5.16% in manufacturing industries, and 0.42% in public utilities. Population growth in Pau dos Ferros necessitated the expansion of banking services for low-income families through federal government policies, which was implemented.

According to the IBGE, in 2017, the municipality had a herd of 18,000 poultry (chickens, roosters, and chicks), 8,500 cattle, 6,500 sheep, 2,500 goats, 2,000 pigs, and 900 equines. Regarding the cultivation of temporary crops that year, 24 tons of corn and 8 tons of beans were produced. In terms of permanent crops, 8,000 coconuts, 34 tons of bananas, 13 tons of mangoes, and 1 ton of cashew nuts were produced. Additionally, 1,829,000 liters of milk from 3,200 milked cows and 1,300 kilograms of honey were produced.

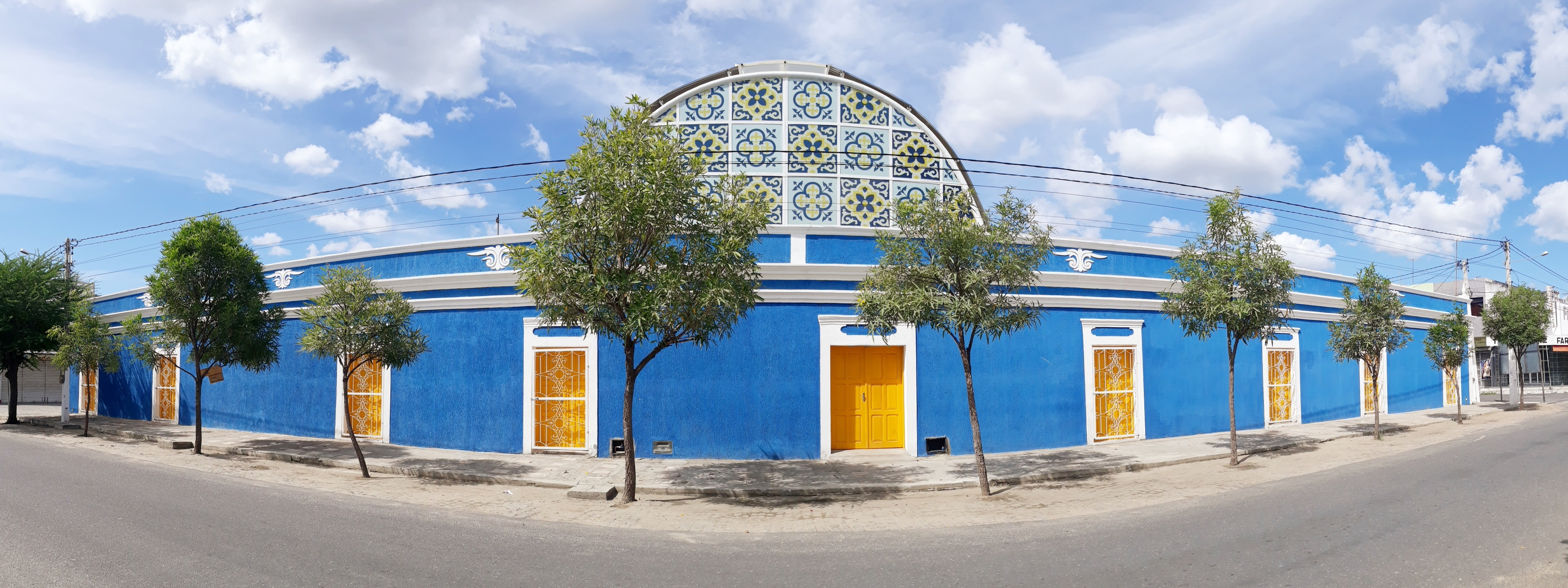
Antônio Soares de Holanda Municipal Market, built in the early 20th century and part of the municipality’s historical and architectural heritage

== Infrastructure ==
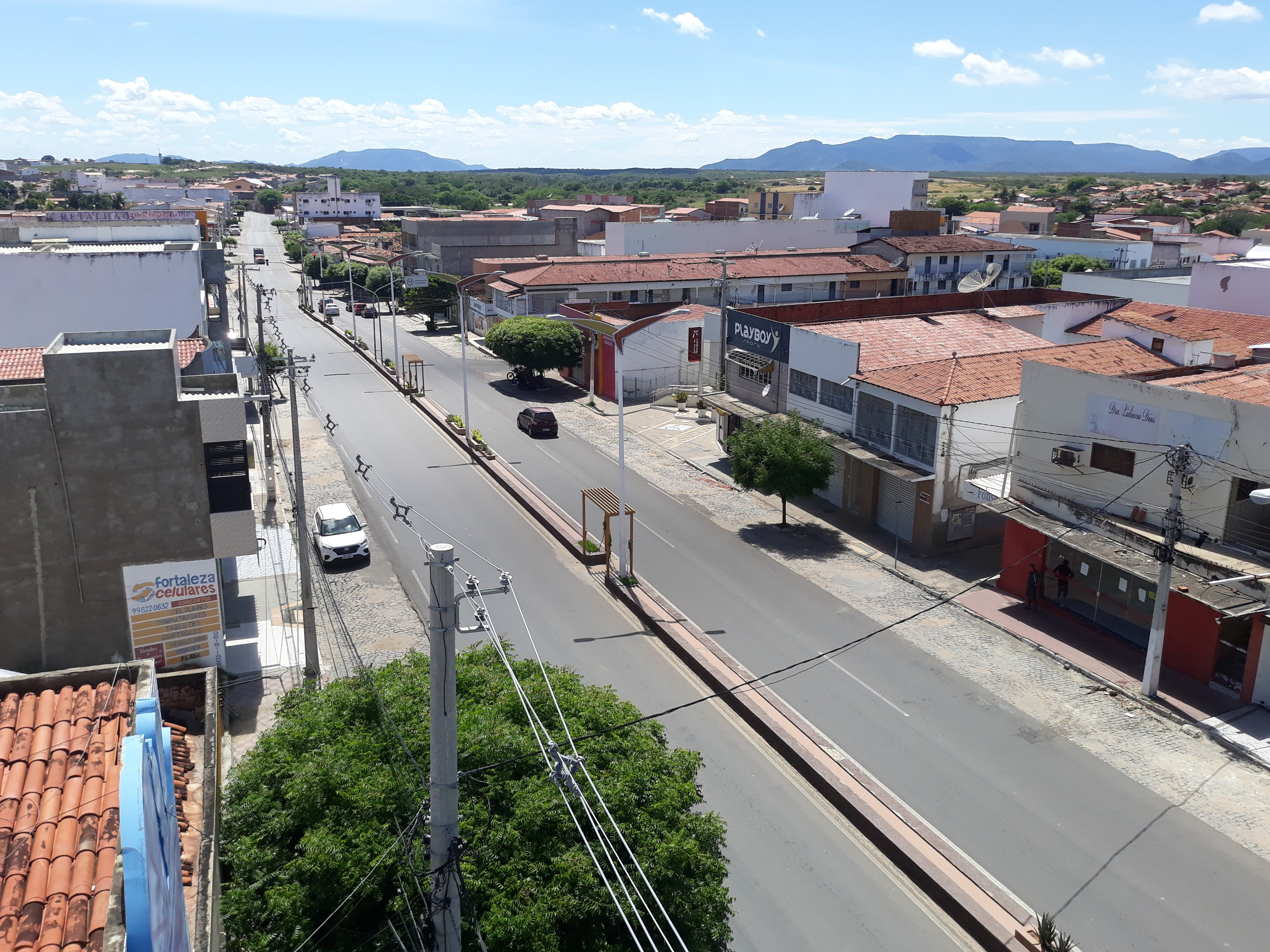
Independence Avenue, the name given to much of the local urban stretch of BR-405 and the main avenue of the city

The water supply service in the municipality of Pau dos Ferros is provided by the Rio Grande do Norte Water and Sewage Company (CAERN). The Rio Grande do Norte Energy Company (COSERN), present in all municipalities of Rio Grande do Norte, is responsible for the supply of electricity, with a nominal voltage of 220 volts. In 2010, the municipality had 98.36% of its households with piped water, 99.61% with electricity, and 90.66% with waste collection. The area code (DDD) for Pau dos Ferros is 084, and the postal code (CEP) is 59900-000. According to 2010 census data, 74.69% of households had only mobile phones, 11.8% had both mobile and landline phones, 2.13% had only landlines, and 11.38% had no phones at all. The municipality is served by four telephone operators: Claro, Oi, TIM, and Vivo.

The municipal vehicle fleet in 2022 consisted of 9,911 motorcycles, 7,205 cars, 2,734 scooters, 1,971 pickup trucks, 753 trucks, 394 vans, 323 utility vehicles, 197 trailers, 99 semi-trailers, 78 mopeds, 76 minibuses, 53 tractor units, 35 buses, and seven tricycles, along with five vehicles in other categories, totaling 23,841 vehicles. In terms of road transport, Pau dos Ferros has a bus terminal, and is intersected by two federal highways: BR-226 and BR-405, as well as RN-177, a state highway connecting Pau dos Ferros to other municipalities in the Alto Oeste Potiguar region. Local road traffic is managed by the Municipal Traffic Department (DEMUTRAN), established by municipal law no. 1,714 on May 27, 2020. For air transport, Pau dos Ferros has a small airport, a former landing field located near the dam, with a runway measuring 1,200 meters in length.

=== Healthcare ===
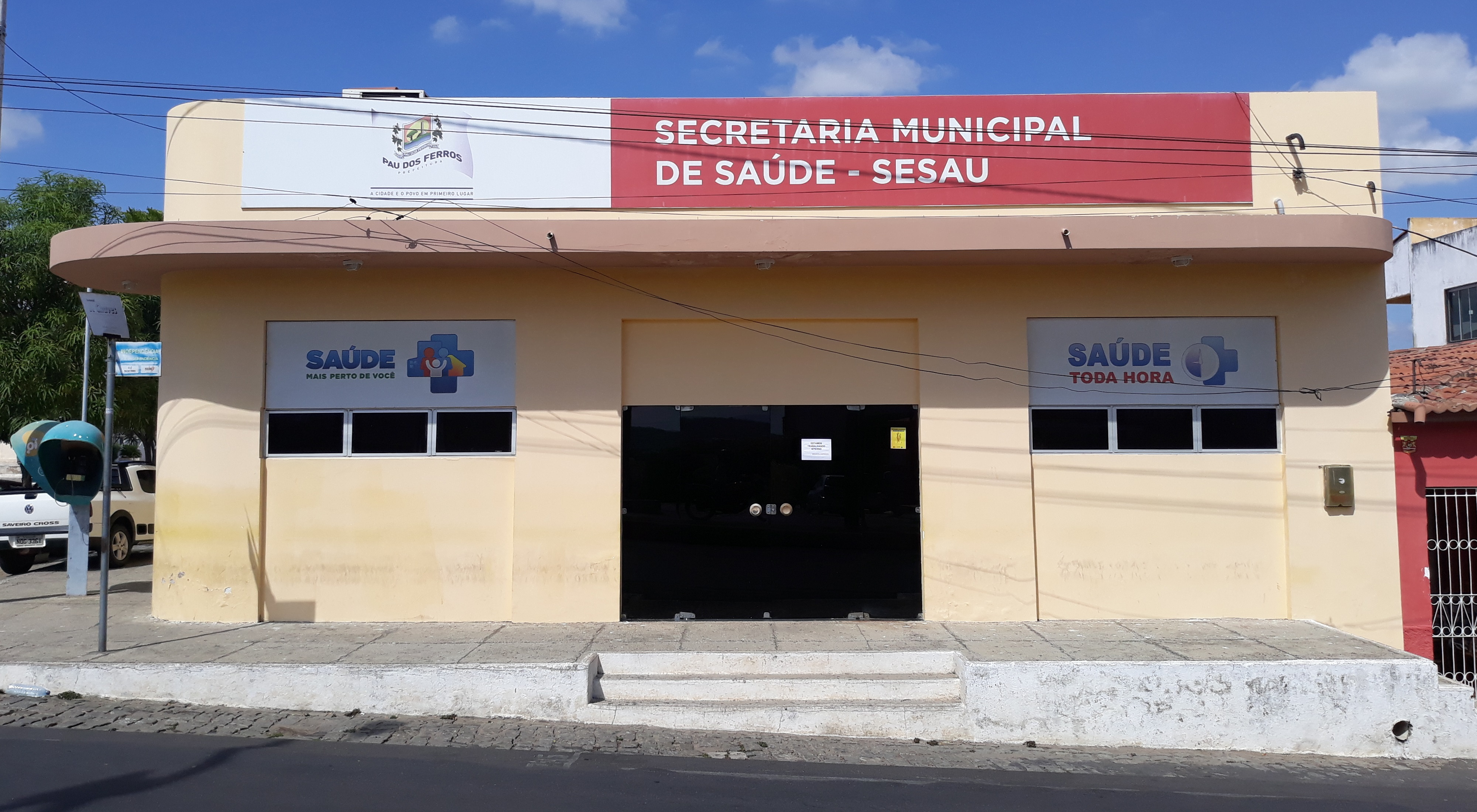
Current headquarters of the Municipal Health Department (SESAU), located at the same site as the former Citizen Service Center

The healthcare network in Pau dos Ferros includes twelve primary healthcare units (UBS), one psychosocial care center (CAPS), and two hospitals, namely the Dr. Nelson Maia Hospital, the oldest, maintained by the Pau dos Ferros Centenário Hospital Association, and the Dr. Cleodon Carlos de Andrade Regional Hospital (HRCCA), inaugurated on March 10, 1990, offering exclusive service to users of the Unified Health System (SUS) and operating 24 hours a day with on-call services. Adjacent to the HRCCA is the headquarters of the VI Regional Public Healthcare Unit of Rio Grande do Norte (VI URSAP), which serves 36 other municipalities in the state.

In April 2010, the municipality's professional healthcare network consisted of 198 physicians, 138 nursing assistants, fifty nursing technicians, 31 nurses, 26 pharmacists, 26 dentists, eleven physiotherapists, nine speech therapists, eight social workers, seven nutritionists, and six psychologists, totaling 510 professionals. In the same year, the life expectancy at birth was 73.2 years, the infant mortality rate was 18.2 per thousand births, and the fertility rate was 2.1 children per woman. According to data from the Ministry of Health, 56 cases of AIDS were recorded in Pau dos Ferros between 1990 and 2016, and from 2001 to 2012, 3,166 cases of dengue and four cases of leishmaniasis were reported.

=== Education ===
IDEB of Pau dos Ferros
Year	Elementary Education		High School
Year	Early Years	Final Years	High School
2005	3.2	2.9	-
2007	3.0	2.7	-
2009	3.7	3.3	-
2011	4.0	3.5	-
2013	4.5	3.6	-
2015	5.2	4.1	-
2017	5.0	4.0	4.3

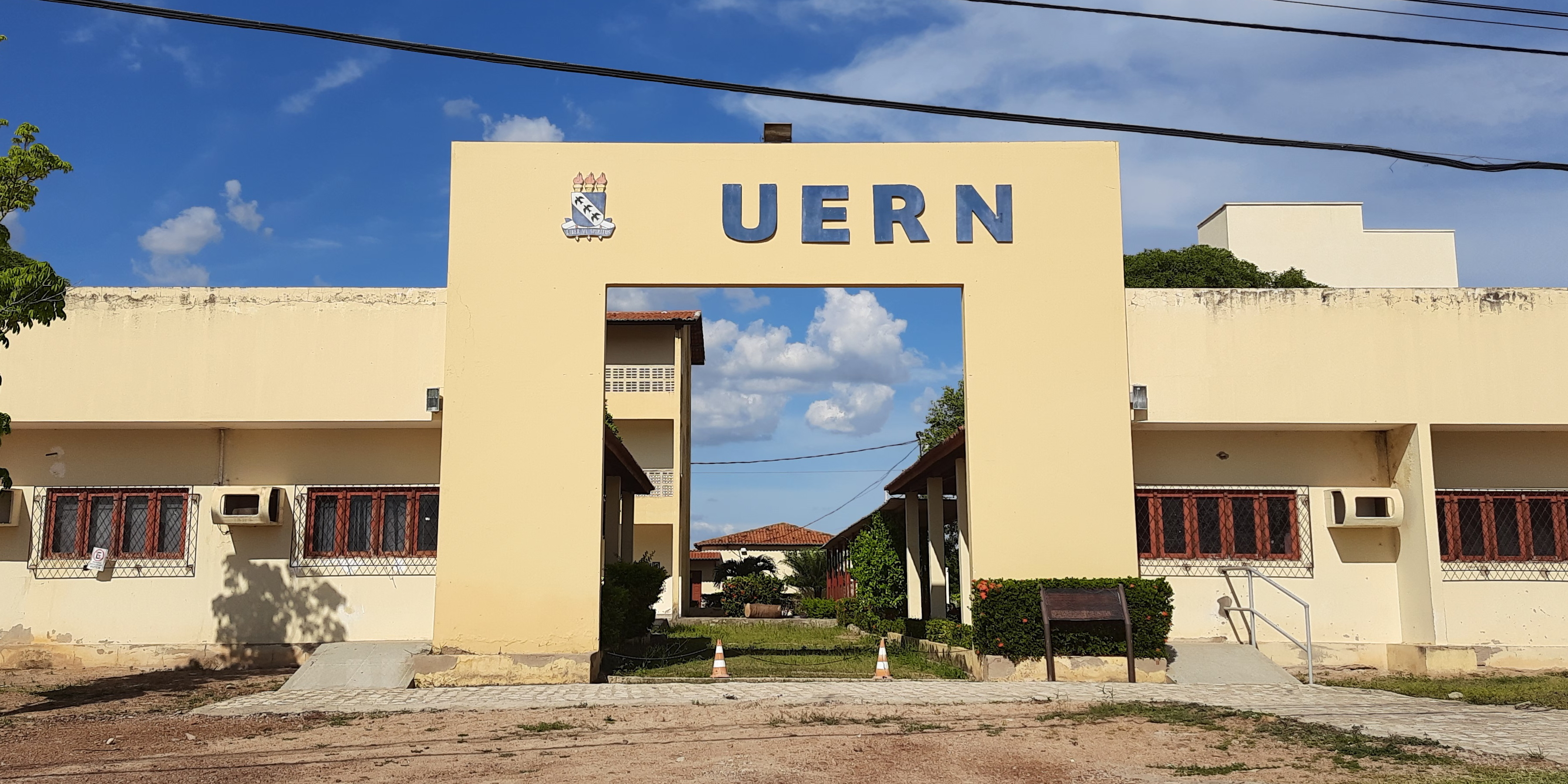
Professora Maria Elisa de Albuquerque Maia Campus, Rio Grande do Norte State University (UERN)

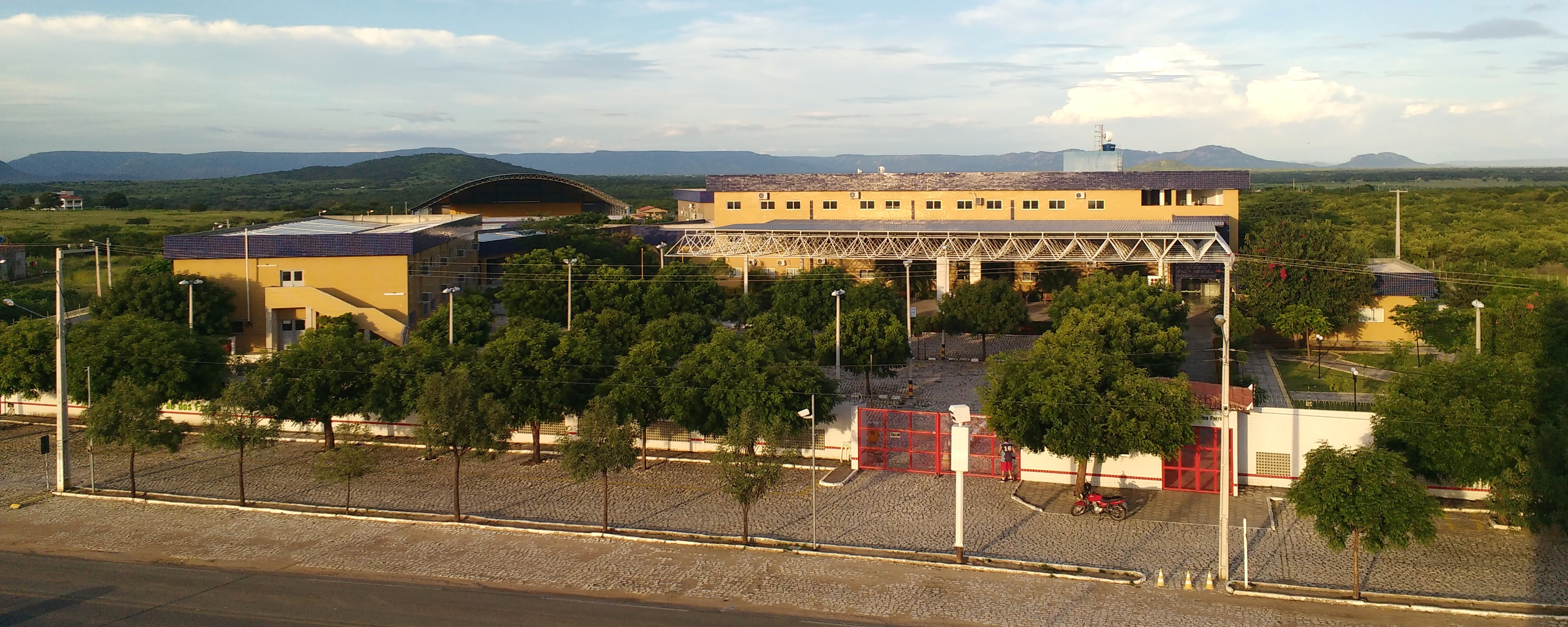
Federal Institute of Rio Grande do Norte (IFRN)

The education factor of the HDI in the municipality reached a score of 0.584 in 2010, while the literacy rate of the population over ten years old, as indicated by the 2010 census, was 83% (78.8% for men and 87% for women). The completion rates for elementary (ages 15 to 17) and high school (ages 18 to 24) were 54.4% and 40.4%, respectively, with a literacy rate of 95.7% for the population aged 15 to 24.

In 2010, Pau dos Ferros had an expected duration of schooling of 10.15 years, higher than the state average (9.54 years). The percentage of children aged five to six in school was 85.64%, and for those aged eleven to thirteen attending elementary school, it was 88.69%. Among young people, the proportion of those aged fifteen to seventeen with completed elementary education was 57.15%, and for those aged 18 to 20 with completed high school, it was 34.58%. Considering only the population aged 25 and older, 40.31% had completed elementary education, 29.45% had completed high school, 22.46% were illiterate, and 9.31% had completed higher education.

In 2018, the age-grade distortion among elementary school students, meaning those older than the recommended age, was 7.2% for the early years and 23.2% for the final years, with a distortion rate of 25.2% in high school. In the same year, the municipality had a network of 24 elementary schools (with 213 teachers), 20 preschools (51 teachers), and five high schools (108 teachers).

In terms of higher education, the municipality has three public higher education institutions: University of the State of Rio Grande do Norte (UERN), Federal Institute of Rio Grande do Norte (IFRN), and Federal Rural University of the Semi-arid Region (UFERSA), the first being state-run and the latter two federally funded. Among private institutions are the Catarina de Siena Nursing School, the Evolução do Alto Oeste Potiguar College (FACEP), the Potiguar University (UnP), and Anhanguera University.

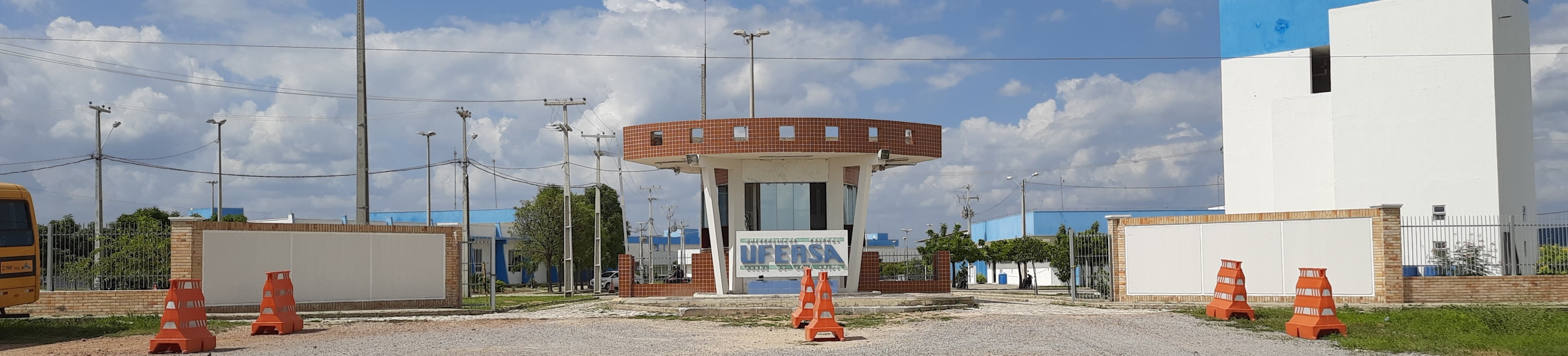
Campus of the Federal Rural University of the Semi-arid Region (UFERSA)

=== Crime and public safety ===
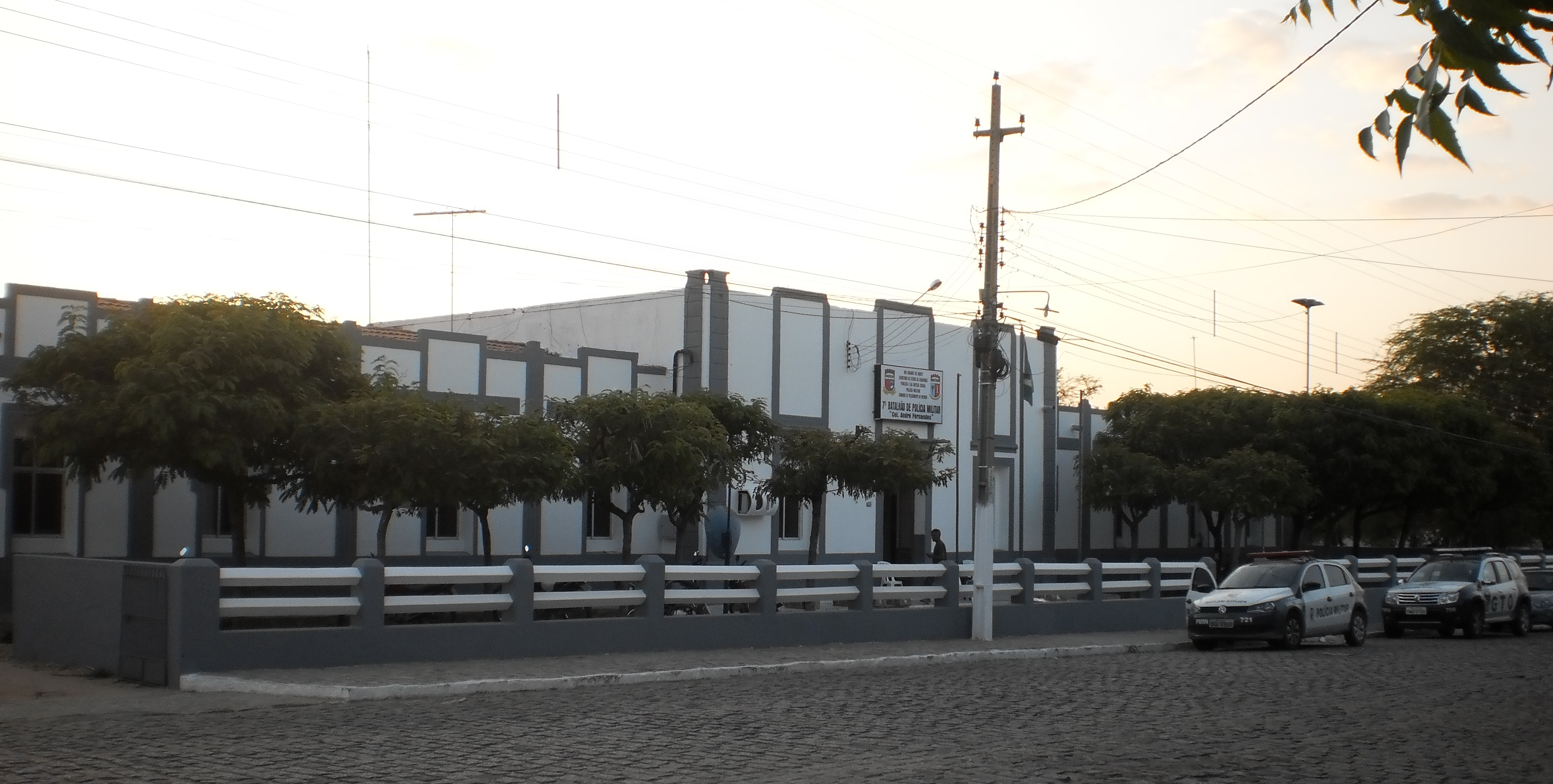
Headquarters of the 7th Military Police Battalion of Rio Grande do Norte “Coronel André Fernandes”

According to the 2016 Violence Map, with data from 2014, published by the Sangari Institute, among municipalities with more than 20,000 inhabitants, the homicide rate by firearms in Pau dos Ferros was 14.9 per 100,000 inhabitants, ranking 36th in the state and 964th nationally.

To strengthen security and reduce crime, the 7th Military Police Battalion (VII BPM), based in Pau dos Ferros, collaborates with local authorities to implement measures related to public safety, such as the establishment of a municipal guard. There are also initiatives to improve the working conditions of police officers and the infrastructure available for their activities, including vehicles, weapons, and facilities used by the force.

Recently, the Pau dos Ferros city government, in partnership with the civil and military state police and the telecommunications provider Brisanet, installed a 24-hour video surveillance system with cameras at strategic points in the city, inaugurated in December 2018, with the operations room located at the VII BPM facilities.

== Culture and leisure ==
The Municipal Secretariat of Culture and Tourism (SECULT) is the municipal government body responsible for education, culture, and tourism in Pau dos Ferros, tasked with organizing cultural and tourism-related activities and projects. Pau dos Ferros is recognized as the National Capital of Language and Literature Studies, a title conferred during the VII National Colloquium of Professors of Portuguese Language and Literature Teaching Methodology, held in August 2010 at the Campus of UERN in the municipality.

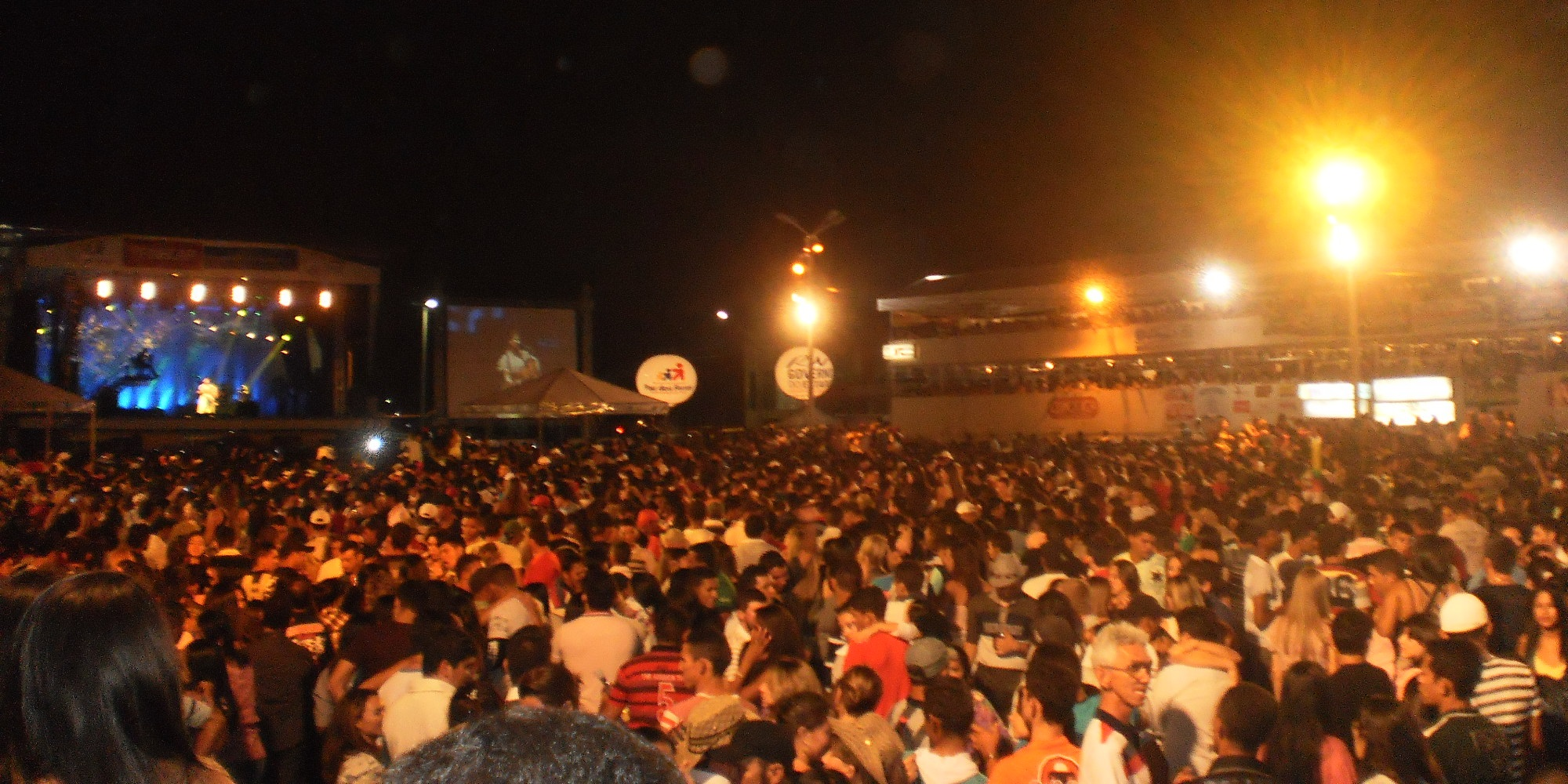
Performance by sertanejo singer Paula Fernandes during FINECAP 2011, celebrating the 155th anniversary of Pau dos Ferros' political emancipation

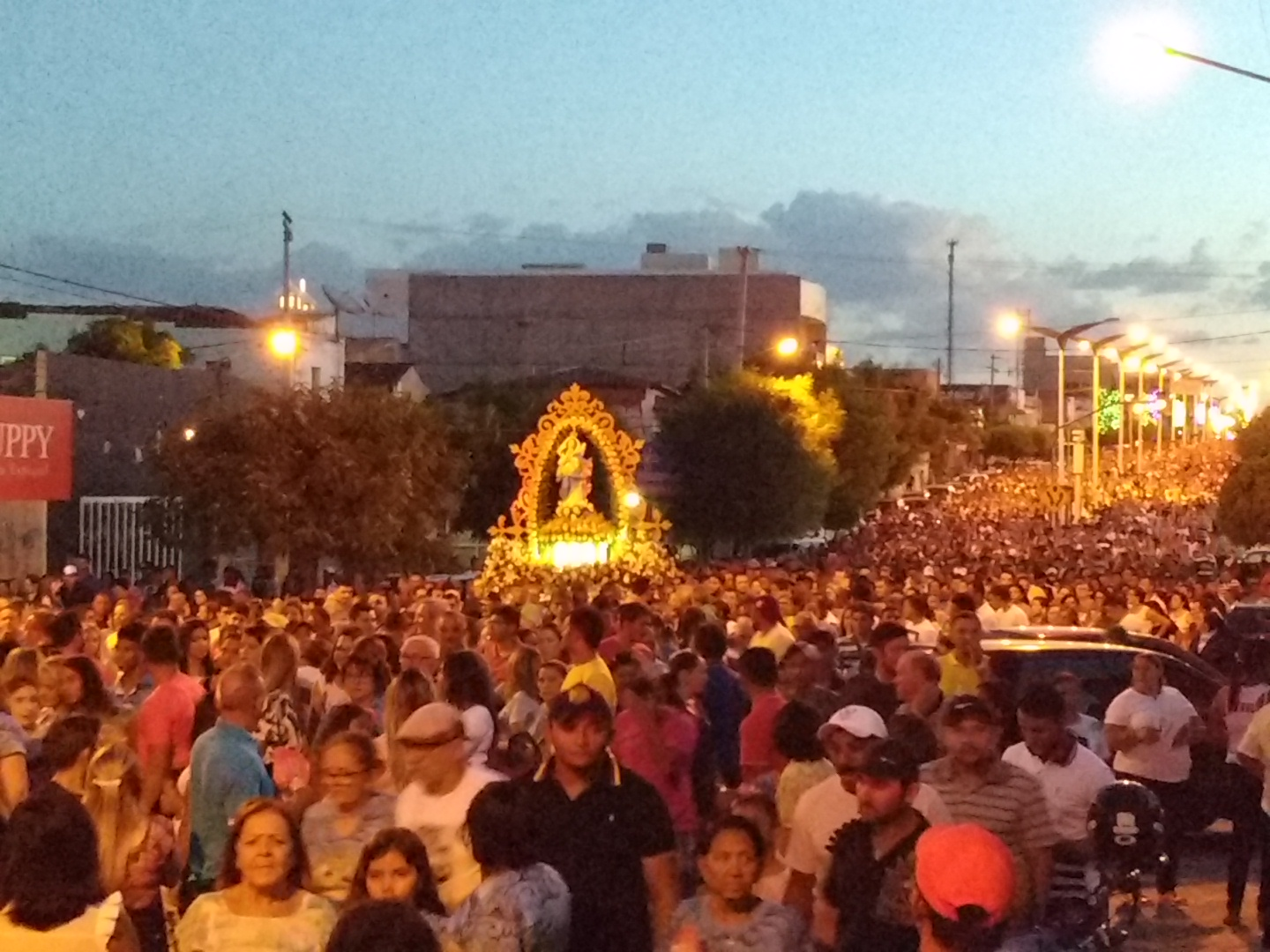
Closing procession of the Feast of Our Lady of the Immaculate Conception, held annually on December 8

Pau dos Ferros features several tourist attractions: the Pau dos Ferros Dam, which supplies water to the municipality's population; the Joaquim Correia Popular Culture House, established in 1911, which housed the municipality's first public school and later the UERN campus in the 1980s; the Our Lady of the Immaculate Conception Matrix Church, the seat of the Pau dos Ferros parish, part of the Diocese of Mossoró; the Obelisk, located in the center of Monsenhor Caminha Square, designed by Bahian architect Oscar de Sousa Lelis at the request of then-mayor José Fernandes de Melo, constructed in May 1955 and dedicated to the population in 1956, marking the municipality's centennial and the parish's bicentennial; and the Our Lady of the Immaculate Conception Events Square, a public leisure area hosting various events organized by the city hall or local institutions, built on a 10,000-square-meter plot and inaugurated on June 25, 2008.

Handicrafts are one of the most spontaneous expressions of Pau dos Ferros' cultural identity, with products made from regional raw materials, such as embroidery and wood, alongside local traditional cuisine. These items are typically sold in shops, fairs, and/or exhibitions, such as the Pauferrense Handicraft Fair (FARPA), held monthly on the last Friday, providing space for the creation, display, and sale of artisanal products, as well as performances and stalls offering traditional foods, contributing to the local economy. The Intermunicipal Fair of Education, Culture, Tourism, and Business of Alto Oeste Potiguar (FINECAP) is another prominent event, held in early September during the municipality's celebration of political emancipation, aimed at businesses, commerce, and industry, featuring exhibitions, performances by singers and bands from various parts of Brazil, and offering leisure, culture, and entertainment for the residents of Pau dos Ferros and neighboring areas.

Other significant events held in Pau dos Ferros include: the "Xanana Diógenes" Cultural Showcase, held since 2005 before FINECAP, featuring artistic and cultural performances, named in honor of one of the municipality's most prominent visual artists; the Cowboy Parade, held on September 4, the city's anniversary, paying tribute to the cowboy, one of the most significant figures in Pau dos Ferros' history; and the feast of the patron saint Our Lady of the Immaculate Conception, which begins on November 28 with an opening mass and flag-raising ceremony, followed by nine nights of novena, concluding on December 8 with masses and a procession carrying the patron saint's image through the city streets, accompanied by stalls selling traditional foods and musical band performances. Through state law 11,870, enacted on August 5, 2024, the feast was recognized as an intangible cultural, historical, and religious heritage of Rio Grande do Norte. September 4 and December 8 are municipal holidays.

Sports-related events are also held, such as the Municipal Football Championship and the Pau-ferrense Cycling Cup. Pau dos Ferros has also excelled in other sports, such as volleyball, with some local teams winning regional and state tournaments. Additionally, there are programs to encourage sports participation.

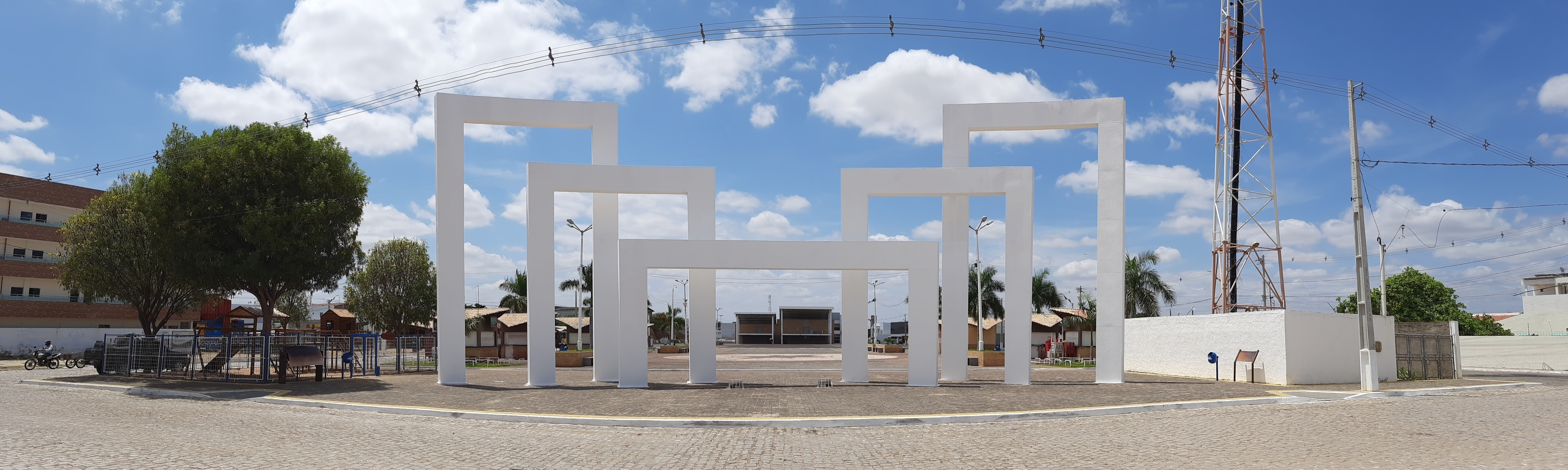
Our Lady of the Immaculate Conception Events Square, where the municipality's main cultural events are held

== Notable people ==
- Antônia (born 1994), footballer for the Brazil national team

== See also ==
- List of municipalities in Rio Grande do Norte
