= Portalegre Municipality =

Portalegre Municipality may refer to:

- Portalegre Municipality, Portugal, a municipality in Portalegre District, Portugal.
- Portalegre, Rio Grande do Norte, a municipality in the state of Rio Grande do Norte in the Northeast region of Brazil.
