= Francisco Dantas =

Municipality in Rio Grande do Norte, Brazil

- Municipality
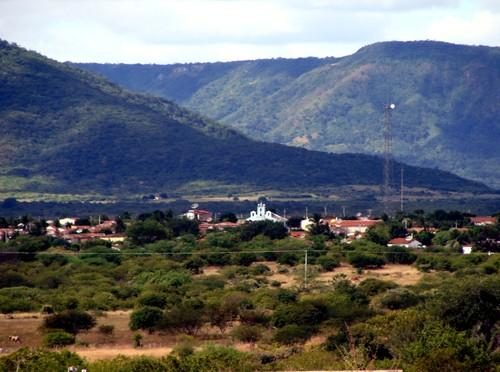

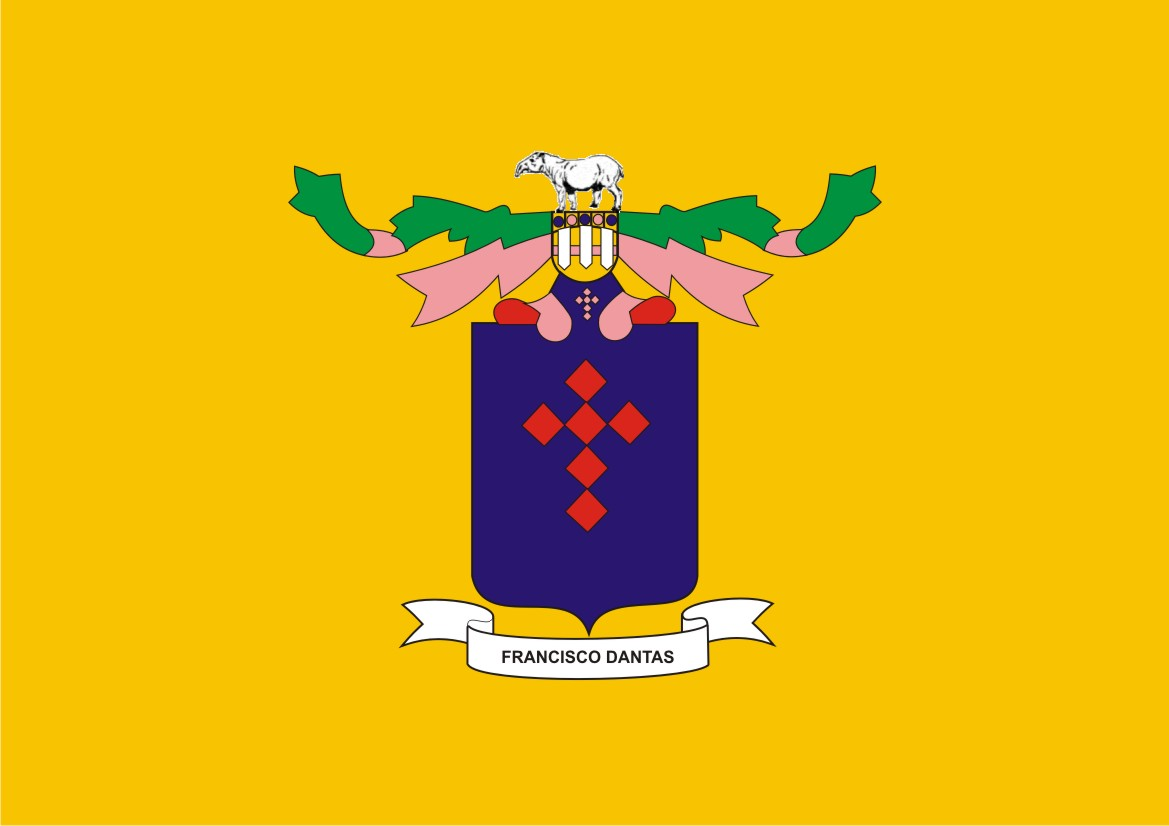
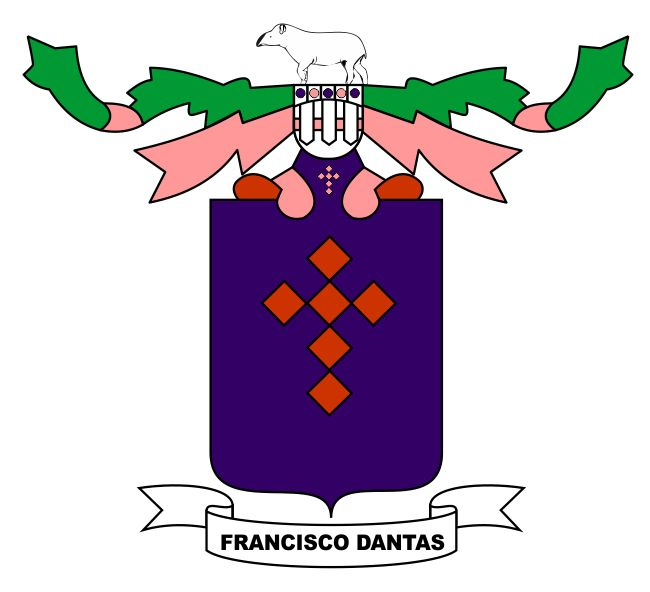
- Flag Coat of arms

- Location in Brazil
- Coordinates: 6°04′S 38°10′W
- Country: Brazil
- Region: Northeast
- State: Rio Grande do Norte
- Mesoregion: Oeste Potiguar

Population (2020)
  - Total: 2,813
- Time zone: UTC -3

Francisco Dantas is a municipality in the state of Rio Grande do Norte in the Northeast region of Brazil.

== See also ==
- List of municipalities in Rio Grande do Norte
