= São Francisco do Oeste =

Municipality in Rio Grande do Norte, Brazil

Coordinates: 5.975°S 38.1519°W

- Municipality
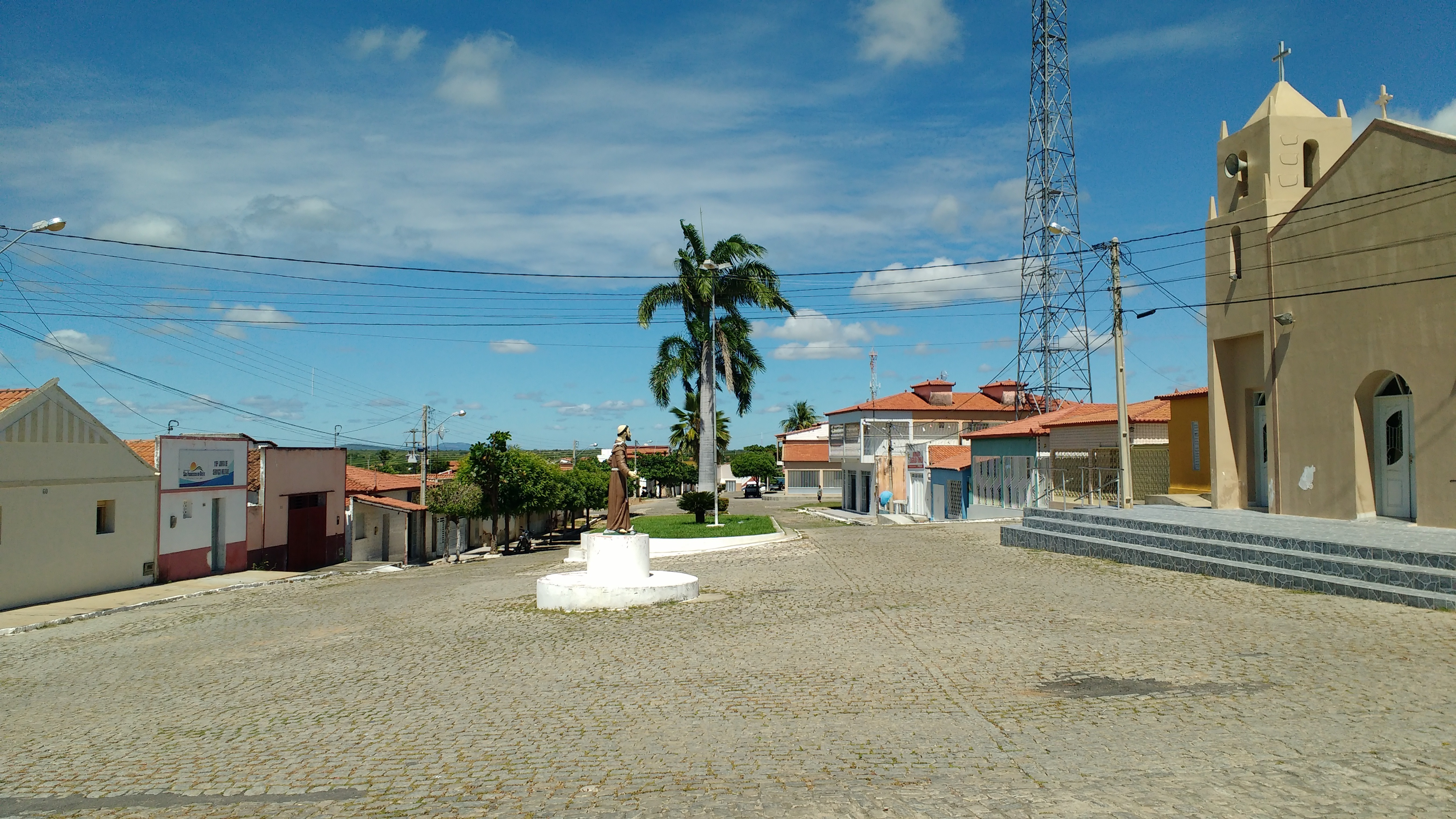

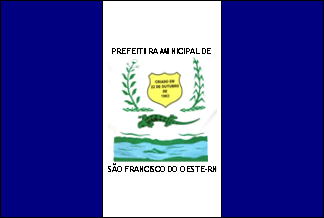
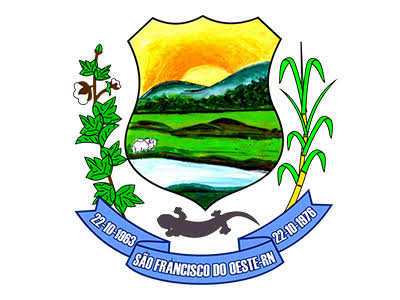
- Flag Coat of arms
- Interactive map of São Francisco do Oeste
- Country: Brazil
- Region: Nordeste
- State: Rio Grande do Norte
- Mesoregion: Oeste Potiguar

Population (2020)
  - Total: 4,255
- Time zone: UTC−3 (BRT)

São Francisco do Oeste is a municipality in the state of Rio Grande do Norte in the Northeast region of Brazil.

== See also ==
- List of municipalities in Rio Grande do Norte
