= Microregion of Agreste Potiguar =

Coordinates: 6°05′24″S 35°33′11″W

Agreste Potiguar
- Microregion
- Country: Brazil
- State: Rio Grande do Norte
- Mesoregion: Agreste Potiguar

Agreste Potiguar was a microregion in the Brazilian state of Rio Grande do Norte.

== Municipalities ==
The microregion consisted of the following municipalities:

- Boa Saúde
- Bom Jesus
- Brejinho
- Ielmo Marinho
- Jundiá
- Lagoa d'Anta
- Lagoa de Pedras
- Lagoa Salgada
- Monte Alegre
- Nova Cruz
- Passa e Fica
- Passagem
- Riachuelo
- Santa Maria
- Santo Antônio
- São Paulo do Potengi
- São Pedro
- Senador Elói de Souza
- Serra Caiada
- Serrinha
- Várzea
- Vera Cruz
