= Boa Saúde =

Municipality in Rio Grande do Norte, Brazil

- Municipality
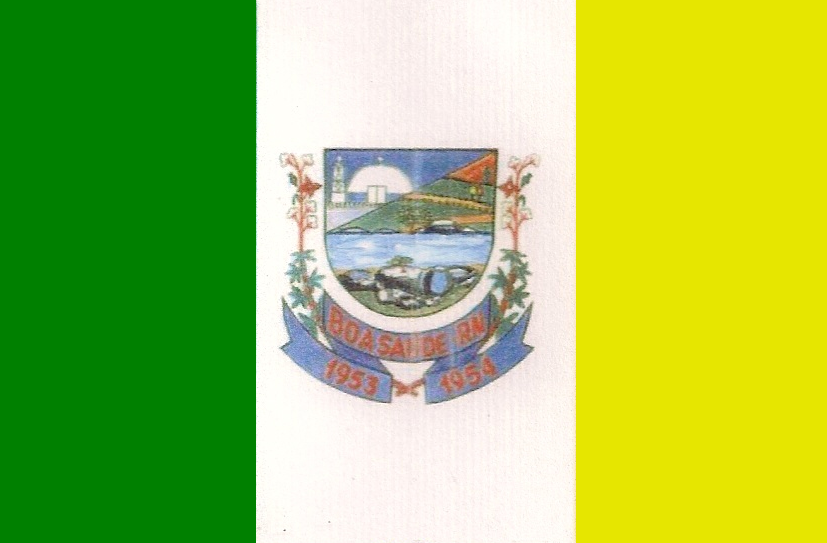
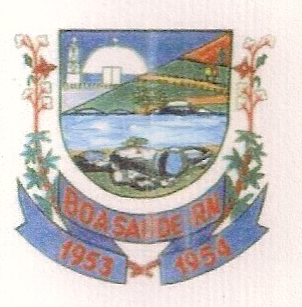
- Flag Coat of arms

- Location in Brazil
- Coordinates: 6°09′S 35°35′W
- Country: Brazil
- Region: Nordeste
- State: Rio Grande do Norte
- Mesoregion: Agreste Potiguar

Population (2022)
  - Total: 9,051
- Time zone: UTC -3

Boa Saúde (formerly Januário Cicco) is a municipality in the state of Rio Grande do Norte in the Northeast region of Brazil. With an area of 167.042 square kilometers (64.495 sq mi), of which 1.6778 square kilometres (0.6478 sq mi) is urban, it is located 59 km from Natal, the state capital, and 1,718 km from Brasília, the federal capital. Its population in the 2022 demographic census was 9,051 inhabitants, according to the Brazilian Institute of Geography and Statistics (IBGE), ranking as the 77th most populous municipality in the state of Rio Grande do Norte.

== Geography ==
The territory of Boa Saúde covers 167.042 square kilometers (64.495 sq mi), of which 1.6778 square kilometres (0.6478 sq mi) constitutes the urban area. It sits at an average altitude of 111 meters above sea level. Boa Saúde borders these municipalities: to the north, Bom Jesus, Macaíba and Senador Elói de Souza; to the south, Serrinha and São José do Campestre; to the east, Lagoa Salgada and Vera Cruz; and to the west, Serra Caiada. The city is located 59 km from the state capital Natal, and 1,718 km from the federal capital Brasília.

Under the territorial division established in 2017 by the Brazilian Institute of Geography and Statistics (IBGE), the municipality belongs to the immediate geographical region of Santo Antônio-Passa e Fica-Nova Cruz, within the intermediate region of Natal. Previously, under the microregion and mesoregion divisions, it was part of the microregion of Agreste Potiguar in the mesoregion of Agreste Potiguar.

== Demographics ==
In the 2022 census, the municipality had a population of 9,051 inhabitants and ranked 77th in the state that year (out of 167 municipalities), with 51.5% male and 48.5% female, resulting in a sex ratio of 106.17 (10,617 men for every 10,000 women), compared to 9,011 inhabitants in the 2010 census (35,61% living in the urban area), when it held the 73rd state position. Between the 2010 and 2022 censuses, the population of Boa Saúde changed at an annual geometric growth rate of -0.01%. Regarding age group in the 2022 census, 67.37% of the inhabitants were between 15 and 64 years old, 21.52% were under fifteen, and 11.11% were 65 or older. The population density in 2022 was 53.01 inhabitants per square kilometer. There were 1,553 housing units with an average of 2.95 inhabitants per household.

The municipality's Human Development Index (HDI-M) was considered medium, according to data from the United Nations Development Programme (UNDP). According to the 2010 report published in 2013, its value was 0.574, ranking 137th in the state and 4,590th nationally (out of 5,565 municipalities), and the Gini coefficient rose from 0.41 in 2003 to 0.52 in 2010. Considering only the longevity index, its value is 0.771, the income index is 0.511, and the education index is 0.481.

== See also ==
- List of municipalities in Rio Grande do Norte
