= Microregion of Borborema Potiguar =

Coordinates: 6.106°S 35.982°W

Borborema Potiguar
- Microregion
- Country: Brazil
- State: Rio Grande do Norte
- Mesoregion: Agreste Potiguar

Borborema Potiguar was a microregion in the Brazilian state of Rio Grande do Norte.

== Municipalities ==
The microregion consisted of the following municipalities:

- Barcelona
- Campo Redondo
- Coronel Ezequiel
- Jaçanã
- Japi
- Lagoa de Velhos
- Lajes Pintadas
- Monte das Gameleiras
- Ruy Barbosa
- Santa Cruz
- São Bento do Trairi
- São José do Campestre
- São Tomé
- Serra de São Bento
- Sítio Novo
- Tangará
