= Bento Fernandes =

Municipality in Rio Grande do Norte, Brazil

- Municipality
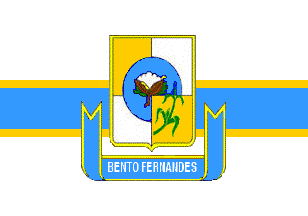
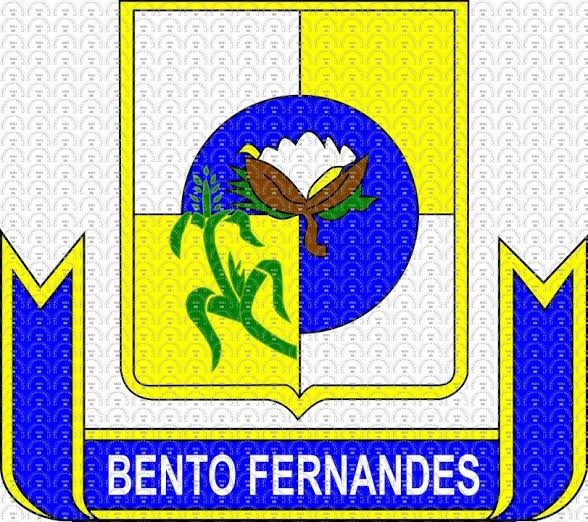
- Flag Coat of arms

- Location in Brazil
- Coordinates: 5°41′S 35°49′W
- Country: Brazil
- Region: Nordeste
- State: Rio Grande do Norte
- Mesoregion: Agreste Potiguar

Population (2022)
  - Total: 4,807
- Time zone: UTC -3

Bento Fernandes is a municipality in the state of Rio Grande do Norte in the Northeast region of Brazil. With an area of 301.069 square kilometers (116.243 sq mi), of which 1.6774 square kilometres (0.6476 sq mi) is urban, it is located 68 km from Natal, the state capital, and 1,734 km from Brasília, the federal capital. Its population in the 2022 demographic census was 4,807 inhabitants, according to the Brazilian Institute of Geography and Statistics (IBGE), ranking as the 118th most populous municipality in the state of Rio Grande do Norte.

== Geography ==
The territory of Bento Fernandes covers 301.069 square kilometers (116.243 sq mi), of which 1.6774 square kilometres (0.6476 sq mi) constitutes the urban area. It sits at an average altitude of 111 meters above sea level. Bento Fernandes borders these municipalities: to the north, João Câmara and Poço Branco; to the south, Riachuelo, Santa Maria, and Ielmo Marinho; to the east, Poço Branco again; and to the west, Jardim de Angicos and Caiçara do Rio do Vento. The city is located 68 km from the state capital Natal, and 1,734 km from the federal capital Brasília.

Under the territorial division established in 2017 by the Brazilian Institute of Geography and Statistics (IBGE), the municipality belongs to the immediate geographical region of Natal, within the intermediate region of Natal. Previously, under the microregion and mesoregion divisions, it was part of the microregion of Baixa Verde in the mesoregion of Agreste Potiguar.

== Demographics ==
In the 2022 census, the municipality had a population of 4,807 inhabitants and ranked 118th in the state that year (out of 167 municipalities), with 50.2% female and 49.8% male, resulting in a sex ratio of 99.21 (9,921 men for every 10,000 women), compared to 5,113 inhabitants in the 2010 census (40.43% living in the urban area), when it held the 115th state position. Between the 2010 and 2022 censuses, the population of Bento Fernandes changed at an annual geometric growth rate of -0.51%. Regarding age group in the 2022 census, 67.89% of the inhabitants were between 15 and 64 years old, 20.65% were under fifteen, and 11.47% were 65 or older. The population density in 2022 was 15.97 inhabitants per square kilometer. There were 1,553 housing units with an average of 3.06 inhabitants per household.

The municipality's Human Development Index (HDI-M) was considered medium, according to data from the United Nations Development Programme (UNDP). According to the 2010 report published in 2013, its value was 0.582, ranking 137th in the state and 4,590th nationally (out of 5,565 municipalities), and the Gini coefficient rose from 0.38 in 2003 to 0.47 in 2010. Considering only the longevity index, its value is 0.727, the income index is 0.542, and the education index is 0.494.

== See also ==
- List of municipalities in Rio Grande do Norte
