= Brejinho, Rio Grande do Norte =

Municipality in Rio Grande do Norte, Brazil

Coordinates: 6°11′27″S 35°21′25″W

- Municipality
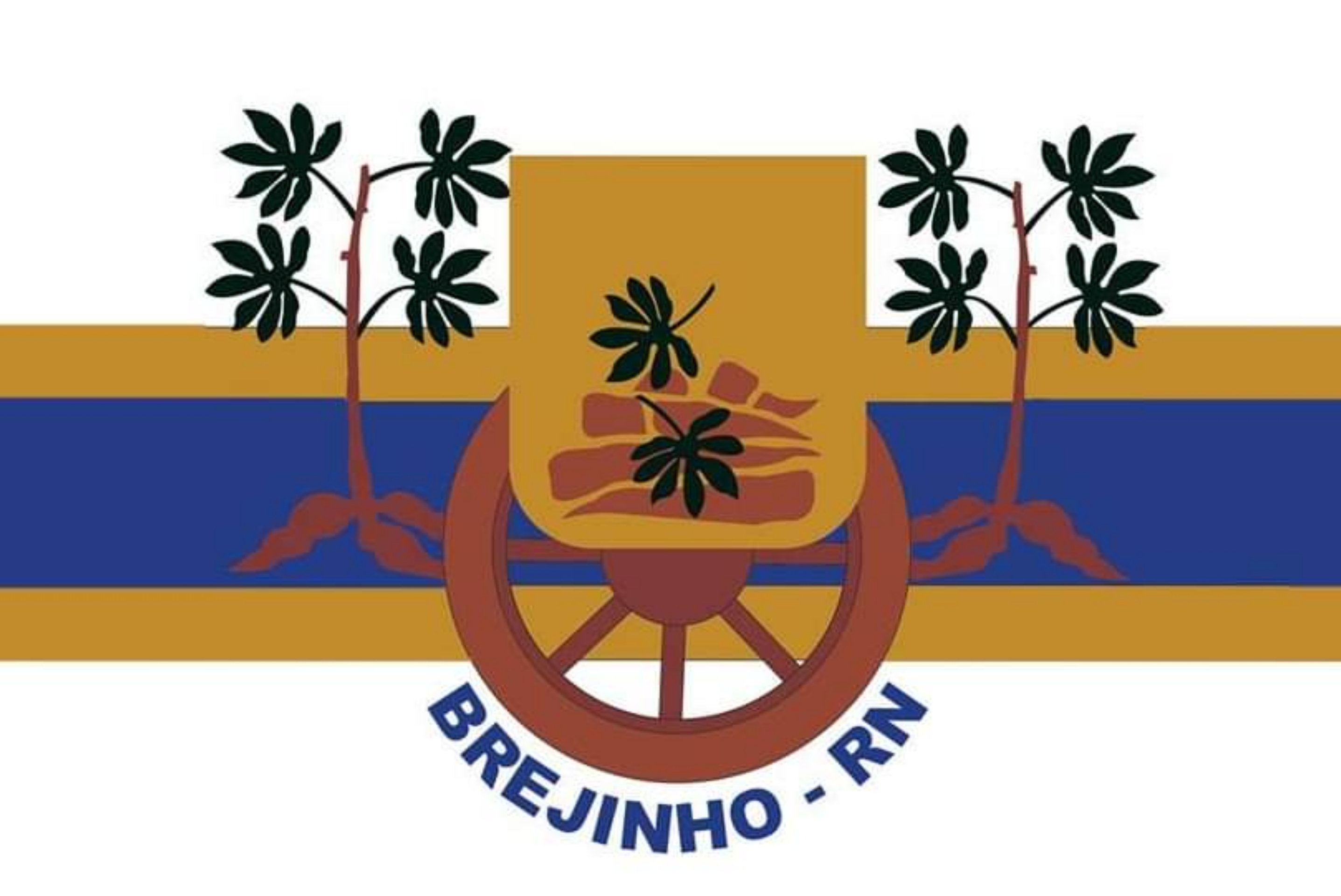
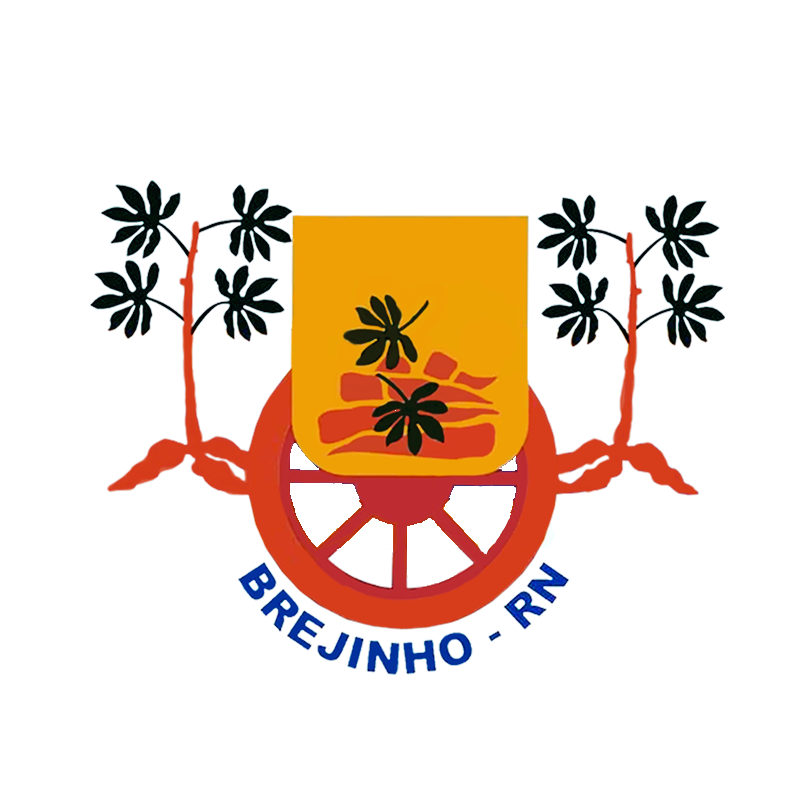
- Flag Coat of arms
- Interactive map of Brejinho, Rio Grande do Norte
- Country: Brazil
- Region: Nordeste
- State: Rio Grande do Norte
- Mesoregion: Agreste Potiguar

Population (2022)
  - Total: 12,202
- Time zone: UTC -3

Brejinho is a municipality in the state of Rio Grande do Norte in the Northeast region of Brazil. With an area of 61.559 square kilometers (23.768 sq mi), of which 2.7031 square kilometres (1.0437 sq mi) is urban, it is located 47 km from Natal, the state capital, and 1,737 km from Brasília, the federal capital. Its population in the 2022 demographic census was 12,202 inhabitants, according to the Brazilian Institute of Geography and Statistics (IBGE), ranking as the 49th most populous municipality in the state of Rio Grande do Norte.

== Geography ==
The territory of Brejinho covers 61.559 square kilometers (23.768 sq mi), of which 2.7031 square kilometres (1.0437 sq mi) constitutes the urban area. It sits at an average altitude of 144 meters above sea level. Brejinho borders these municipalities: to the north, Monte Alegre and Lagoa de Pedras; to the south, Passagem; to the east, Monte Alegre and Jundiá; and to the west, Lagoa de Pedras and Santo Antônio. The city is located 47 km from the state capital Natal, and 1,737 km from the federal capital Brasília.

Under the territorial division established in 2017 by the Brazilian Institute of Geography and Statistics (IBGE), the municipality belongs to the immediate geographical region of Natal, within the intermediate region of Natal. Previously, under the microregion and mesoregion divisions, it was part of the microregion of Agreste Potiguar in the mesoregion of Agreste Potiguar.

== Demographics ==
In the 2022 census, the municipality had a population of 12,202 inhabitants and ranked 46th in the state that year (out of 167 municipalities), with 50.94% female and 49.06% male, resulting in a sex ratio of 96.30 (9,630 men for every 10,000 women), compared to 11,577 inhabitants in the 2010 census (77.09% living in the urban area), when it held the 50th state position. Between the 2010 and 2022 censuses, the population of Brejinho changed at an annual geometric growth rate of 0.44%. Regarding age group in the 2022 census, 67.37% of the inhabitants were between 15 and 64 years old, 21.66% were under fifteen, and 10.97% were 65 or older. The population density in 2022 was 198.22 inhabitants per square kilometer. There were 4.197 housing units with an average of 2.9 inhabitants per household.

The municipality's Human Development Index (HDI-M) was considered medium, according to data from the United Nations Development Programme (UNDP). According to the 2010 report published in 2013, its value was 0.592, ranking 137th in the state and 4,590th nationally (out of 5,565 municipalities), and the Gini coefficient rose from 0.4 in 2003 to 0.5 in 2010. Considering only the longevity index, its value is 0.722, the income index is 0.585, and the education index is 0.492.

== See also ==
- List of municipalities in Rio Grande do Norte
