= Barcelona, Rio Grande do Norte =

Municipality in Rio Grande do Norte, Brazil

Coordinates: 5°56′S 35°56′W

- Municipality
- Flag Coat of arms
- Interactive map of Barcelona, Rio Grande do Norte
- Country: Brazil
- Region: Nordeste
- State: Rio Grande do Norte
- Mesoregion: Agreste Potiguar

Population (2022)
  - Total: 3,986
- Time zone: UTC -3

Barcelona is a municipality in the state of Rio Grande do Norte in the Northeast region of Brazil. With an area of 152.626 square kilometers (58.929 sq mi), of which 0.6748 square kilometres (0.2605 sq mi) is urban, it is located 81 km from Natal, the state capital, and 1,706 km from Brasília, the federal capital. Its population in the 2022 demographic census was 3,986 inhabitants, according to the Brazilian Institute of Geography and Statistics (IBGE), ranking as the 133rd most populous municipality in the state of Rio Grande do Norte.

== Geography ==
The territory of Barcelona covers 152.626 square kilometers (58.929 sq mi), of which 0.6748 square kilometres (0.2605 sq mi) constitutes the urban area. It sits at an average altitude of 124 meters above sea level. Barcelona borders these municipalities: to the north, Ruy Barbosa and Riachuelo; to the south, Lagoa de Velhos and Sítio Novo; to the east, São Paulo do Potengi, Lagoa de Velhos, and Riachuelo; and to the west, São Tomé. The city is located 81 km from the state capital Natal, and 1,706 km from the federal capital Brasília.

Under the territorial division established in 2017 by the Brazilian Institute of Geography and Statistics (IBGE), the municipality belongs to the immediate geographical region of São Paulo do Potengi, within the intermediate region of Natal. Previously, under the microregion and mesoregion divisions, it was part of the microregion of Borborema Potiguar in the mesoregion of Agreste Potiguar.

== Demographics ==
In the 2022 census, the municipality had a population of 3,986 inhabitants and ranked only 133rd in the state that year (out of 167 municipalities), with 50.58% female and 49.42% male, resulting in a sex ratio of 97.72 (9,772 men for every 10,000 women), compared to 3,950 inhabitants in the 2010 census (44,46% living in the urban area), when it held the 132nd state position. Between the 2010 and 2022 censuses, the population of Barcelona changed at an annual geometric growth rate of 0.08%. Regarding age group in the 2022 census, 68.27% of the inhabitants were between 15 and 64 years old, 18.16% were under fifteen, and 13.56% were 65 or older. The population density in 2022 was 26.12 inhabitants per square kilometer, with an average of 2.87 inhabitants per household.

The municipality's Human Development Index (HDI-M) is considered medium, according to data from the United Nations Development Programme. According to the 2010 report published in 2013, its value was 0.566, ranking 154th in the state and 4,921st nationally (out of 5,565 municipalities), and the Gini coefficient rose from 0.39 in 2003 to 0.5 in 2010. Considering only the longevity index, its value is 0.726, the income index is 0.564, and the education index is 0.442.

== See also ==
- List of municipalities in Rio Grande do Norte
