= Bom Jesus, Rio Grande do Norte =

Municipality in Rio Grande do Norte, Brazil

Bom Jesus
- Municipality
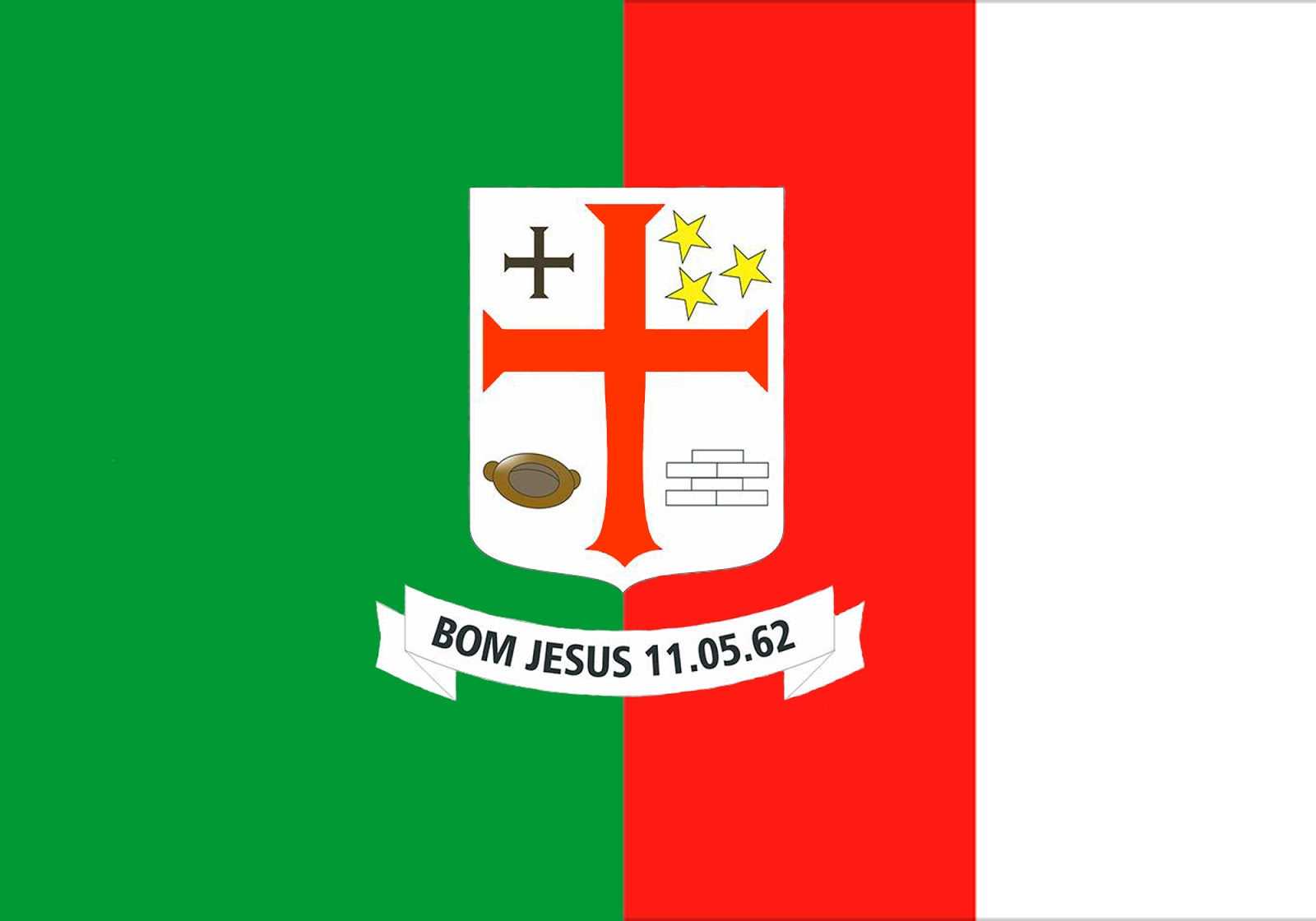
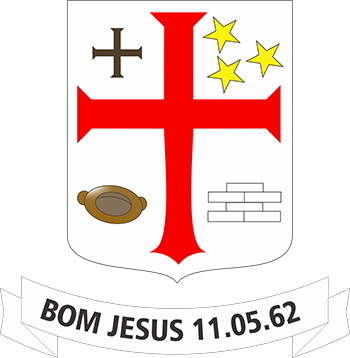
- Flag Coat of arms
- Motto: Pax et gloria "Paz e glória"

- Location in Brazil
- Coordinates: 05°59′02″S 35°34′51″W
- Country: Brazil
- Region: Nordeste
- State: Rio Grande do Norte
- Mesoregion: Agreste Potiguar

Government
  - Mayor: José Nilson Pereira da Silva (PL)

Area
  - Total: 122.035 km^{2} (47.118 sq mi)

Population (2022)
  - Total: 9,952
- Time zone: UTC −3

Bom Jesus is a municipality in the state of Rio Grande do Norte in the Northeast region of Brazil. With an area of 122.035 square kilometers (47.118 sq mi), of which 1.937 square kilometres (0.748 sq mi) is urban, it is located 47 km from Natal, the state capital, and 1,732 km from Brasília, the federal capital. Its population in the 2022 demographic census was 9,952 inhabitants, according to the Brazilian Institute of Geography and Statistics (IBGE), ranking as the 70th most populous municipality in the state of Rio Grande do Norte.

== Geography ==
The territory of Bom Jesus covers 122.035 square kilometers (47.118 sq mi), of which 1.937 square kilometres (0.748 sq mi) constitutes the urban area. It sits at an average altitude of 98 meters above sea level. Bom Jesus borders these municipalities: to the north, São Pedro and Parnamirim; to the south, Boa Saúde; to the east, Macaíba; and to the west, Senador Elói de Souza. The city is located 47 km from the state capital Natal, and 1,732 km from the federal capital Brasília.

Under the territorial division established in 2017 by the Brazilian Institute of Geography and Statistics (IBGE), the municipality belongs to the immediate geographical region of Natal, within the intermediate region of Natal. Previously, under the microregion and mesoregion divisions, it was part of the microregion of Agreste Potiguar in the mesoregion of Agreste Potiguar.

== Demographics ==
In the 2022 census, the municipality had a population of 9,952 inhabitants and ranked 70th in the state that year (out of 167 municipalities), with 51.92% female and 48.08% male, resulting in a sex ratio of 92.61 (9,261 men for every 10,000 women), compared to 9,440 inhabitants in the 2010 census (71.69% living in the urban area), when it held the 70th state position. Between the 2010 and 2022 censuses, the population of Bom Jesus changed at an annual geometric growth rate of 0.44%. Regarding age group in the 2022 census, 68% of the inhabitants were between 15 and 64 years old, 20.8% were under fifteen, and 11.2% were 65 or older. The population density in 2022 was 81.55 inhabitants per square kilometer. There were 3,455 housing units with an average of 2.87 inhabitants per household.

The municipality's Human Development Index (HDI-M) was considered low, according to data from the United Nations Development Programme (UNDP). According to the 2010 report published in 2013, its value was 0.584, ranking 132nd in the state and 4,540th nationally (out of 5,565 municipalities), and the Gini coefficient rose from 0.39 in 2003 to 0.54 in 2010. Considering only the longevity index, its value is 0.743, the income index is 0.583, and the education index is 0.46.

== See also ==
- List of municipalities in Rio Grande do Norte
