= Campo Redondo =

Municipality in Rio Grande do Norte, Brazil

- Municipality
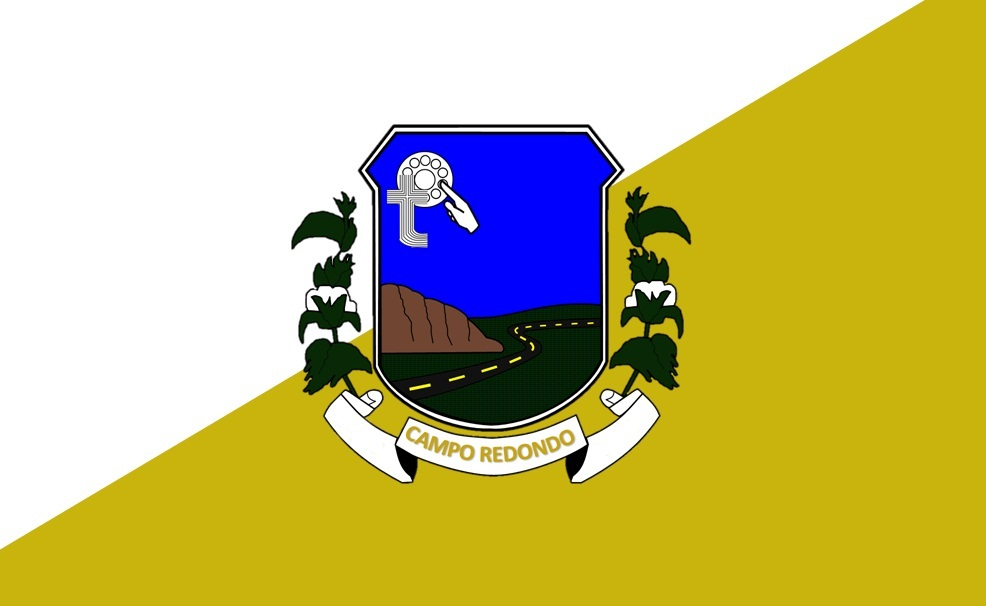
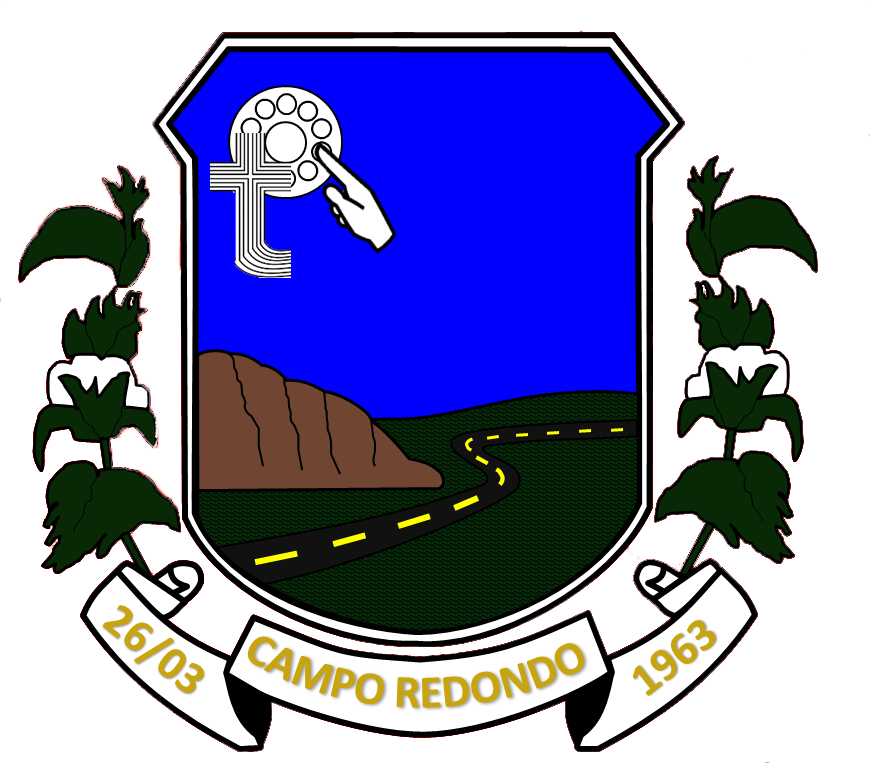
- Flag Coat of arms

- Location in Brazil
- Coordinates: 6°14′34″S 36°10′58″W
- Country: Brazil
- Region: Nordeste
- State: Rio Grande do Norte
- Mesoregion: Agreste Potiguar

Population (2022)
  - Total: 10,215
- Time zone: UTC -3

Campo Redondo is a municipality in the state of Rio Grande do Norte in the Northeast region of Brazil. With an area of 213.727 square kilometers (82.520 sq mi), of which 2.9833 square kilometres (1.1519 sq mi) is urban, it is located 119 km from Natal, the state capital, and 1,663 km from Brasília, the federal capital. Its population in the 2022 demographic census was 10,215 inhabitants, according to the Brazilian Institute of Geography and Statistics (IBGE), ranking as the 65th most populous municipality in the state of Rio Grande do Norte.

== Geography ==
The territory of Campo Redondo covers 213.727 square kilometers (82.520 sq mi), of which 2.9833 square kilometres (1.1519 sq mi) constitutes the urban area. It sits at an average altitude of 471 meters above sea level. Campo Redondo is bordered by the municipalities of São Tomé and Lajes Pintadas (north), Currais Novos (west), Santa Cruz (east) and Coronel Ezequiel (south). It is also bordered by the state of Paraíba (southwest). The city is located 119 km from the state capital Natal, and 1,663 km from the federal capital Brasília.

Under the territorial division established in 2017 by the Brazilian Institute of Geography and Statistics (IBGE), the municipality belongs to the immediate geographical region of Natal, within the intermediate region of Natal. Previously, under the microregion and mesoregion divisions, it was part of the microregion of Borborema Potiguar in the mesoregion of Agreste Potiguar.

== Demographics ==
In the 2022 census, the municipality had a population of 10,215 inhabitants and ranked 65th in the state that year (out of 167 municipalities), with 50.89% female and 49.11% male, resulting in a sex ratio of 96.52 (9,652 men for every 10,000 women), compared to 10,266 inhabitants in the 2010 census (50,62% living in the urban area), when it held the 65th state position. Between the 2010 and 2022 censuses, the population of Campo Redondo changed at an annual geometric growth rate of -0.04%. Regarding age group in the 2022 census, 56.69% of the inhabitants were between 15 and 64 years old, 19.55% were under fifteen, and 23.76% were 65 or older. The population density in 2022 was 47.79 inhabitants per square kilometer. There were 3,467 housing units with an average of 2.94 inhabitants per household.

The municipality's Human Development Index (HDI-M) was considered medium, according to data from the United Nations Development Programme (UNDP). According to the 2010 report published in 2013, its value was 0.626, ranking 43rd in the state and 3,561st nationally (out of 5,565 municipalities), and the Gini coefficient rose from 0.41 in 2003 to 0.56 in 2010. Considering only the longevity index, its value is 0.758, the income index is 0.554, and the education index is 0.584.

== See also ==
- List of municipalities in Rio Grande do Norte
