= Coronel Ezequiel =

Municipality in Rio Grande do Norte, Brazil

- Municipality
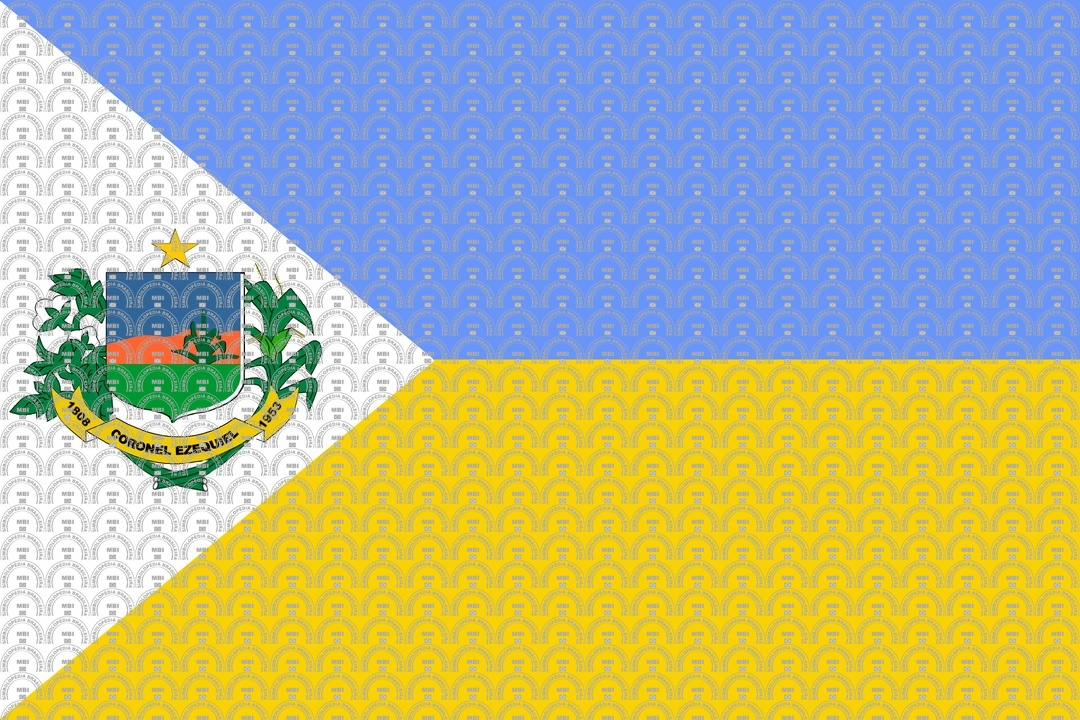
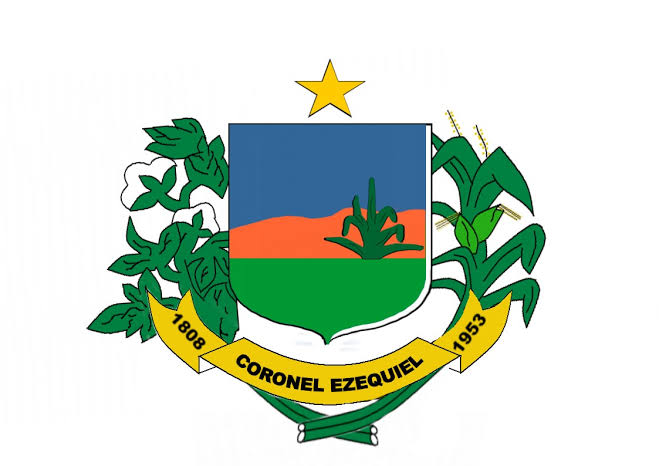
- Flag Coat of arms

- Location in Brazil
- Coordinates: 6°23′S 36°11′W
- Country: Brazil
- Region: Nordeste
- State: Rio Grande do Norte
- Mesoregion: Agreste Potiguar

Population (2022)
  - Total: 5,117
- Time zone: UTC -3

Coronel Ezequiel is a municipality in the state of Rio Grande do Norte in the Northeast region of Brazil. With an area of 185.748 square kilometers (71.718 sq mi), of which 0.8866 square kilometres (0.3423 sq mi) is urban, it is located 129 km from Natal, the state capital, and 1,650 km from Brasília, the federal capital. Its population in the 2022 demographic census was 5,117 inhabitants, according to the Brazilian Institute of Geography and Statistics (IBGE), ranking as the 114th most populous municipality in the state of Rio Grande do Norte.

== Geography ==
The territory of Coronel Ezequiel covers 185.748 square kilometers (71.718 sq mi), of which 0.8866 square kilometres (0.3423 sq mi) constitutes the urban area. It sits at an average altitude of 584 meters above sea level. Coronel Ezequiel borders these municipalities: to the north, Campo Redondo and Santa Cruz; to the south, Jaçanã; to the east, São Bento do Trairi; and to the west, the state of Paraíba. The city is located 129 km from the state capital Natal, and 1,650 km from the federal capital Brasília.

Under the territorial division established in 2017 by the Brazilian Institute of Geography and Statistics (IBGE), the municipality belongs to the immediate geographical region of Natal, within the intermediate region of Natal. Previously, under the microregion and mesoregion divisions, it was part of the microregion of Borborema Potiguar in the mesoregion of Agreste Potiguar.

== Demographics ==
In the 2022 census, the municipality had a population of 5,117 inhabitants and ranked 114th in the state that year (out of 167 municipalities), with 50.32% female and 49.68% male, resulting in a sex ratio of 101.3 (10,130 men for every 10,000 women), compared to 5,405 inhabitants in the 2010 census (42.05% living in the urban area), when it held the 110th state position. Between the 2010 and 2022 censuses, the population of Coronel Ezequiel changed at an annual geometric growth rate of -0.46%. Regarding age group in the 2022 census, 67.09% of the inhabitants were between 15 and 64 years old, 19.46% were under fifteen, and 13.44% were 65 or older. The population density in 2022 was 27.55 inhabitants per square kilometer. There were 1,883 housing units with an average of 2.72 inhabitants per household.

The municipality's Human Development Index (HDI-M) was considered low, according to data from the United Nations Development Programme (UNDP). According to the 2010 report published in 2013, its value was 0.587, ranking 132nd in the state and 4,467th nationally (out of 5,565 municipalities), and the Gini coefficient rose from 0.4 in 2003 to 0.54 in 2010. Considering only the longevity index, its value is 0.778, the income index is 0.545, and the education index is 0.476.

== See also ==
- List of municipalities in Rio Grande do Norte
