= Caicara =

Caicara or Caiçara may refer to:

== People ==
- Caiçaras, the traditional population of the coastal regions of the southeast and south of Brazil
- Júnior Caiçara (born 1989), Brazilian footballer

== Places ==
=== Brazil ===
- Caiçaras Club, a private club on the island of Caiçara in Rodrigo de Freitas Lagoon, Rio de Janeiro, Brazil
- Caiçara do Norte, municipality in the state of Rio Grande do Norte, Brazil
- Caiçara do Rio do Vento, municipality in the state of Rio Grande do Norte, Brazil
- Caiçara, Rio Grande do Sul, a municipality in the state of Rio Grande do Sul, Brazil
- Caiçara, Paraíba, a municipality in the state of Paraíba, Brazil
- Caiçara Esporte Clube, a Brazilian football (soccer) club

=== Venezuela ===
- Caicara de Maturín, municipal seat of Cedeño Municipality, Monagas
- Caicara del Orinoco, municipal seat of Cedeño Municipality, Bolivar

== Film ==
- Caiçara (film), a 1950 Brazilian film by Adolfo Celi

== See also ==
- Viola caiçara, a guitar-like stringed instrument from Brazil
