= Barcelona (disambiguation) =

Barcelona is a city in northeastern Spain and the capital city of Catalonia.

Barcelona may also refer to:

== Places ==
=== Catalonia ===
- County of Barcelona, a historical Catalan county
- Province of Barcelona, one of the four provinces of Catalonia, Spain
  - Barcelona (Congress of Deputies constituency), covering the province
  - Barcelona (Parliament of Catalonia constituency), covering the province
  - Barcelona (Senate constituency), covering the province

=== Elsewhere ===
- Barcelona, Anzoátegui, the capital city of Anzoátegui State in Venezuela
- Barcelona, Cornwall, a hamlet in England
- Barcelona, Danlí, El Paraíso, a hamlet in Honduras
- Barcelona, Rio Grande do Norte, Brazil
- Barcelona, Sorsogon, a municipality in the Philippines
- Barcelona Light, a lighthouse in Westfield, New York, United States

== People ==
- Count of Barcelona, former ruler of the County of Barcelona
- Danny Barcelona, jazz drummer best known for his work with Louis Armstrong
- Julie F. Barcelona, Filipina botanist

== Arts, entertainment, and media ==
=== Music ===
==== Groups ====
- Barcelona (band), an indie band from Arlington, Virginia
- Barcelona (indie rock band), an indie rock band from Seattle, Washington

==== Works ====
- "Barcelona", a song by Stephen Sondheim from the musical Company, 1970
- Barcelona (Freddie Mercury and Montserrat Caballé album), 1988
  - "Barcelona" (Freddie Mercury and Montserrat Caballé song) (1987), a song on the album
- Barcelona (Joe Henderson album), 1979
- "Barcelona" (BWO song), 2008
- "Barcelona", a song by D.Kay & Epsilon featuring Stamina MC
- "Barcelona", a song by Ronnie Lane with Eric Clapton. from the album See Me (1979)
- "Barcelona", a song by Maliq & D'Essentials with Fariz RM
- "Barcelona", a song by Nat Shilkret and the Victor Orchestra
- "Barcelona" (Pectus song), a song by Pectus (2012)
- "Barcelona" (George Ezra song), a song by George Ezra from Wanted on Voyage (2014)
- "Barcelona" (Ed Sheeran song), a song by Ed Sheeran from ÷ (2017)

=== Other art. entertainment, and media ===
- Barcelona (film), a 1994 American film is set in Barcelona, Catalonia
- Barcelona: A Love Untold, a 2016 Philippine film is set in Barcelona, Catalonia
- Barcelona chair, a chair designed by Ludwig Mies van der Rohe

== Astronomical bodies ==
- Barcelona (meteorite), a meteorite which fell in Catalonia in the year 1704
- 945 Barcelona, an asteroid

== Sports ==
=== FC Barcelona family ===
- FC Barcelona, a football club from Barcelona, Catalonia
  - FC Barcelona Atlètic, the reserve team of FC Barcelona
  - FC Barcelona C, was the second reserve team of FC Barcelona
  - FC Barcelona Femení, the women's football team of FC Barcelona
- FC Barcelona Bàsquet, the men's basketball section of FC Barcelona
- FC Barcelona Futsal, the futsal section of FC Barcelona
- FC Barcelona Handbol, the team handball section of FC Barcelona
- FC Barcelona Hoquei, the roller hockey section of FC Barcelona
- FC Barcelona Ice Hockey, the ice hockey section of FC Barcelona
- FC Barcelona Rugby, the rugby section of FC Barcelona
- UB-Barça, the women's basketball section of FC Barcelona

=== Other uses in sports ===
- Barcelona (Tarrafal), a football club in Cape Verde Islands
- Barcelona Dragons (NFL Europe), an American football team in Spain from 1991 to 2003
- Barcelona Dragons (ELF), an American football team in Spain since 2021
- Barcelona Esporte Clube, a football club in Brazil
- Barcelona Sporting Club, a sports club from Guayaquil, Ecuador
- Circuit de Catalunya ("Barcelona"), a motorsport race track in Montmeló, Barcelona, home of Formula One Spanish Grand Prix
- CN Barcelona, a swimming and water polo club from Barcelona, Catalonia
- Real Club de Tenis Barcelona, a private tennis club from Barcelona, Catalonia
- San Felipe Barcelona, a football club in Belize

== Transportation ==
- Barcelona, a cruise ship
- Barcelona Metro, a rapid transit system in Barcelona
- Barcelona–El Prat Airport, an airport in Barcelona, Catalonia
- Rodalies Barcelona, the main commuter and regional rail system in Catalonia

== Science and Technology ==
- Threads (social network), internally codenamed Barcelona before release

== See also ==
- Barcellona Pozzo di Gotto, a city in Sicily, Italy
- Barceloneta (disambiguation), various places
- Barcelonne-du-Gers, a town in Béarn, France
- Barcelonnette, a town in southern France
