= Jacana =

Jacana may refer to:

== Life forms ==
- Jacanidae (or jacanas), a tropical bird family
  - Jacana (genus), endemic to the Americas
- Jácana tree (Pouteria multiflora), endemic to the Americas

== Places ==
=== Australia ===
- Jacana, Victoria, a suburb of Melbourne
  - Jacana railway station

=== Brazil ===
- Jaçanã (district of São Paulo), a suburb
- Jaçanã, Rio Grande do Norte, a municipality

=== Puerto Rico ===
- Jácana, Yauco, Puerto Rico, a barrio in Yauco, a western municipality
- Jácanas, a barrio in Yabucoa, an eastern municipality

== Ships ==
- USS Jacana (AMS-193), an American minesweeper, 1954–1976
