= Microregion of Baixa Verde =

Coordinates: 5°26′38″S 35°49′16″W

Baixa Verde
- Microregion
- Country: Brazil
- State: Rio Grande do Norte
- Mesoregion: Agreste Potiguar

Baixa Verde was a microregion in the Brazilian state of Rio Grande do Norte.

== Municipalities ==
The microregion consisted of the following municipalities:

- Bento Fernandes
- Jandaíra
- João Câmara
- Parazinho
- Poço Branco
