= Japi =

Municipality in Rio Grande do Norte, Brazil

- Municipality
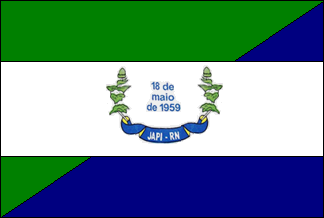
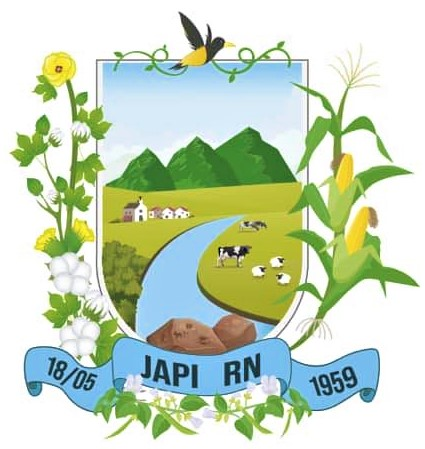
- Flag Coat of arms

- Location in Rio Grande do Norte state

- Location in Brazil
- Coordinates: 6°27′54″S 35°56′49″W
- Country: Brazil
- Region: Northeast
- State: Rio Grande do Norte
- Mesoregion: Agreste Potiguar
- Microregion: Borborema Potiguar

Area
  - Total: 189 km^{2} (73 sq mi)

Population (2020)
  - Total: 4,995
  - Density: 26.4/km^{2} (68.4/sq mi)
- Time zone: UTC−3 (BRT)

Japi is a municipality in the state of Rio Grande do Norte in Brazil. The population is 4,995 (2020 est.) in an area of 189 km^{2}. It is located in the micro region Borborema Potiguar.
