= Rochinha =

Rochinha may refer to:

- Rochinha (politician) (1964–2023), Luís Rocha Filho, Brazilian politician and lawyer
- Rochinha (swimmer) (born 1958), Antônio Carlos Rocha Azevedo, Brazilian swimmer
- Rochinha (tennis player) (born 1984), Diogo Rocha, Portuguese tennis player
- Rochinha (Portuguese footballer) (born 1995), Diogo Filipe Costa Rocha, Portuguese football winger
- Rochinha (Brazilian footballer) (born 1997), José Antonio da Rocha Santos, Brazilian football winger

== See also ==
- Rocinha, favela in Rio de Janeiro, Brazil
