= Santo Antônio, Rio Grande do Norte =

Municipality in Rio Grande do Norte, Brazil

Santo Antônio
- Municipality
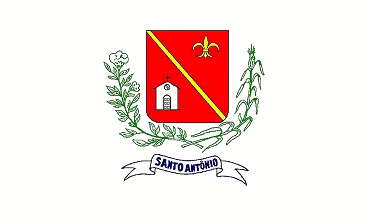
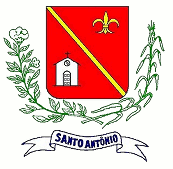
- Flag Coat of arms

- Coordinates: 6.311°S 35.480°W
- Country: Brazil
- Region: Nordeste
- State: Rio Grande do Norte
- Mesoregion: Agreste Potiguar
- Microregion: Agreste Potiguar

Area
  - Total: 301.05 km^{2} (116.24 sq mi)

Population (2020)
  - Total: 24,280
  - Density: 80.65/km^{2} (208.9/sq mi)
- Time zone: UTC−3 (BRT)

Santo Antônio (Portuguese for "Saint Anthony") is a municipality (município) in the state of Rio Grande do Norte in Brazil. The population in 2020 was 24,280 and the area is 301 km^{2}. The elevation is 92 m.
