= Rochinha (Brazilian footballer) =

Brazilian footballer (born 1997)

Personal information
- Full name: José Antonio da Rocha Santos
- Date of birth: 13 November 1997 (age 28)
- Place of birth: Sítio Novo, Brazil
- Height: 1.70 m (5 ft 7 in)
- Position: Forward

Team information
- Current team: Bangu

Youth career
- Barretos

Senior career*
Years	Team	Apps	(Gls)
2018	Barretos	22	(4)
2018	→ Inter de Bebedouro (loan)	19	(2)
2019	Olímpia	13	(1)
2019	→ Inter de Bebedouro (loan)	8	(1)
2020	Osvaldo Cruz	0	(0)
2020	→ Bangu (loan)	11	(0)
2020–	Bangu	32	(5)
2020	→ Água Santa (loan)	0	(0)
2022	→ Santo André (loan)	5	(0)
2022	→ São Bernardo (loan)	2	(0)
2023	→ Portuguesa (loan)	0	(0)
- * Club domestic league appearances and goals as of 22:37, 16 May 2023 (UTC)

José Antonio da Rocha Santos (born 13 November 1997), commonly known as Rochinha, is a Brazilian footballer who plays as a forward for Bangu.

== Club career ==
Born in Sítio Novo, Rio Grande do Norte, Rochinha made his senior debut with Barretos in the 2018 Campeonato Paulista Série A3. He subsequently played for Inter de Bebedouro (two stints) and Olímpia before joining Bangu on 13 January 2020.

On 24 August 2020, Rochinha signed a permanent contract with Bangu, and was regularly used during the 2021 season. On 29 November of that year, he was loaned to Santo André for the 2022 Campeonato Paulista.

On 16 April 2022, Rochinha was announced at Série D side São Bernardo. Rarely used as the club achieved promotion, he returned to Bangu for the 2023 campaign, but appeared in just one match before moving out on loan to Portuguesa on 9 May 2023.

== Career statistics ==
As of 1 November 2023

Club	Season	League			State League		Cup		Continental		Other		Total	
Club	Season	Division	Apps	Goals	Apps	Goals	Apps	Goals	Apps	Goals	Apps	Goals	Apps	Goals
Barretos	2018	Paulista A3	—		22	4	—		—		—		22	4
Inter de Bebedouro (loan)	2018	Paulista 2ª Divisão	—		19	2	—		—		—		19	2
Olímpia	2019	Paulista A3	—		13	1	—		—		—		13	1
Inter de Bebedouro (loan)	2019	Paulista 2ª Divisão	—		8	1	—		—		—		8	1
Bangu	2020	Série D	9	0	11	0	—		—		—		20	0
Bangu	2021	Série D	16	5	6	0	—		—		2 (Note: Appearance(s) in Copa Rio)	0	24	5
Bangu	2023	Carioca	—		1	0	—		—		—		1	0
Bangu	Total		25	5	18	0	—		—		2	0	45	5
Água Santa (loan)	2020	Paulista	—		0	0	—		—		3 (Note: Appearance(s) in Copa Paulista)	1	3	1
Santo André (loan)	2022	Série D	0	0	5	0	—		—		—		5	0
São Bernardo (loan)	2022	Série D	2	0	—		—		—		—		2	0
Portuguesa	2023	Paulista	—		0	0	—		—		4	0	4	0
Career total			27	5	85	8	0	0	0	0	9	1	121	14
