= Caiçara do Rio do Vento =

Municipality in Rio Grande do Norte, Brazil

- Municipality
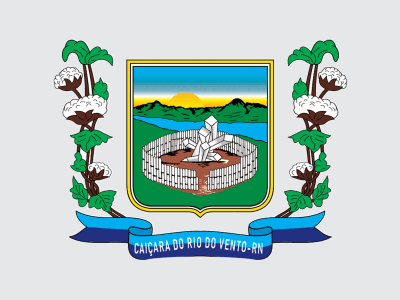
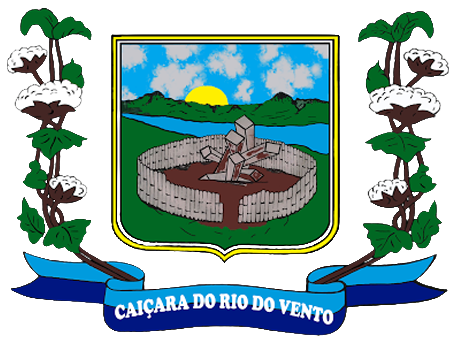
- Flag Coat of arms

- Location in Brazil
- Coordinates: 5°46′S 36°00′W
- Country: Brazil
- Region: Nordeste
- State: Rio Grande do Norte
- Mesoregion: Central Potiguar

Population (2022)
  - Total: 3,268
- Time zone: UTC -3

Caiçara do Rio do Vento is a municipality in the state of Rio Grande do Norte in the Northeast region of Brazil. With an area of 261.194 square kilometers (100.848 sq mi), of which 0.5676 square kilometres (0.2192 sq mi) is urban, it is located 88 km from Natal, the state capital, and 1,713 km from Brasília, the federal capital. Its population in the 2022 demographic census was 3,268 inhabitants, according to the Brazilian Institute of Geography and Statistics (IBGE), ranking as the 145th most populous municipality in the state of Rio Grande do Norte.

== Geography ==
The territory of Caiçara do Rio do Vento covers 261.194 square kilometers (100.848 sq mi), of which 0.5676 square kilometres (0.2192 sq mi) constitutes the urban area. It sits at an average altitude of 167 meters above sea level. Caiçara do Rio do Vento borders these municipalities: to the north, Jardim de Angicos, Pedra Preta and Lajes; to the south, Ruy Barbosa e São Tomé; to the east, Macaíba; and to the west, Lajes. The city is located 88 km from the state capital Natal, and 1,713 km from the federal capital Brasília.

Under the territorial division established in 2017 by the Brazilian Institute of Geography and Statistics (IBGE), the municipality belongs to the immediate geographical region of São Paulo do Potengi, within the intermediate region of Natal. Previously, under the microregion and mesoregion divisions, it was part of the microregion of Angicos in the mesoregion of Central Potiguar.

== Demographics ==
In the 2022 census, the municipality had a population of 3,268 inhabitants and ranked 145th in the state that year (out of 167 municipalities), with 50.28% male and 49.72% female, resulting in a sex ratio of 101.11 (10,111 men for every 10,000 women), compared to 3,308 inhabitants in the 2010 census (76,36% living in the urban area), when it held the 147th state position. Between the 2010 and 2022 censuses, the population of Caiçara do Rio do Vento changed at an annual geometric growth rate of -0.1%. Regarding age group in the 2022 census, 66.54% of the inhabitants were between 15 and 64 years old, 21.7% were under fifteen, and 11.78% were 65 or older. The population density in 2022 was 12.51 inhabitants per square kilometer. There were 1,050 housing units with an average of 3.11 inhabitants per household.

The municipality's Human Development Index (HDI-M) was considered medium, according to data from the United Nations Development Programme (UNDP). According to the 2010 report published in 2013, its value was 0.587, ranking 123rd in the state and 4,467th nationally (out of 5,565 municipalities), and the Gini coefficient rose from 0.35 in 2003 to 0.5 in 2010. Considering only the longevity index, its value is 0.734, the income index is 0.553, and the education index is 0.499.

== See also ==
- List of municipalities in Rio Grande do Norte
