= Barceloneta =

Barceloneta may refer to:

- Barceloneta, Puerto Rico, municipality in Puerto Rico
- Barceloneta, Barcelona, beach and a neighborhood in the Ciutat Vella district of Barcelona, Spain
  - Barceloneta (Barcelona Metro)
- Barceloneta, the old nickname of the city of Alghero, Sardinia

See also

- Barcelonnette, a town in France
