= Caiçara viola =

Brazilian type of guitar

The Caiçara viola is a Brazilian guitar-like plucked stringed instrument originating from the coasts of São Paulo and Paraná, areas of development of Caiçara culture. It has between 5 and 8 strings, with one string being a short string which goes to a peg at the body-neck join or half-way on the neck, like a banjo. It is otherwise built much like a Caipira viola, with the strings attached to a fixed bridge on the soundboard, then going over a small floating bridge. It usually has wooden pegs for tuning.
