= São Pedro, Rio Grande do Norte =

Municipality in Rio Grande do Norte, Brazil

Coordinates: 5°53′52″S 35°38′02″W

- Municipality
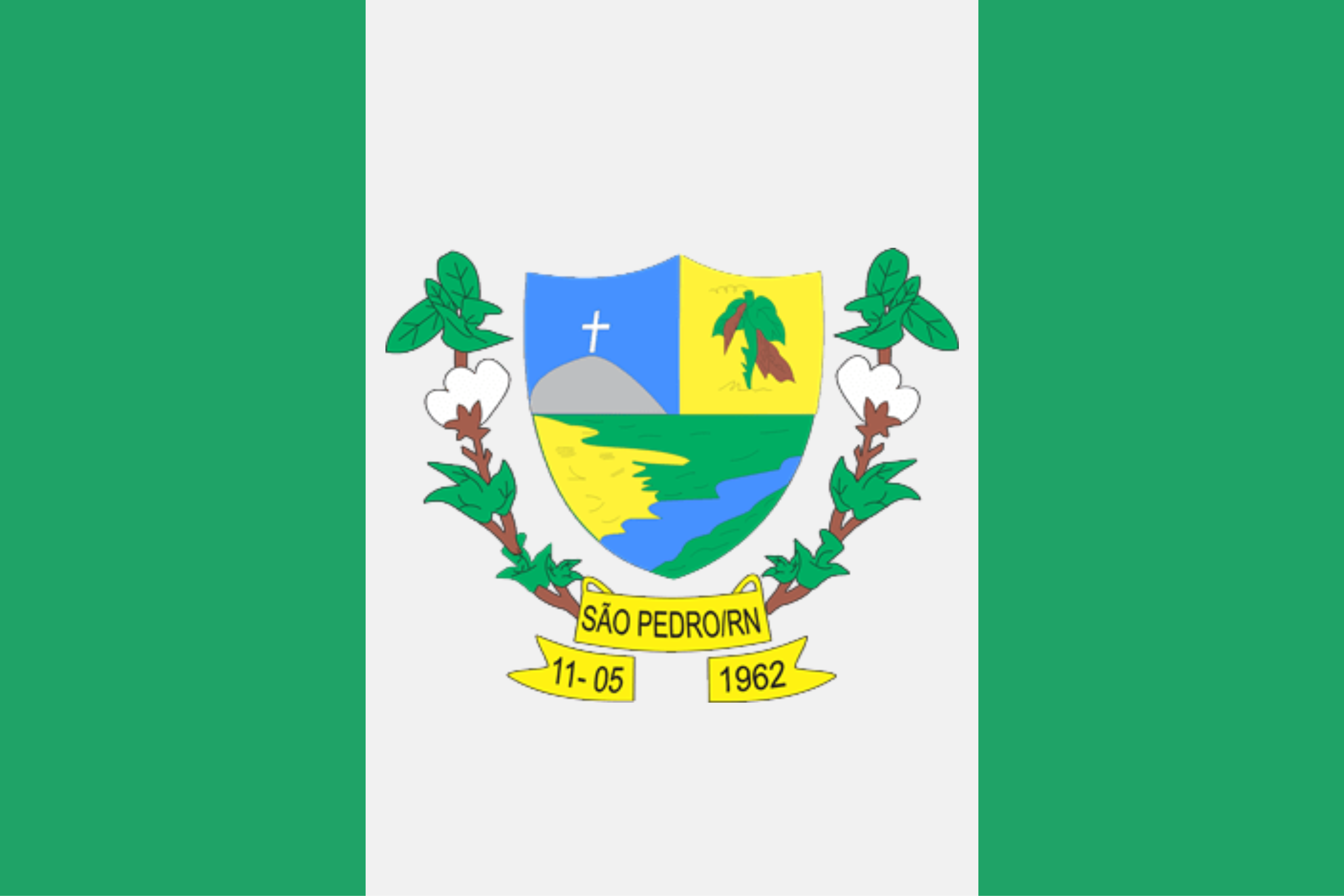
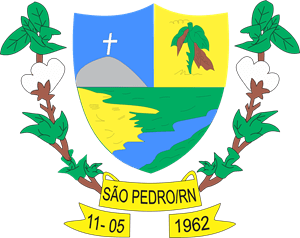
- Flag Coat of arms

- Location of São Pedro.
- Country: Brazil
- Region: Nordeste
- State: Rio Grande do Norte
- Mesoregion: Agreste Potiguar

Population (2020)
  - Total: 5,930
- Time zone: UTC−3 (BRT)

São Pedro is a municipality in the state of Rio Grande do Norte in the Northeast region of Brazil.

== See also ==
- List of municipalities in Rio Grande do Norte
