= Caiçara, Rio Grande do Sul =

Municipality in Rio Grande do Sul, Brazil

Coordinates: 27°16′26″S 53°25′55″W

Caiçara
- Municipality
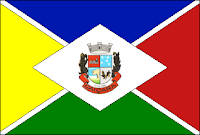
- Flag Coat of arms

- Location in Rio Grande do Sul
- Country: Brazil
- State: Rio Grande do Sul

Population (2020)
  - Total: 4,700
- Time zone: UTC−3 (BRT)

Caiçara is a municipality in the state of Rio Grande do Sul, Brazil.

== See also ==
- List of municipalities in Rio Grande do Sul
