= Vera Cruz, Rio Grande do Norte =

Municipality in Rio Grande do Norte, Brazil

Coordinates: 6°02′38″S 35°25′40″W

- Municipality
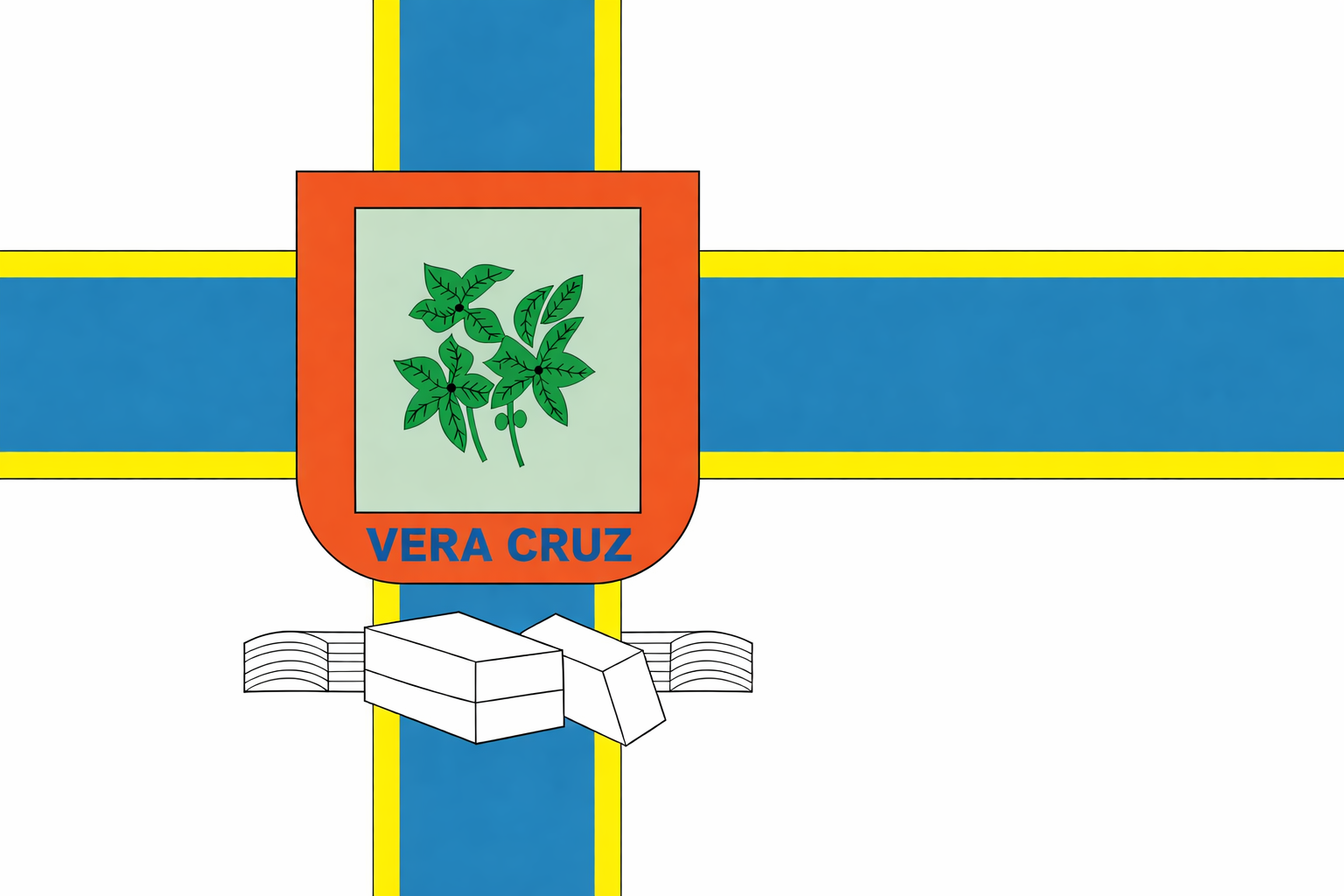
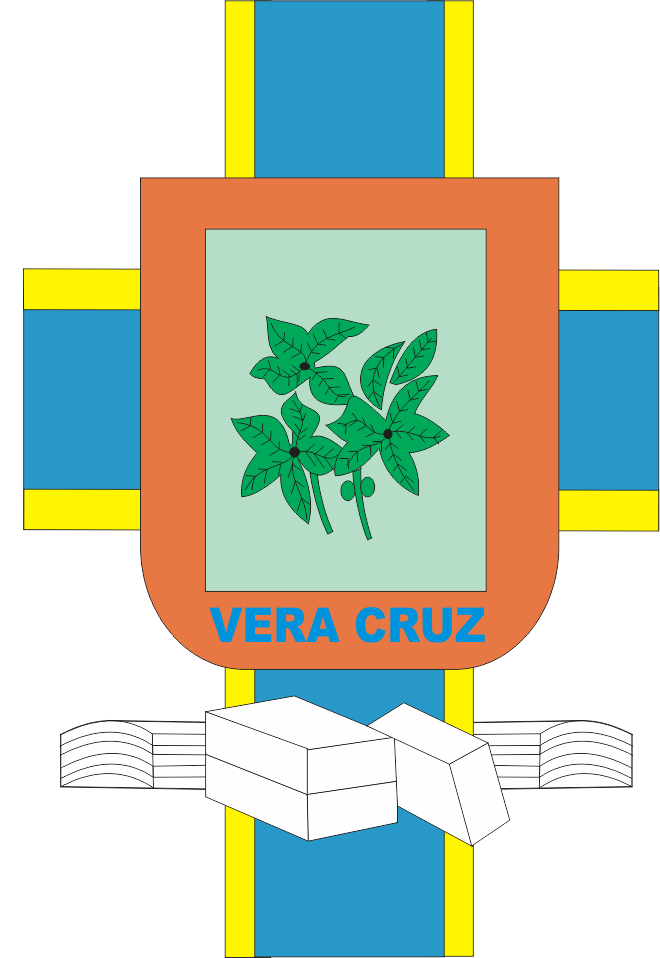
- Flag Coat of arms
- Interactive map of Vera Cruz, Rio Grande do Norte
- Country: Brazil
- Region: Nordeste
- State: Rio Grande do Norte
- Mesoregion: Agreste Potiguar

Population (2020)
  - Total: 12,637
- Time zone: UTC−3 (BRT)

Vera Cruz is a municipality in the state of Rio Grande do Norte in the Northeast region of Brazil.

== See also ==
- List of municipalities in Rio Grande do Norte
