= São Paulo do Potengi =

Municipality in Rio Grande do Norte, Brazil

Coordinates: 5°55′S 35°45′W

- The Municipality of São Paulo do Potengi
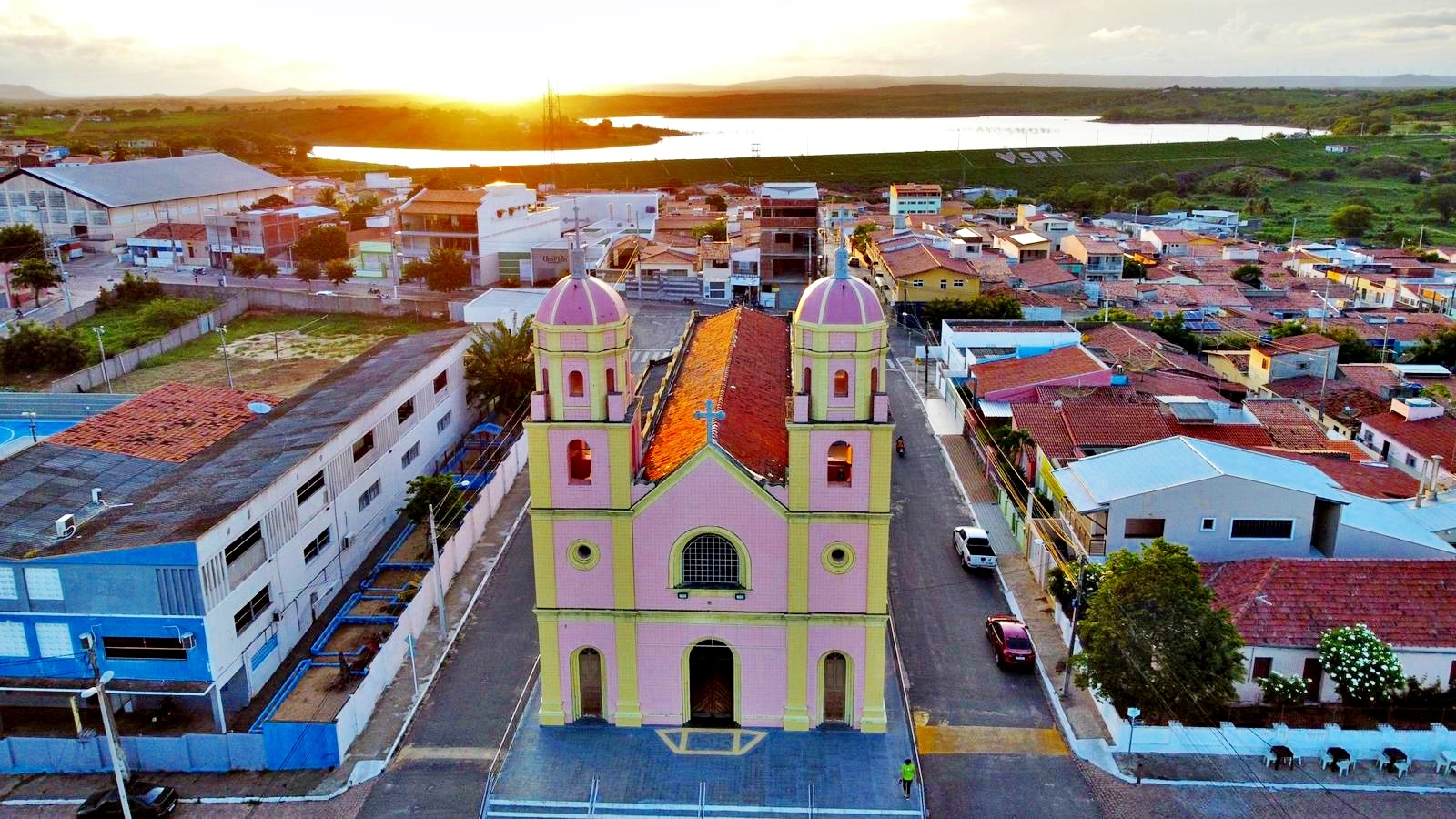
- São Paulo do Potengi Cathedral

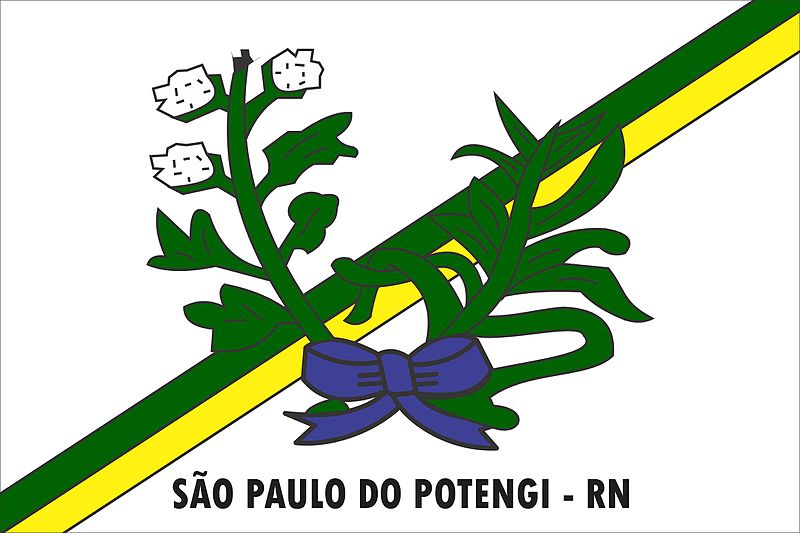
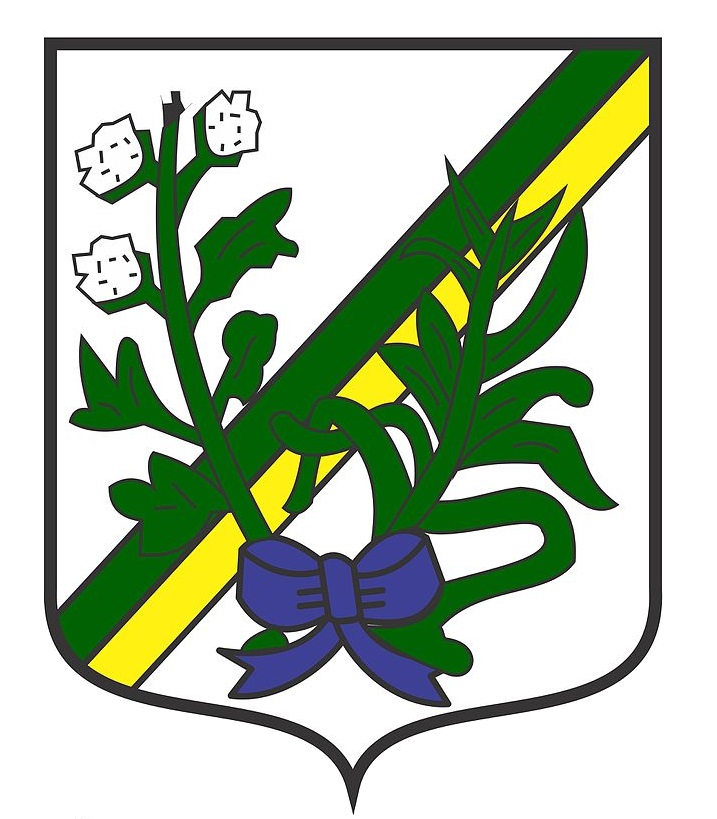
- Flag Coat of arms
- Interactive map of São Paulo do Potengi
- Country: Brazil
- Region: Nordeste
- State: Rio Grande do Norte
- Mesoregion: Agreste Potiguar

Population (2020)
  - Total: 17,720
- Time zone: UTC−3 (BRT)

São Paulo do Potengi is a municipality in the state of Rio Grande do Norte in the Northeast region of Brazil.

== See also ==
- List of municipalities in Rio Grande do Norte
