= Lagoa Salgada =

Municipality in Rio Grande do Norte, Brazil

Coordinates: 6°07′S 35°29′W

- Municipality
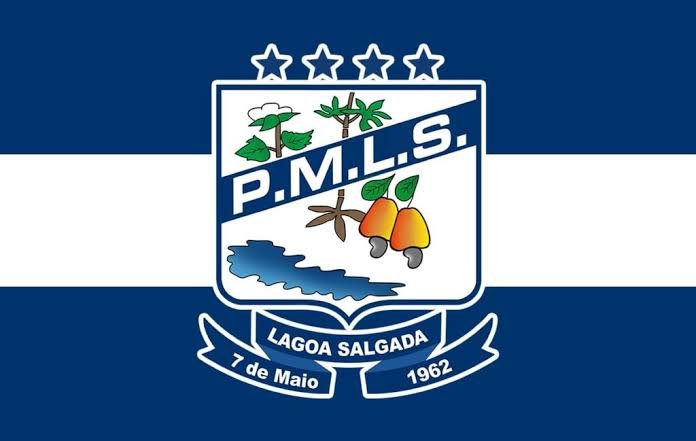
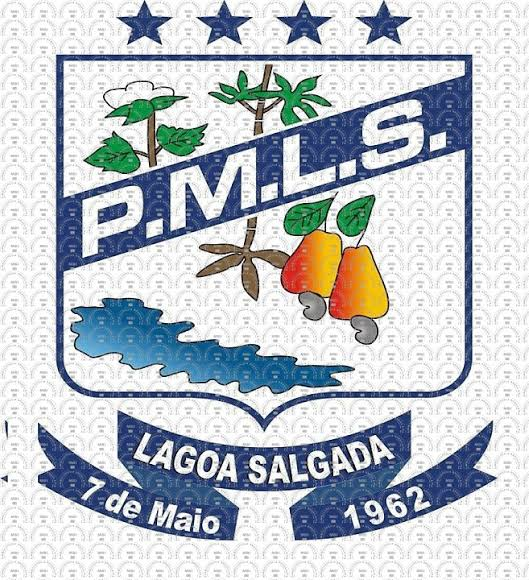
- Flag Coat of arms
- Interactive map of Lagoa Salgada
- Country: Brazil
- Region: Nordeste
- State: Rio Grande do Norte
- Mesoregion: Agreste Potiguar

Population (2020)
  - Total: 8,297
- Time zone: UTC−3 (BRT)

Lagoa Salgada is a municipality in the state of Rio Grande do Norte in the Northeast region of Brazil.

Lagoa Salgada is also a salty lake in the north of the same state, in which are found stromatolite formations that provide ancient records of some kind of layered rock structure that is formed above water at 21°54'10"S 41°00'30"W.

== See also ==
- List of municipalities in Rio Grande do Norte
