= São Bento do Trairi =

Municipality in Rio Grande do Norte, Brazil

Coordinates: 6°20′S 36°05′W

- Municipality
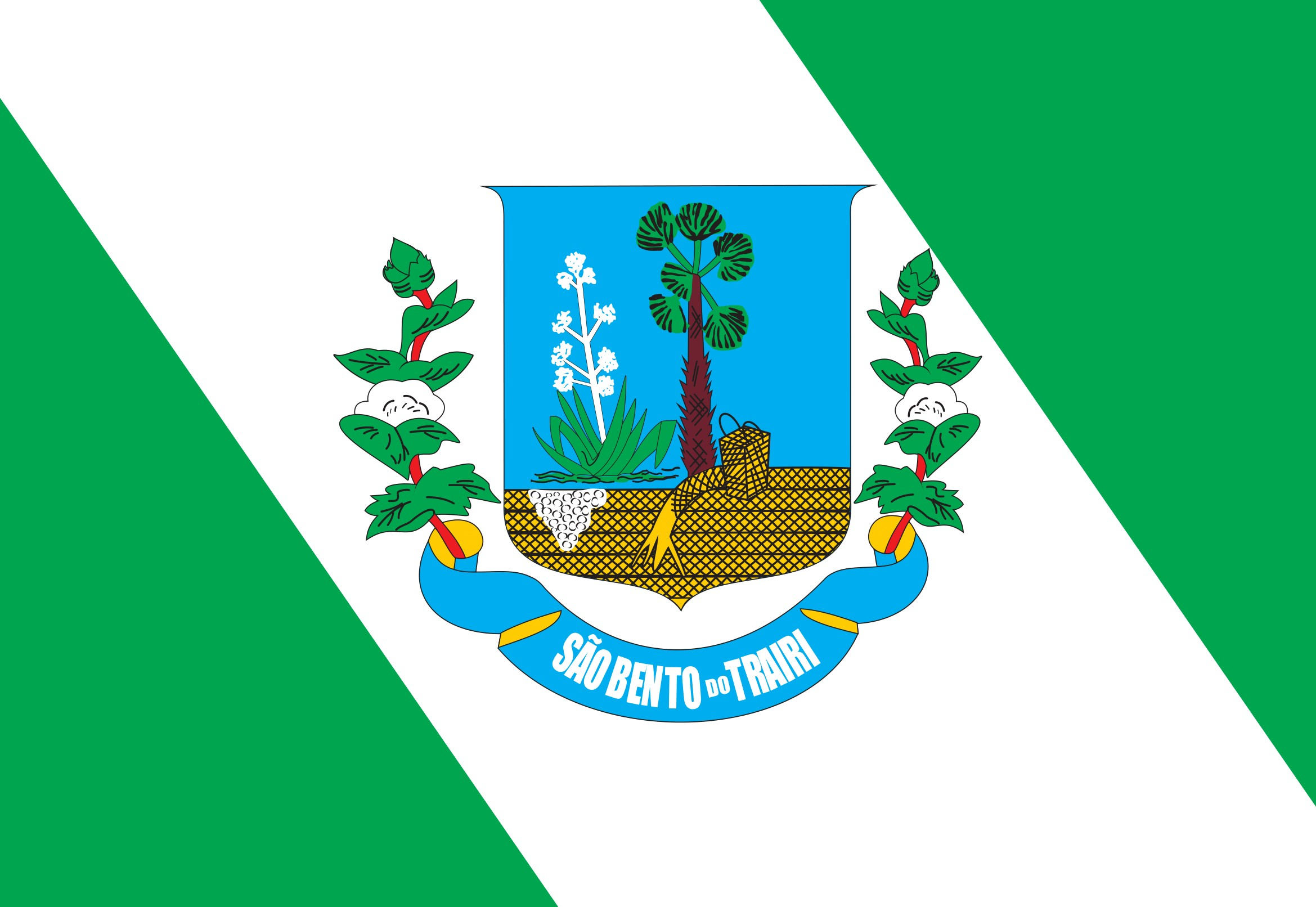
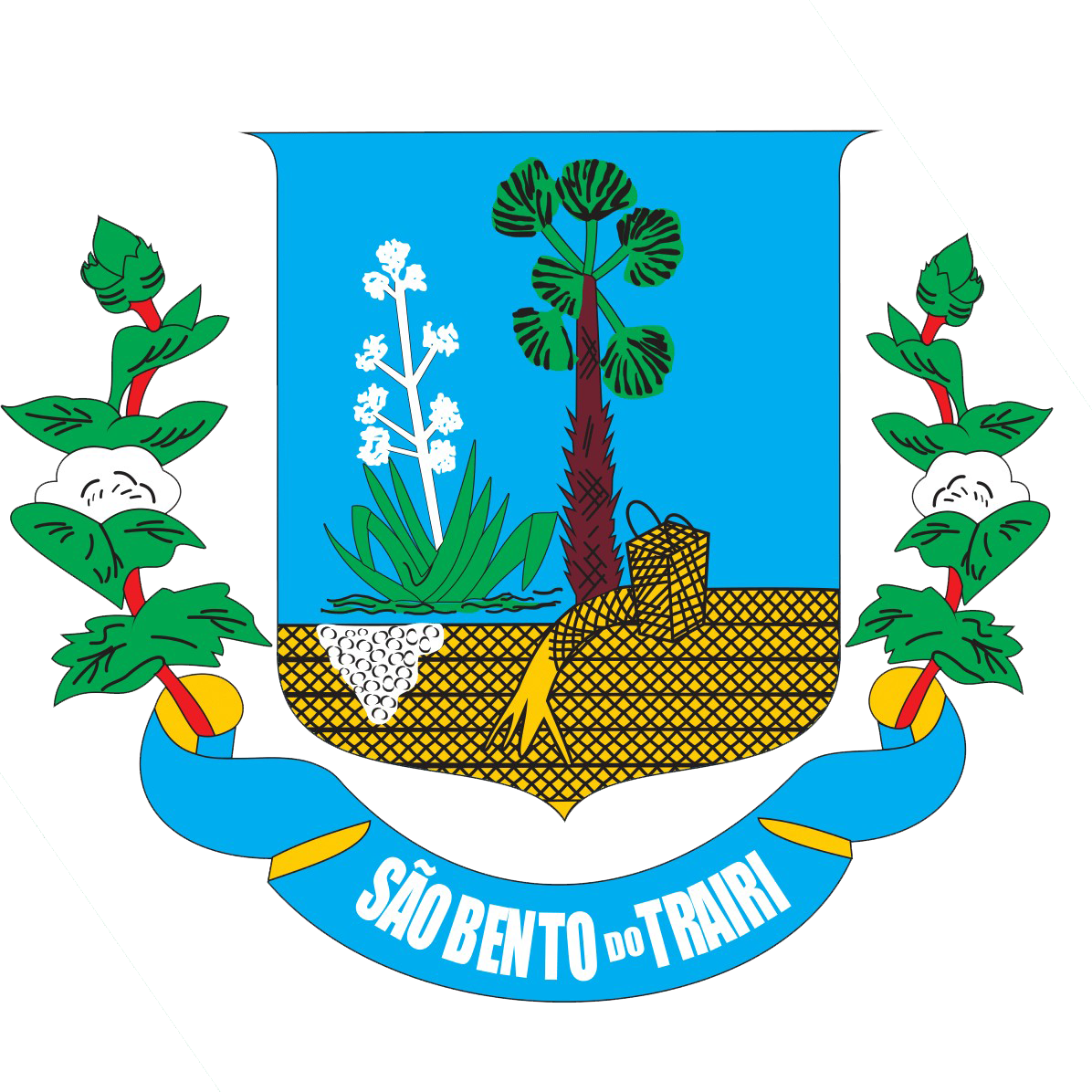
- Flag Coat of arms
- Interactive map of São Bento do Trairi
- Country: Brazil
- Region: Nordeste
- State: Rio Grande do Norte
- Mesoregion: Agreste Potiguar

Population (2020)
  - Total: 4,495
- Time zone: UTC−3 (BRT)

São Bento do Trairi is a municipality in the state of Rio Grande do Norte in the Northeast region of Brazil.

== See also ==
- List of municipalities in Rio Grande do Norte
