= Lagoa de Velhos =

Municipality in Rio Grande do Norte, Brazil

Coordinates: 6.00389°S 35.8719°W

- Municipality
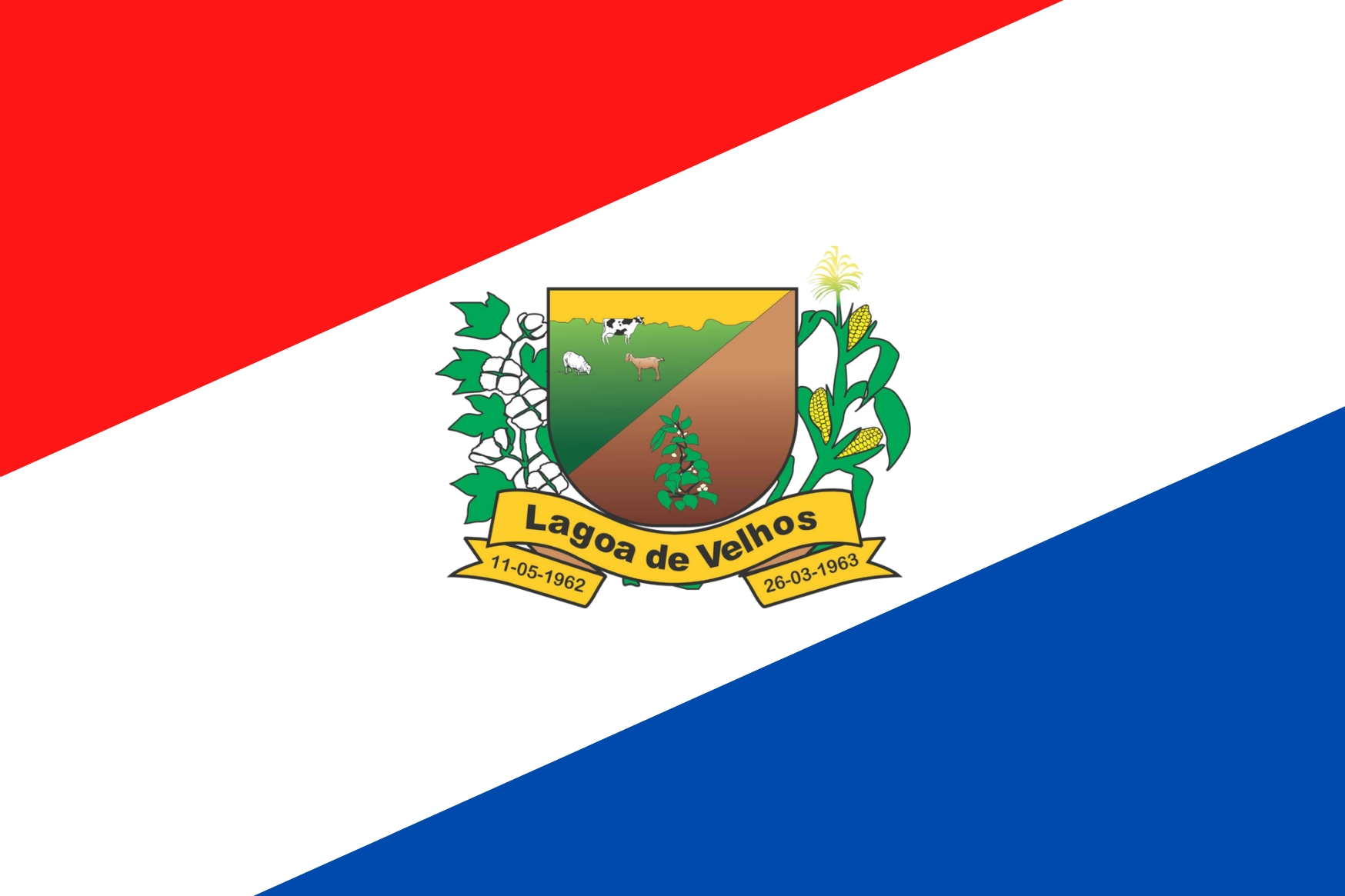
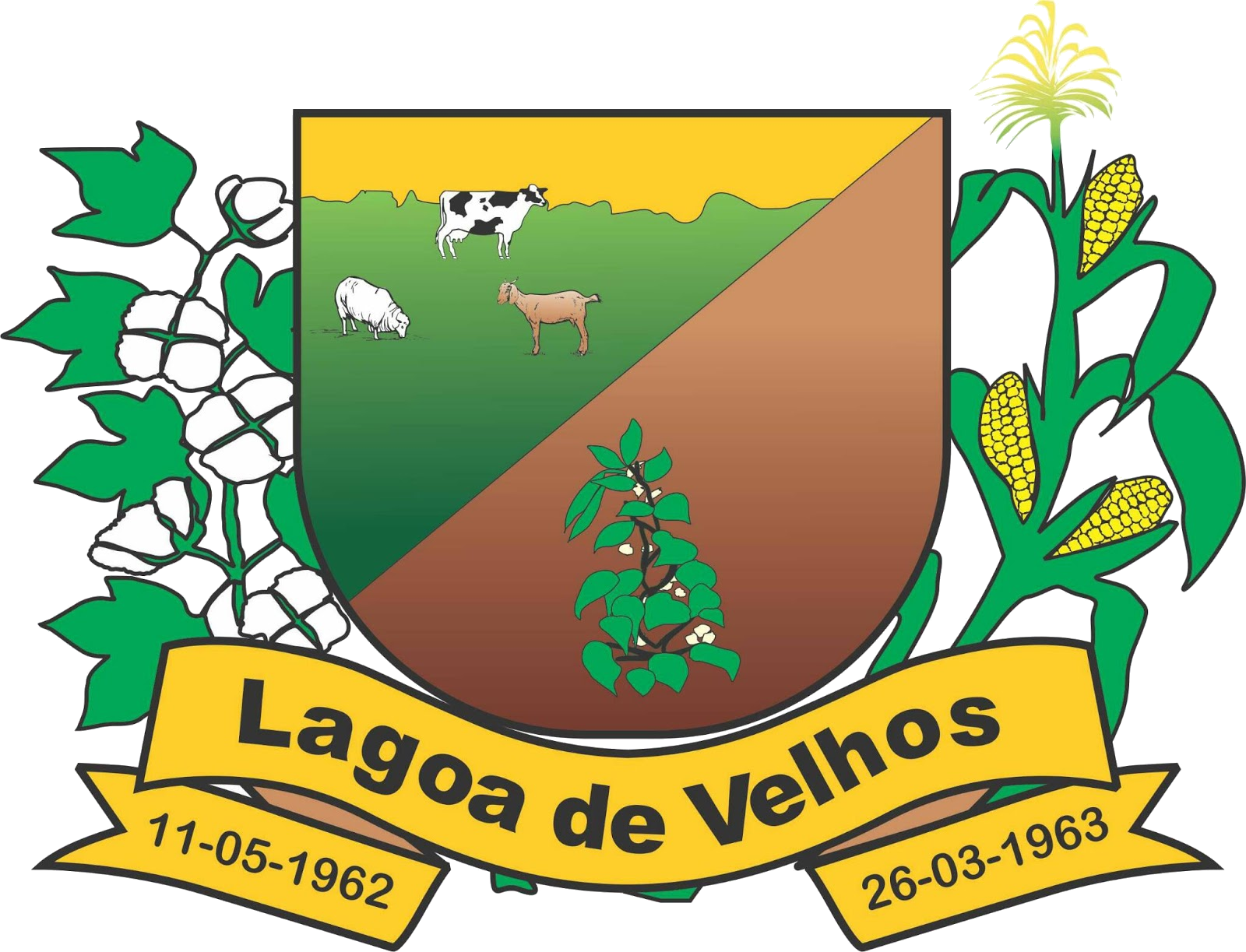
- Flag Coat of arms
- Interactive map of Lagoa de Velhos
- Country: Brazil
- Region: Nordeste
- State: Rio Grande do Norte
- Mesoregion: Agreste Potiguar

Population (2020)
  - Total: 2,732
- Time zone: UTC−3 (BRT)

Lagoa de Velhos is a municipality in the state of Rio Grande do Norte in the Northeast region of Brazil.

== See also ==
- List of municipalities in Rio Grande do Norte
