= Senador Elói de Souza =

Municipality in Rio Grande do Norte, Brazil

Coordinates: 6.03583°S 35.6928°W

- Municipality
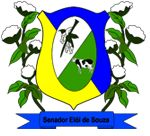
- Flag Coat of arms
- Interactive map of Senador Elói de Souza
- Country: Brazil
- Region: Nordeste
- State: Rio Grande do Norte
- Mesoregion: Agreste Potiguar

Population (2020)
  - Total: 6,127
- Time zone: UTC−3 (BRT)

Senador Elói de Souza is a municipality in the state of Rio Grande do Norte in the Northeast region of Brazil.

== See also ==
- List of municipalities in Rio Grande do Norte
