= Agreste Potiguar (mesoregion) =

Coordinates: 6.106°S 35.982°W

- Mesoregion
- Country: Brazil
- State: Rio Grande do Norte

Agreste Potiguar was a mesoregion in the Brazilian state of Rio Grande do Norte.

== Microregions ==
- Agreste Potiguar
- Baixa Verde
- Borborema Potiguar
