= Microregion of Litoral Sul, Rio Grande do Norte =

Coordinates: 6°22′48″S 35°07′44″W

Litoral Sul
- Microregion
- Country: Brazil
- State: Rio Grande do Norte
- Mesoregion: Leste Potiguar

Litoral Sul was a microregion in the Brazilian state of Rio Grande do Norte.

== Municipalities ==
The microregion consisted of the following municipalities:

- Arês
- Baía Formosa
- Canguaretama
- Espírito Santo
- Goianinha
- Montanhas
- Pedro Velho
- Senador Georgino Avelino
- Tibau do Sul
- Vila Flor
