= Our Lady of Solitude Cemetery =

Urban park in Pará, Brazil

Coordinates: 01°27′28″S 48°29′25″W

- Cemitério de Nossa Senhora da Soledade
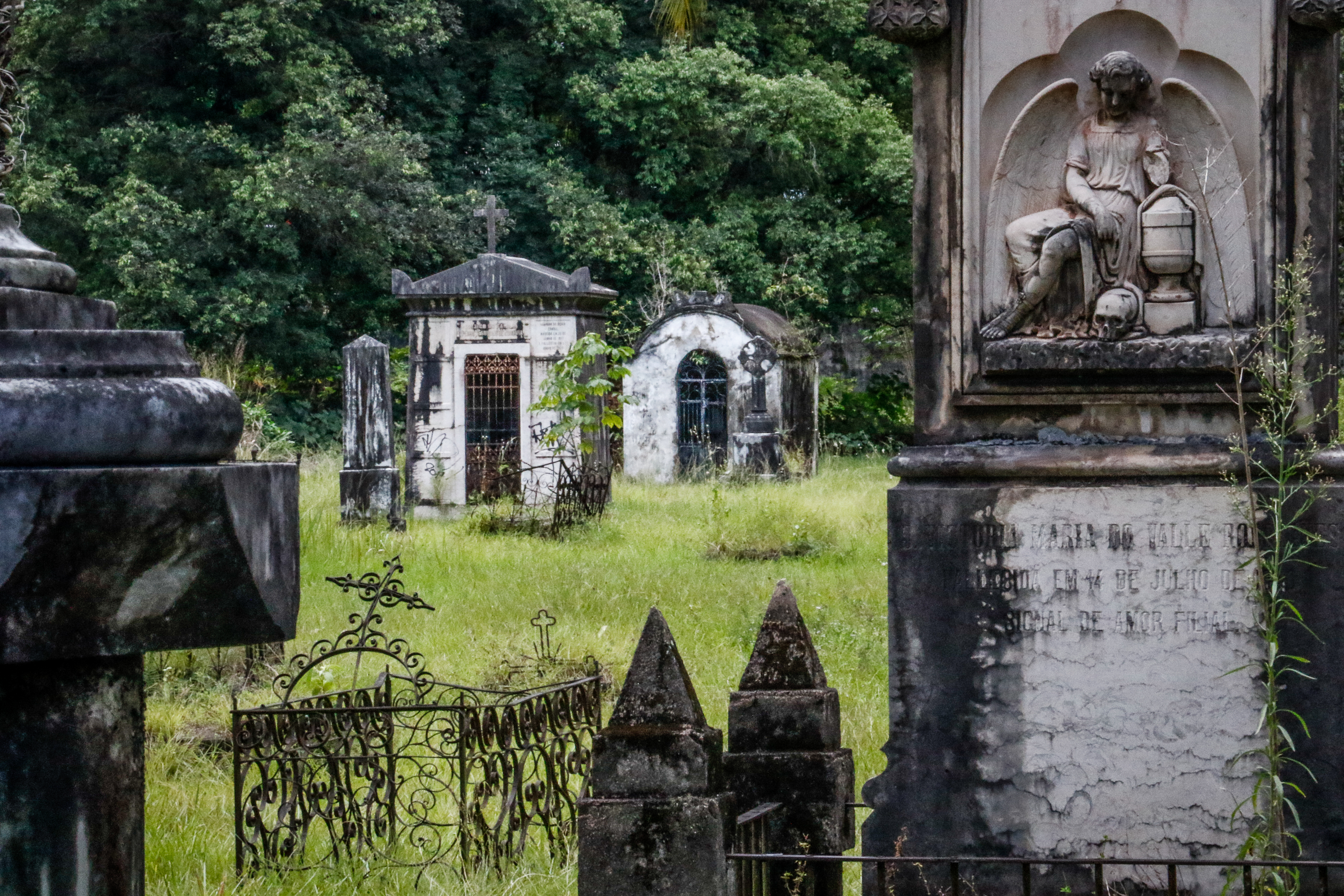
- View of Our Lady of Solitude Cemetery, Belém, Pará, Brazil.

- Location of Our Lady of Solitude Cemetery in Brazil.

Religion
- Affiliation: Catholic
- Rite: Roman

Location
- Municipality: Belém
- State: Pará
- Country: Brazil
- Interactive map of Our Lady of Solitude Cemetery

Architecture
- Type: Neoclassical architecture
- Established: 1850
- Site area: 76,340 m²

National Historic Heritage of Brazil
- Designated: 1964
- Reference no.: 376

Our Lady of Solitude Cemetery (Portuguese: Cemitério de Nossa Senhora da Soledade) is a former cemetery and, nowadays, an urban park in Brazil, originally established as a public necropolis in 1850 by Captain Joaquim Vitorino de Sousa Cabral in the Batista Campos neighborhood of Belém, Pará. It was created in response to the epidemics that affected the city during the 19th century. The site was listed as architectural heritage in 1964. In 2023, it was converted into an urban park, museum, and cultural space.

The number of burials at the site exceeds thirty thousand, largely due to the yellow fever epidemic of 1850 and the cholera epidemic of 1885.

== History ==
In the mid-19th century, a yellow fever epidemic struck the city of Belém, necessitating the construction of a new cemetery. At the time, the existing Cemetery of Peace in Campina Square was primarily used for slaves and the indigent, while the elite continued to be clandestinely buried in churches. In January 1850, a new cemetery was inaugurated in the Batista Campos neighborhood, covering an area of 76,340 m^{2}. The site featured a neoclassical chapel dedicated to Our Lady of Solitude, built by Joaquim Vitorino de Sousa Cabral.

Despite its establishment, the necropolis faced several issues. It was located in the middle of the city, occupied a relatively small area, and suffered from hygiene problems. This was in contrast to the imperial law of 1828, which mandated the "hygienization of death" through the construction of cemeteries away from urban centers. In December 1850, the administration of the cemetery was transferred to the Santa Casa de Misericórdia, which undertook completion and improvement works that were finalized in 1854.

In 1863, the cemetery underwent significant modifications: the casuarina grove was removed, the wooden railings were replaced with concave brick parapets, and the chapel was refurbished and whitewashed.

The construction of the necropolis marked a transitional period in Pará's history. At the time, only the poor and enslaved individuals were buried in cemeteries, such as the slave burial ground in what is now República Square, which lacked boundaries and chapels. Meanwhile, the wealthy continued to be buried near churches. This led to significant resistance from the upper classes regarding the use of cemeteries. To address this, a municipal necropolis model was developed, inspired by European designs, featuring a chapel and a defined space. This approach aimed to convince and encourage the wealthier segments of society to accept and utilize the new cemetery.

In 1880, burials at the cemetery were discontinued, but it remained open for visitation. It was particularly popular among relatives of those interred there and on the Day of the Souls, traditionally observed on Mondays. Among the notable funerary monuments is the tomb of General Hilário Maximiliano Antunes Gurjão, constructed in Brescia and featuring a sculpture by Antonio Allegretti, a professor at the Institute of Fine Arts in Rome. General Hilário Gurjão was among those buried in the cemetery.

== Architecture ==
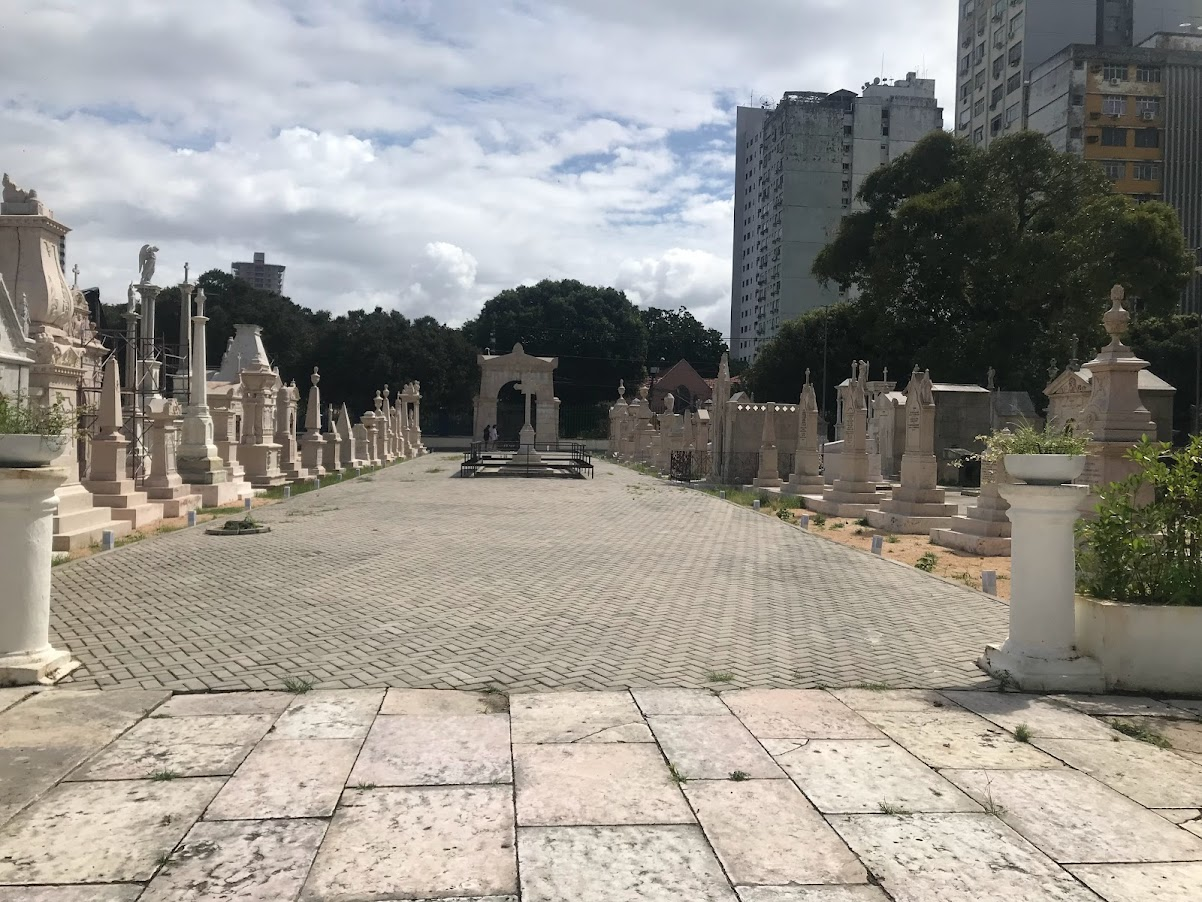
Solitude Cemetery Park with restored architecture.

The chapel was constructed in the neoclassical style, featuring a sawn bell tower, a wide arch at the rear, and oval Baroque-Pombaline elements set on a classical base. The portico and entrance gate, designed by the French architect Pierre-Joseph Pézerat (1801 — 1872), known in Brazil and Portugal as Pedro José Pézerat, were crafted from lias stone, meticulously hewn and chiseled. The iron railing was imported from England.

== Philatelic tribute ==
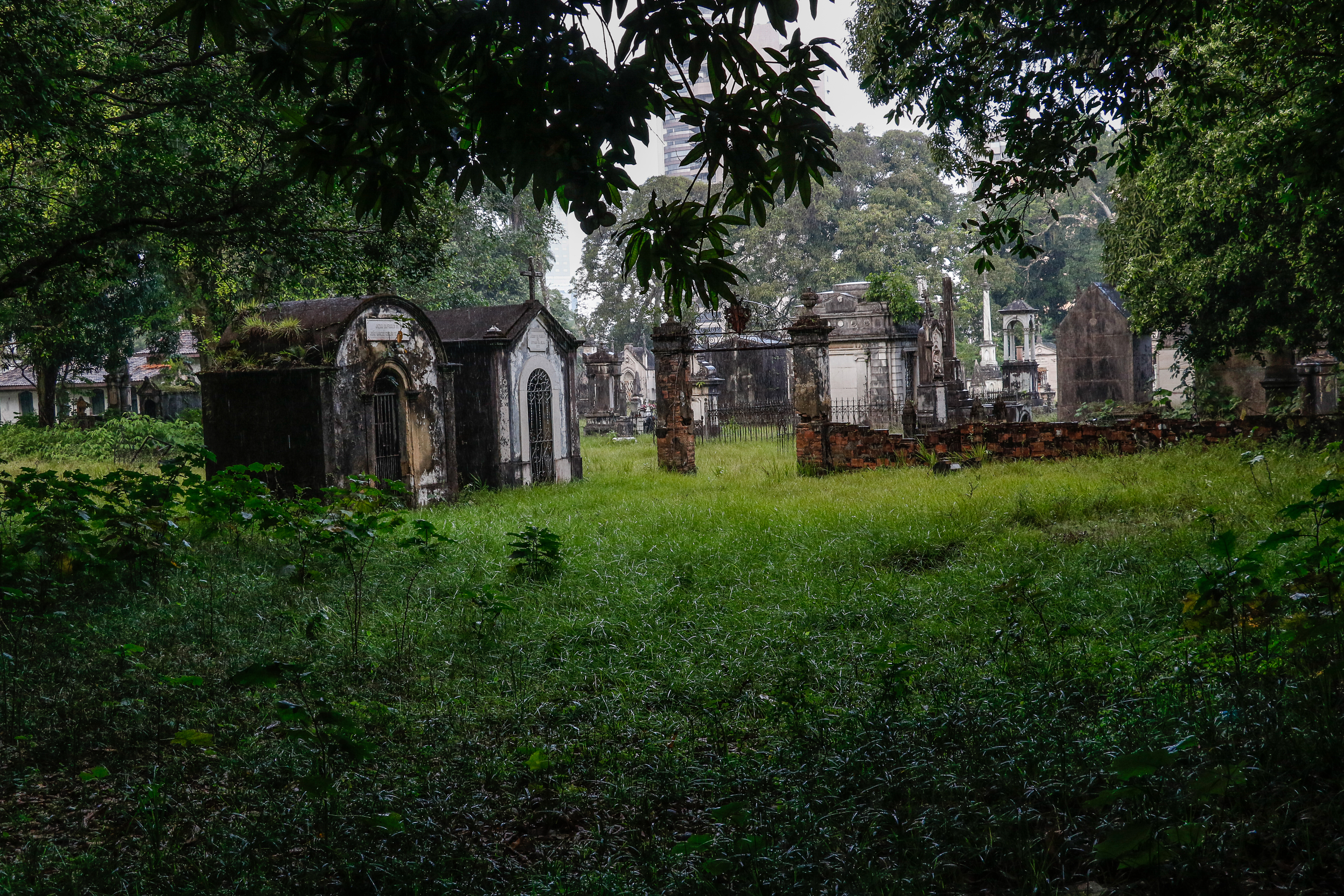
General view of Solitude Cemetery before restoration.

In 2013, the Empresa Brasileira de Correios e Telégrafos (Correios) issued commemorative postage stamps celebrating four Brazilian cemeteries listed as federal heritage sites by the National Institute of Historic and Artistic Heritage (IPHAN). Alongside the Our Lady of Solutide Cemetery, the honored cemeteries included the Arês Cemetery (Arês, Rio Grande do Norte), the Santa Isabel Cemetery (Mucugê, Bahia), and the Batalhão Cemetery (Campo Maior, Piauí).

== Historical heritage ==
This public necropolis was designated as an architectural, urban, and landscape heritage site by the National Historical and Artistic Heritage Institute (IPHAN) in 1964.

== See also ==
- Batalhão Cemetery
