= Canguaretama =

Municipality in Rio Grande do Norte, Brazil

- Municipality
- Municipality of Canguaretama
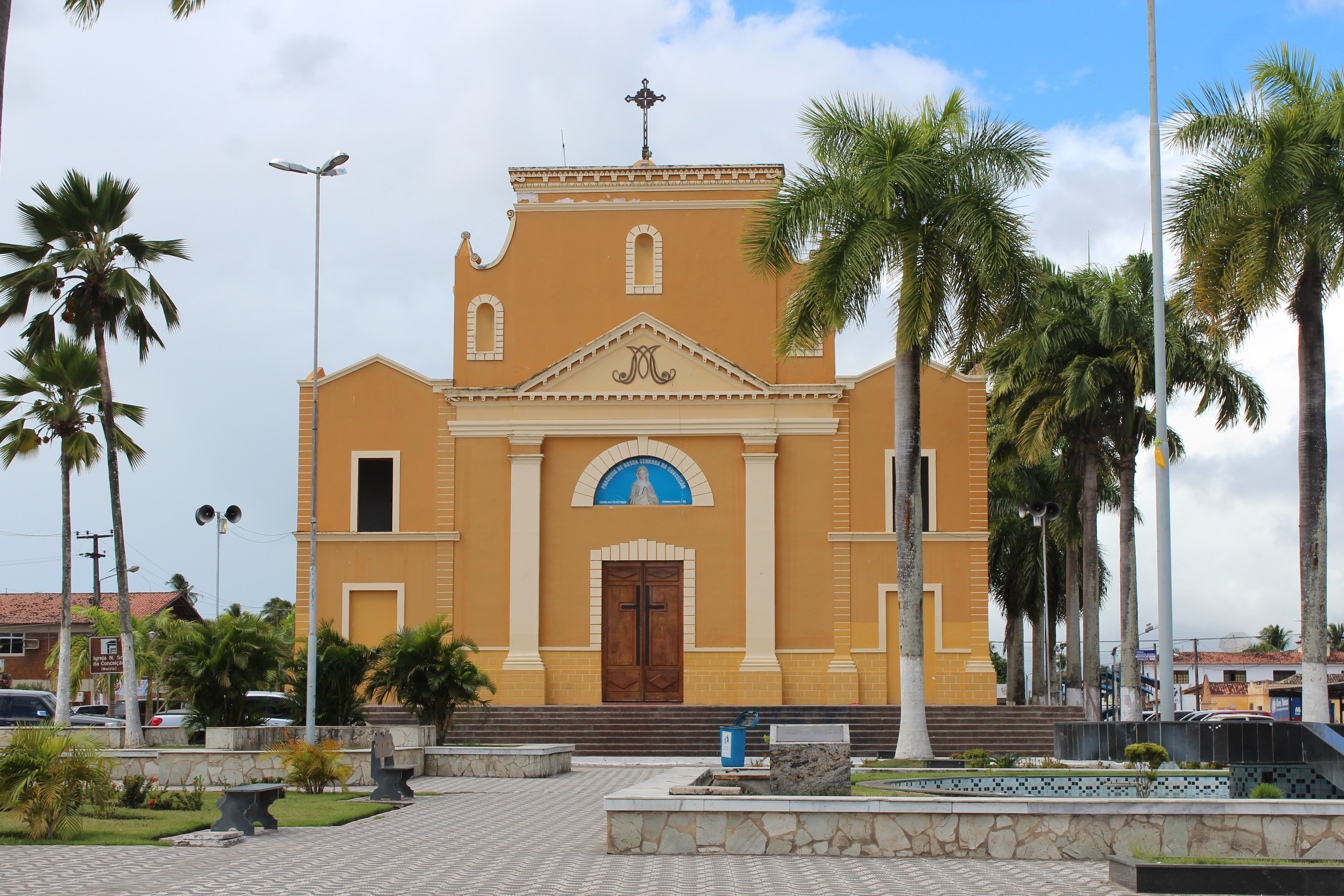

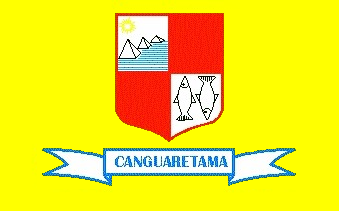
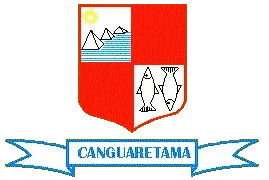
- Flag Coat of arms

- Location in Brazil
- Coordinates: 6°23′S 35°08′W
- Country: Brazil
- Region: Nordeste
- State: Rio Grande do Norte
- Mesoregion: Leste Potiguar

Population (2022)
  - Total: 29,668
- Time zone: UTC−3 (BRT)

Canguaretama is a municipality in the state of Rio Grande do Norte in the Northeast region of Brazil. With an area of 245.485 square kilometers (94.782 sq mi), of which 6.6117 square kilometres (2.5528 sq mi) is urban, it is located 65 km from Natal, the state capital, and 1,746 km from Brasília, the federal capital. Its population in the 2022 demographic census was 29,668 inhabitants, according to the Brazilian Institute of Geography and Statistics (IBGE), ranking as the 19th most populous municipality in the state of Rio Grande do Norte.

== Geography ==
The territory of Canguaretama covers 245.485 square kilometers (94.782 sq mi), of which 6.6117 square kilometres (2.5528 sq mi) constitutes the urban area. It sits at an average altitude of 5 meters above sea level. Canguaretama borders these municipalities: to the north, Tibau do Sul and Goianinha; to the south, Pedro Velho, Baía Formosa, and Mataraca from the state of Paraíba; to the east, Vila Flor and Baía Formosa; and to the west, Espírito Santo and Pedro Velho. The city is located 65 km from the state capital Natal, and 1,746 km from the federal capital Brasília.

Under the territorial division established in 2017 by the Brazilian Institute of Geography and Statistics (IBGE), the municipality belongs to the immediate geographical region of Canguaretama, within the intermediate region of Natal. Previously, under the microregion and mesoregion divisions, it was part of the microregion of Litoral Sul in the mesoregion of Leste Potiguar.

== Demographics ==
In the 2022 census, the municipality had a population of 29,668 inhabitants and ranked 19th in the state that year (out of 167 municipalities), with 51.09% female and 48.91% male, resulting in a sex ratio of 95.73 (9,573 men for every 10,000 women), compared to 30,916 inhabitants in the 2010 census (65.45% living in the urban area), when it held the 16th state position. Between the 2010 and 2022 censuses, the population of Canguaretama changed at an annual geometric growth rate of -0.34%. Regarding age group in the 2022 census, 67.51% of the inhabitants were between 15 and 64 years old, 24.2% were under fifteen, and 8.3% were 65 or older. The population density in 2022 was 120.85 inhabitants per square kilometer. There were 9,169 housing units with an average of 3.23 inhabitants per household.

The municipality's Human Development Index (HDI-M) was considered low, according to data from the United Nations Development Programme (UNDP). According to the 2010 report published in 2013, its value was 0.579, ranking 138th in the state and 4,654th nationally (out of 5,565 municipalities), and the Gini coefficient rose from 0.4 in 2003 to 0.5 in 2010. Considering only the longevity index, its value is 0.718, the income index is 0.557, and the education index is 0.486.

== See also ==
- List of municipalities in Rio Grande do Norte
