= Adolfo Gordo =

Brazilian politician

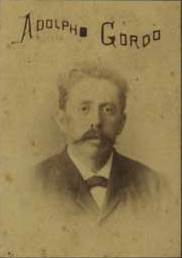
Adolfo Gordo.

Adolfo Gordo (12 August 1858 – 29 June 1929) was a Brazilian politician and businessman. He is noted for formulating the Gordo Laws, which expelled foreign-born labor activists in Brazil. Gordo was also the brother-in-law of Prudente de Morais, the first civilian president of Brazil.

== Biography ==
Gordo was born in Piracicaba, São Paulo, on 12 August 1858. He was the son of Antonio Jose da Silva and Ana Blandina de Barros. His father was a farmer, a councilor of Limeira, and a lieutenant colonel of the National Guard. Antonio died when Gordo was ten years old. Gordo attended Colegio São Luís, in Itu, and at the Santista Institute, run by Augusto Freire in Santos. He then studied law at São Paulo Law School, which was then considered to be a breeding ground of liberal ideology. He began his law practice in Capivari, a city near Piracicaba, Gordo also served as the councilor of the Capivari. He then moved his office to São Paulo, where he practiced with Antonio Mercado, who would also become a fellow republican politician.

Gordo was first married to Ana Pereira de Campos Vergueiro, a granddaughter of another notable politician, Senator Nicolau Vergueiro. He later married Albertina Vieira de Carvalho.

== Political career ==
Gordo was deeply involved in the republican movement in Brazil. He spoke at lectures and rallies and represented Jaboticabal in Congress in 1885, 1887 to 1889, when he also served as the Republican Party secretary. In 1902, it was recorded that Gordo replaced Pedro Velho as the president of the province of Rio Grande do Norte a few days after the latter was elected into the position. Some of his noted accomplishments included the establishment of a normal school and his rewards for those who successfully perfected salt production. The school itself was built in Gordo's name and served students from the municipalities of Paraisopolis, Campo Limpo, Taboao de Serra, Itapecerica da Serra, and Embu.

Gordo was elected to the National Assembly in 1890, the year when Brazil's first republican constitution was drafted. He remained as a deputy in the Assembly until 1902. In 1913, Gordo was elected to fill the Senate seat vacated by the death of ex-President Campos Salles who was then serving as a senator.

=== Legislations ===
Gordo became notorious for sponsoring the Gordo Laws, which became the legal basis for deporting foreign-born leaders. It was initially created to intimidate the workers’ movement that emerged in the neighborhoods of Bras and Mooca. It is believed to be a response to the growing influence of anarchists in the workers’ movement.

Gordo also authored a bill that sought to regulate compensation in instances of conflict between capital and labor and it also included proposed government mediation. He was also responsible for a bill that passed into law in 1923. It was considered then as a legislation that restricted the freedom of the press. Gordo had also supported bills that introduced divorce in Brazil and those that advanced women's rights.

== Death ==
Gordo died on 29 June 1929.
