= Pierre-Joseph Pézerat =

French architect (1801–1872)

- Pedro José Pézerat
- Born: 1801; La Guiche, Burgundy, France
- Died: May 1, 1872; Lisbon, Portugal
- Occupations: Architect, engineer
- Years active: 1825–1872
- Notable work: Paço de São Cristóvão, Solar da Marquesa de Santos, São Paulo Baths, Municipal Slaughterhouse of Lisbon, Museum of the Caldas Hospital

Pierre-Joseph Pézerat, known in Portuguese as Pedro José Pézerat (La Guiche, France, 1801 — Lisbon, Portugal, May 1, 1872), was a French architect and engineer with works in Brazil, Algeria, and Portugal. Pézerat was born in Burgundy and was educated in Paris. Details of his education are lacking, but he may have studied at the École des Beaux-Arts under Antoine Vaudoyer. He moved to Brazil in 1825 and became the private architect of Emperor Pedro I in 1828. He renovated the São Cristóvão Palace in the Neoclassical style, and it remains his most noted work. Pézerat left Brazil to work for the French Ministry of War in Oran, Algeria, then worked for the Lisbon City Council from 1852 until his death in 1872.

Pézerat is credited for the introduction of the Neoclassical style in Brazil, but the style emerged in Brazil in the late 18th century, was strengthened by the French Artistic Mission, and continued by Pézerat and others to become the dominant architectural style in Brazil throughout the 19th century. Pézerat and another French architect, Grandjean de Montigny (1776–1850), are considered the principal figures in Brazilian architecture during the first half of the 19th century.

== Education ==
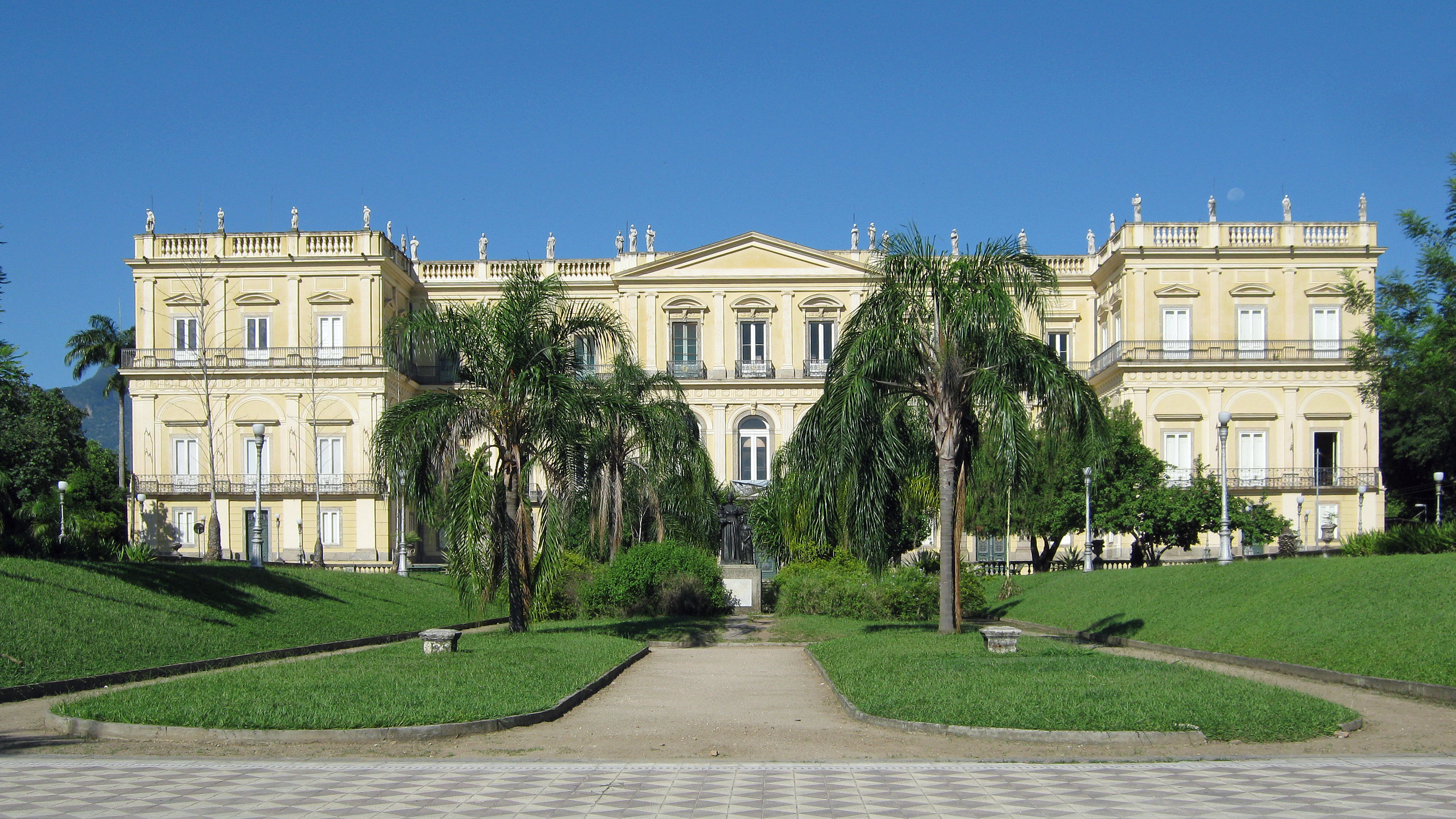
Palácio de São Cristóvão, later the National Museum of Brazil, before the 2018 fire

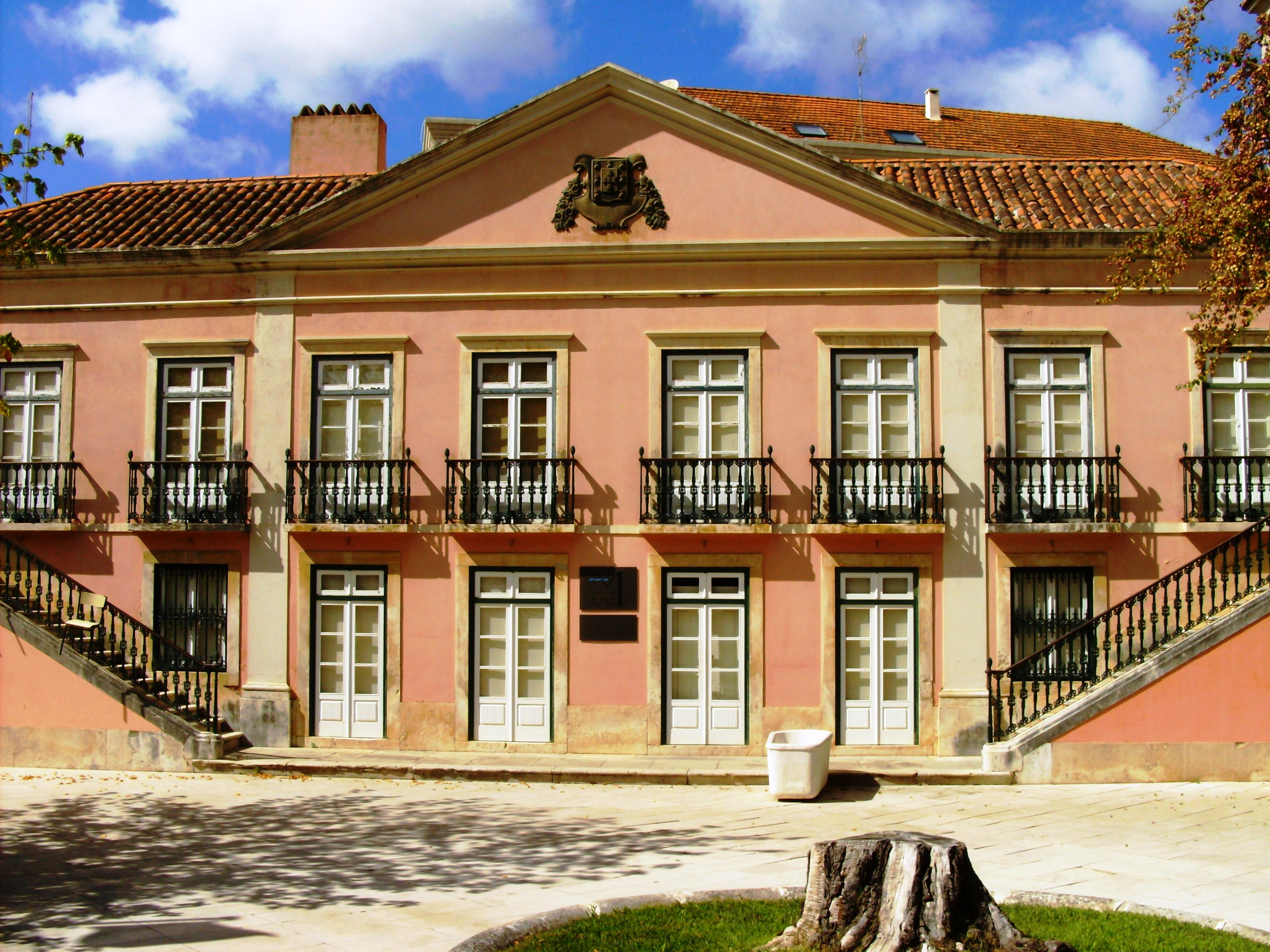
Museum of the Caldas Hospital, remodeled according to an 1861 plan by Pézerat

Pézerat was born in La Guiche, Burgundy in 1801, but his education is unclear. Documentation related to Pézerat's background and works were destroyed in the Lisbon City Hall fire in November 1863. Archives from the Lisbon Polytechnic Institute indicate that he may have been a student at the École Polytechnique in Paris in 1821, but no documents from the school confirm this information. Pézerat, seeking a position as chief engineer with the Portuguese Minister of Public Works stated in a letter that he completed his civil engineering studies in 1821 and that he subsequently pursued four years of theoretical studies at the Paris Academy of Architecture^{A}. He also indicated that he served as an inspector under leading architects associated with the academy.

These claims by Pézerat are contradicted by the archives. No document reveals what engineering studies he pursued before 1821. He was admitted to the École des Beaux-Arts in Paris on May 30, 1821, and was a student of Antoine Vaudoyer (1756–1846). He participated in the competitive examinations on June 7 and 12, 1821, but his name does not appear among the jury's records for the June 19, 1821, competition, which focused on the design of a tribune for a Christian church. He likely only attended the mathematics and construction courses, where he learned to prepare cost estimates, without participating in the competitions. The regulations of the École des Beaux-Arts stipulate that after a six-month absence, a student is expelled from the school. He was, therefore, only a student at the École des Beaux-Arts in Paris for a few months.

== In Brazil (1825-1831) ==
Pézerat was one of many European intellectuals invited by Emperor Pedro I to develop Brazilian infrastructure, technical capacity, and the arts. His arrival in 1825 followed the French Artistic Mission in Brazil of 1816 under Dom João VI, which similarly sought to modernize the arts and arts education in Brazil. Pézerat reported to Rio de Janeiro, was appointed to the rank of Captain of Engineering Corp (Capitão de Engenharia), and served for a year at Rio de Janeiro Military Academy to work on geodesic plans and maps. Pézerat renovated the façade of the Hotel of the Marquis de Santos in Rio de Janeiro in this period, 1826–1827.

Pézerat remained in Rio de Janeiro and became the private architect of Emperor Pedro I in 1828 as part of the Emperor's Primeiro reinado, or the "First reign". He was inspired by the works of the French Ancien Régime to Pedro I and "imported the architectural symbolism of the French royal crown, adapting it to the reality of the Brazilian imperial crown." Pézerat moved to the São Cristóvão Palace in Quinta da Boa Vista and remodeled the structure into the Neoclassical style, finishing work in 1831. The mansion now houses the Museum of the First Reign. They "represent some of his most emblematic works on Brazilian soil."

== In Algeria (1831-1840) ==
Pézerat left Brazil with the royal family after the abdication of Pedro I in April 1831. He did not, however, follow Pedro I to Portugal, and instead returned to France. Pézerat then requested an engineering position from the French government, and served in Algeria from 1831 to 1840. Pézerat reported to Algiers in 1831 and was appointed Civil Engineer 1st class (Engenheiro civil de 1ª classe). Ten months later he was sent to Oran, and the Ministry of War appointed Pézerat as Architect and Engineer of Bridges and Roads to Oran. His main focus was the municipal water supply and sewage systems.

He drew up a plan of Place Kléber (now Place Boudali-Hasni) in 1834, but was dismissed from his position following the reorganization of the Bridges and Roads department. The Governor-General of Algeria, Thomas Robert Bugeaud (1784–1849), the called him to join a group of scholars and artists to explore the interior of Algeria. Pézerat did not join the group, and left Oran for France in January 1838, but returned there with his family in September 1840. His family contracted dysentery in Oran, so he left Algeria for Portugal at the end of 1840.

== In Portugal (1840-1872) ==
Pézerat settled in Portugal after his work in Algeria. He led the Technical Department of the Lisbon City Council (Repartição Técnica da Câmara Municipal de Lisboa) from 1852 to 1872. The period was marked by both political disagreements and discord in Lisbon between the municipal and central government. Pézerat initially worked on projects related to the municipal water supply, but quickly moved to urban planning and architectural projects, such as the project for the São Paulo Baths (Banhos de São Paulo, 1850) and the new Municipal Slaughterhouse (Matadouro Municipal de Lisboa, 1852). In 1853, he was hired as a drawing professor at the Polytechnic School of Lisbon and, with the engineer Silva e Costa, was responsible for the remodeling of the school building, previously damaged in a fire. He additionally designed some buildings on the same street as the Polytechnic School. In 1861, Pézerat drew up a plan to remodel a building at the Queen D. Leonor Thermal Hospital (Hospital Termal Rainha D. Leonor) in Caldas da Rainha. The building is now used as the Museum of the Caldas Hospital.

Health problems forced Pézerat to travel to France in 1859 for treatment. From then on, his health began to limit his ability to work, but he continued to hold a position at the Lisbon City Council until his death. In 1865, Pézerat was part of the Commission for the Improvement of the City of Lisbon and presented several projects for the revitalization and urban modernization of the city. They were rejected by the City Council due to economic limitations. Domingos Parente da Silva (1836–1901) became the city architect in 1866, and established a friendship with the ailing Pézerat.

== Death ==
Pezerat's illness worsened in the following years, and he died at home in 1872, blind and poor. His position at the Lisbon City Council was filled in 1874 by the prolific civil engineer and later politician Frederico Ressano Garcia (1846–1911). A fire destroyed the City Hall building of Lisbon on the night of November 19–20, 1863. Much information about the urban planning of Lisbon in the 19th century was lost, along with most of Pezerat's plans, documentation, and technical writing.

== Bibliography ==
- Pézerat, Pierre-Joseph. Dados e estudos para um projecto de abastecimento de agoas e sua distribuição em Lisboa. Typographia do Jornal do Commercio, 1855.

== Works ==
- Solar da Marquesa de Santos, in Rio de Janeiro (1824–1827)
- Paço de São Cristóvão, Rio de Janeiro (1828–1831)
- Entrance gate of the Our Lady of Solitude Cemetery, Belém, Pará (1850)
- Building of the São Paulo Baths, Lisbon (1850–1858)
- Municipal Slaughterhouse of Lisbon (1852)
- Remodel of the present-day Museum of the Caldas Hospital at the Queen D. Leonor Thermal Hospital, Caldas da Rainha (1861)

== Footnote ==
A. This is likely a reference to the architecture section of the Académie des beaux-arts. The Académie royale d'architecture was abolished in 1793, then revived and merged in 1816 into the above organization. It was reconstituted within the Institute of France, created in 1795, with architecture forming one of the sections of the class of literature and fine arts. It was then reorganized into its current form in 1816, within the Academy of Fine Arts of the Institute of France.
