= Jefinho =

Jefinho is a masculine name, often a short form of the given names Jefferson or Jeferson. Notable people with the name include:

- Jefinho (footballer, born 1994), full name Jefesson Vieira Eufrazio, Brazilian football forward
- Jefinho (footballer, born 2006), full name Jefferson Borges do Nascimento, Brazilian football midfielder
- Jefinho (Paralympic footballer), full name Jeferson da Conceição Gonçalves, Brazilian Paralympic 5-a-side football player

== See also ==
- Jeffinho, full name Jefferson Ruan Pereira dos Santos, Brazilian football winger
