= Mata da Estrela Private Natural Heritage Reserve =

- Reserva Particular do Patrimônio Natural Mata da Estrela
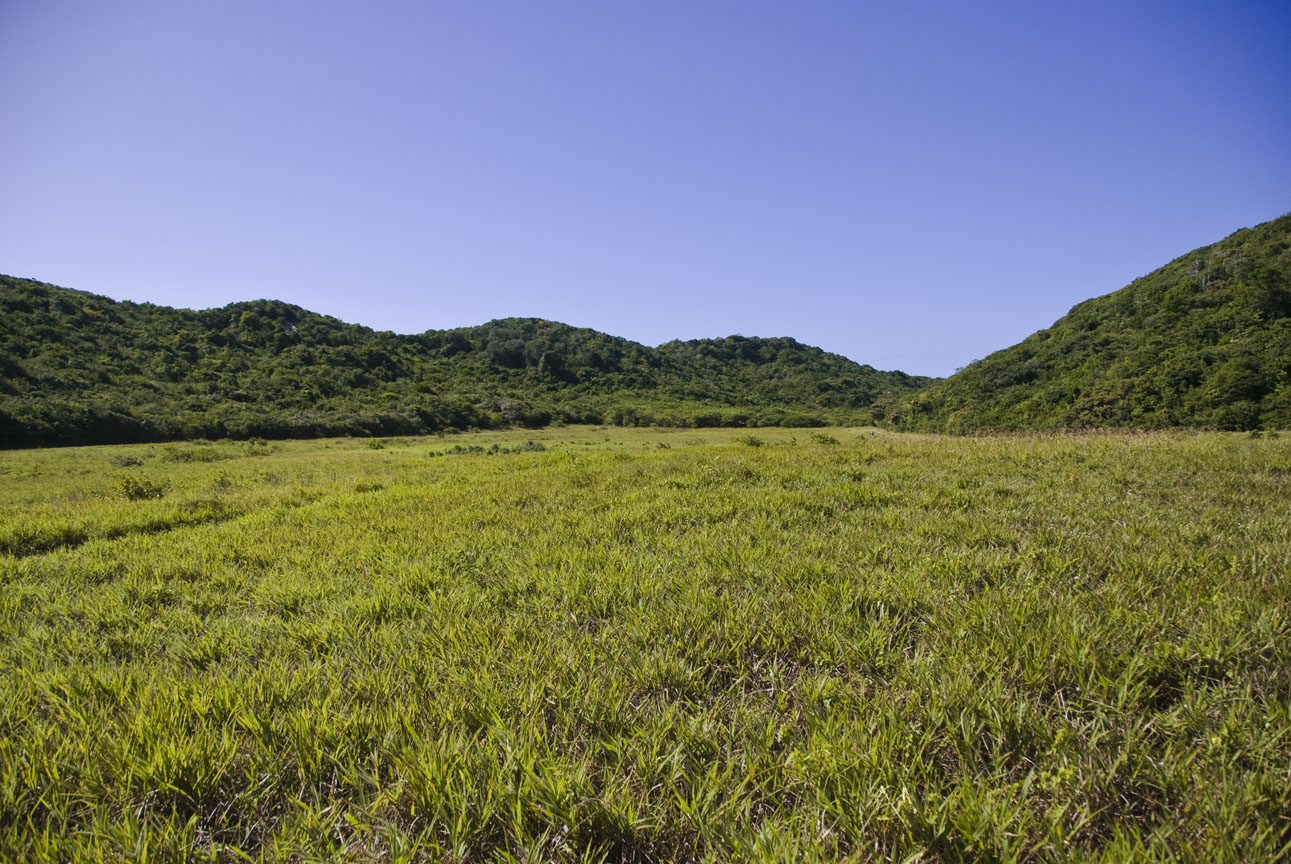
- Mata Estrela Reserve

- Location within Brazil
- Nearest city: Baía Formosa, Rio Grande do Norte
- Coordinates: 6°24′25″S 34°59′28″W
- Area: 2,039.93 hectares (5,040.8 acres)
- Designation: Private natural heritage reserve
- Created: 30 March 2000

Mata da Estrela Private Natural Heritage Reserve (Portuguese: Reserva Particular do Patrimônio Natural Mata da Estrela) is a private natural heritage reserve in the state of Rio Grande do Norte, Brazil.

== Location ==
The reserve is in the municipality of Baía Formosa in Rio Grande do Norte, and covers 2,039.93 hectares (5,040.8 acres). It is owned by Destilaria Baía Formosa and is part of the 7,897 hectares (19,510 acres) Fazenda Pedrosa in the municipality of Baía Formosa, Rio Grande do Norte. The reserve was created on 30 March 2000 by Marilia Marreco Cerqueira, President of the Brazilian Institute of Environment and Renewable Natural Resources (IBAMA). It takes its name Mata da Estrela (Star Forest) from its shape. The forest is beside the sea on dunes. Studies describe the broader Mata Estrela area as comprising forest, dunes and lagoons, and report nineteen lagoons within the area.

== Environment ==
The reserve holds a remnant of Atlantic Forest in an area that was largely deforested to make way for sugar cane plantations. The forest is open to visitors who wish to experience the varied flora and fauna. A local guide will interpret the environment. The reserve holds the Lagoa Araraquara, also called the Coca-Cola Lagoon due to its dark colour. Pau-Brasil (Caesalpinia echinata) is native to the forest. There are Gameleira trees (of the family Moraceae) with a diameter equal to 8 men holding hands. The fauna and flora of the forest are being mapped and described by NGOs and universities authorized by the owner.

== Sources ==
- Marilia Marreco Cerqueira (30 March 2000), Portaria No 20, de 30 de Marco de 2000 (PDF) (in Portuguese), Diário Oficial da União / IBAMA
- "Mata Estrela e Lagoa", baiaformosa.com.br (in Portuguese)
- RPPN – Mata Estrela (in Portuguese), Grupo Farias
- RPPN Mata Estrela (in Portuguese), ICMBio
- Govindin, Julienne Louise dos Santos; Miller, Francisca de Souza (2015), "Práticas sociais e simbólicas: comunidade de pescadores e unidade de conservação em Baía Formosa/RN" (PDF), Sociedade & Natureza (in Portuguese)
- Palmeira, C. N. S. (2022), "Preliminary inventory of the anuran fauna of the Mata Estrela Private Natural Heritage Reserve, in the Atlantic Forest of the State of Rio Grande do Norte, Brazil" (PDF), Herpetología
- Henrique, A. L. S. L. (2011), CAPROM – Material educativo sobre a Lagoa Araraquara (PDF) (in Portuguese)
- Araújo, R. F. (2022), Inventário turístico de Baía Formosa (in Portuguese)
- Bezerra, A. C. C. (2010), Estudo sobre a Trilha Coca-Cola – Baía Formosa/RN (PDF) (in Portuguese)
