= Baía Formosa =

Municipality in Rio Grande do Norte, Brazil

- Municipality
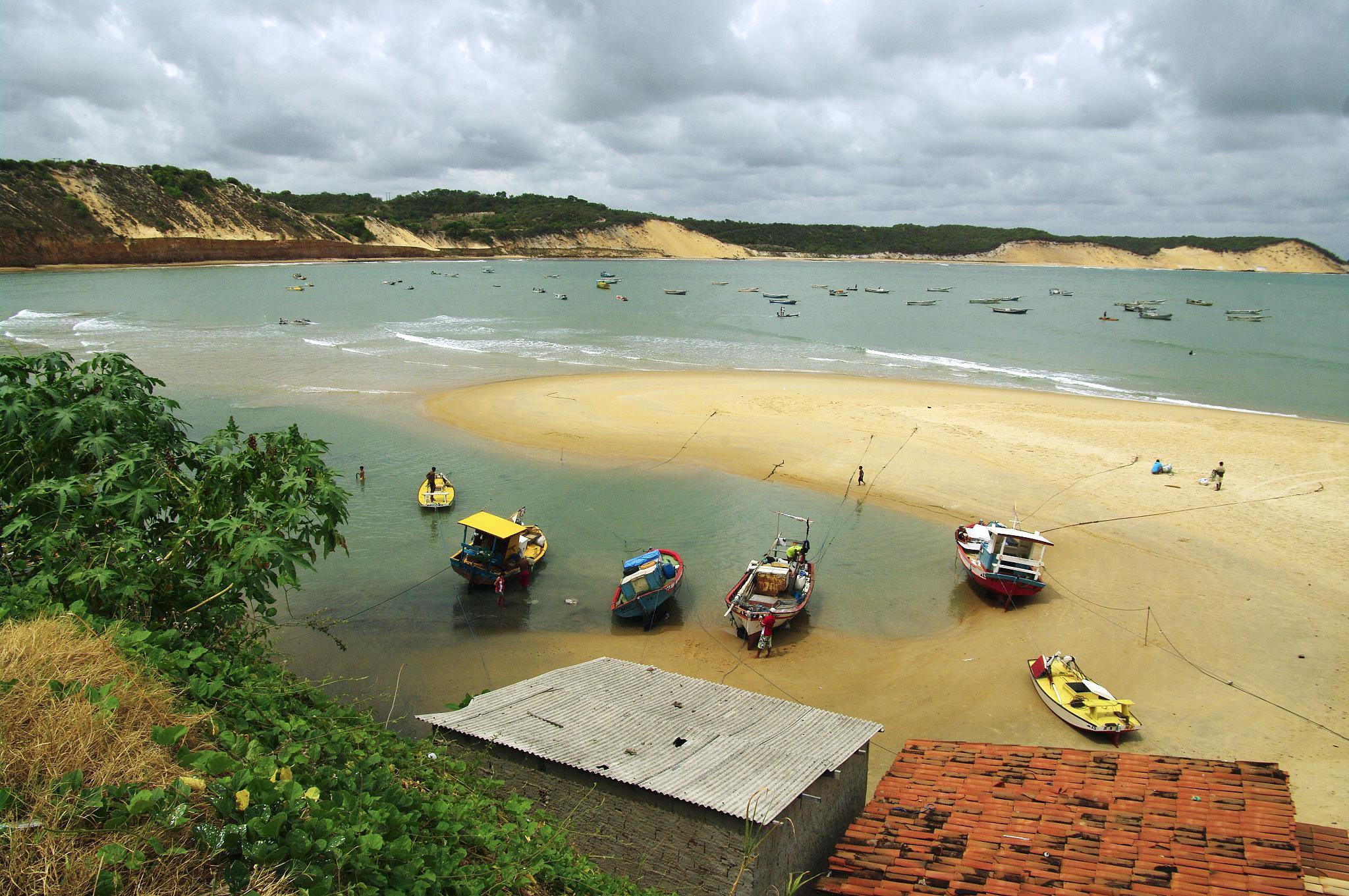
- Praia do Porto

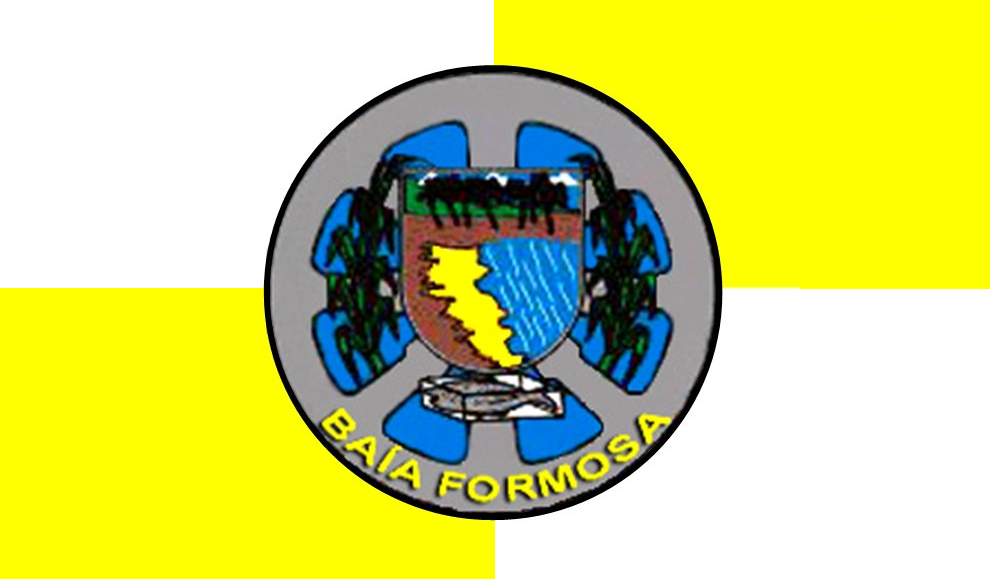
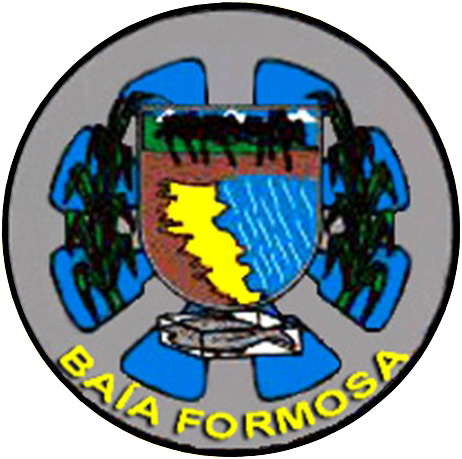
- Flag Coat of arms

- Location of Baía Formosa
- Coordinates: 06°22′08″S 35°00′28″W
- Country: Brazil
- Region: Northeast
- State: Rio Grande do Norte
- Founded: December 31, 1958

Government
  - Mayor: José Nivaldo Araújo de Melo

Area
  - Total: 247.484 km^{2} (95.554 sq mi)

Population (2022)
  - Total: 8,825
- Time zone: UTC−3 (BRT)
- HDI (2010): 0.609 – medium

Baía Formosa (lit. "beautiful bay") is the easternmost municipality in the Brazilian state of Rio Grande do Norte and the first coastal city (going south–north) of that state, lying near the border with Paraíba. With an area of 247.484 square kilometers (95.554 sq mi), of which 1.665 square kilometres (0.643 sq mi) is urban, it is located 72 km from Natal, the state capital, and 1,748 km from Brasília, the federal capital. Its population in the 2022 demographic census was 8,825 inhabitants, according to the Brazilian Institute of Geography and Statistics (IBGE), ranking as the 78th most populous municipality in the state of Rio Grande do Norte.

== Geography ==
The territory of Baía Formosa covers 247.484 square kilometers (95.554 sq mi), of which 1.665 square kilometres (0.643 sq mi) constitutes the urban area. It sits at an average altitude of 4 meters above sea level. Bordered to the east by the Atlantic Ocean, the municipality has just over 23 km of coastline and borders two municipalities: Canguaretama to the north and west, and Mataraca, in Paraíba, to the south. The city is located 72 km from the state capital Natal, and 1,748 km from the federal capital Brasília.

Under the territorial division established in 2017 by the Brazilian Institute of Geography and Statistics (IBGE), the municipality belongs to the immediate geographical region of Canguaretama, within the intermediate region of Natal. Previously, under the microregion and mesoregion divisions, it was part of the microregion of Litoral Sul in the mesoregion of Leste Potiguar. The municipality contains the 7,897-hectare (19,510-acre) Mata da Estrela Private Natural Heritage Reserve.

== Demographics ==
In the 2022 census, the municipality had a population of 8,825 inhabitants and ranked only 78th in the state that year (out of 167 municipalities), with 50.89% male and 49.11% female, resulting in a sex ratio of 103.62 (10,362 men for every 10,000 women), compared to 8,573 inhabitants in the 2010 census (83.14% living in the urban area), when it held the 77th state position. Between the 2010 and 2022 censuses, the population of Baía Formosa changed at an annual geometric growth rate of 0.24%. Regarding age group in the 2022 census, 69.64% of the inhabitants were between 15 and 64 years old, 21.19% were under fifteen, and 9.17% were 65 or older. The population density in 2022 was 35.66 inhabitants per square kilometer, with an average of 3.17 inhabitants per household.

The municipality's Human Development Index (HDI-M) is considered medium, according to data from the United Nations Development Programme. According to the 2010 report published in 2013, its value was 0.609, ranking seventh in the state and 2,386th nationally (out of 5,565 municipalities), and the Gini coefficient rose from 0.36 in 2003 to 0.48 in 2010. Considering only the longevity index, its value is 0.718, the income index is 0.59, and the education index is 0.534.

== Notable people ==
- Ítalo Ferreira, world champion surfer
