= Battle of Jenipapo =

1823 battle of the Brazilian War of Independence

- Part of the Brazilian War of Independence
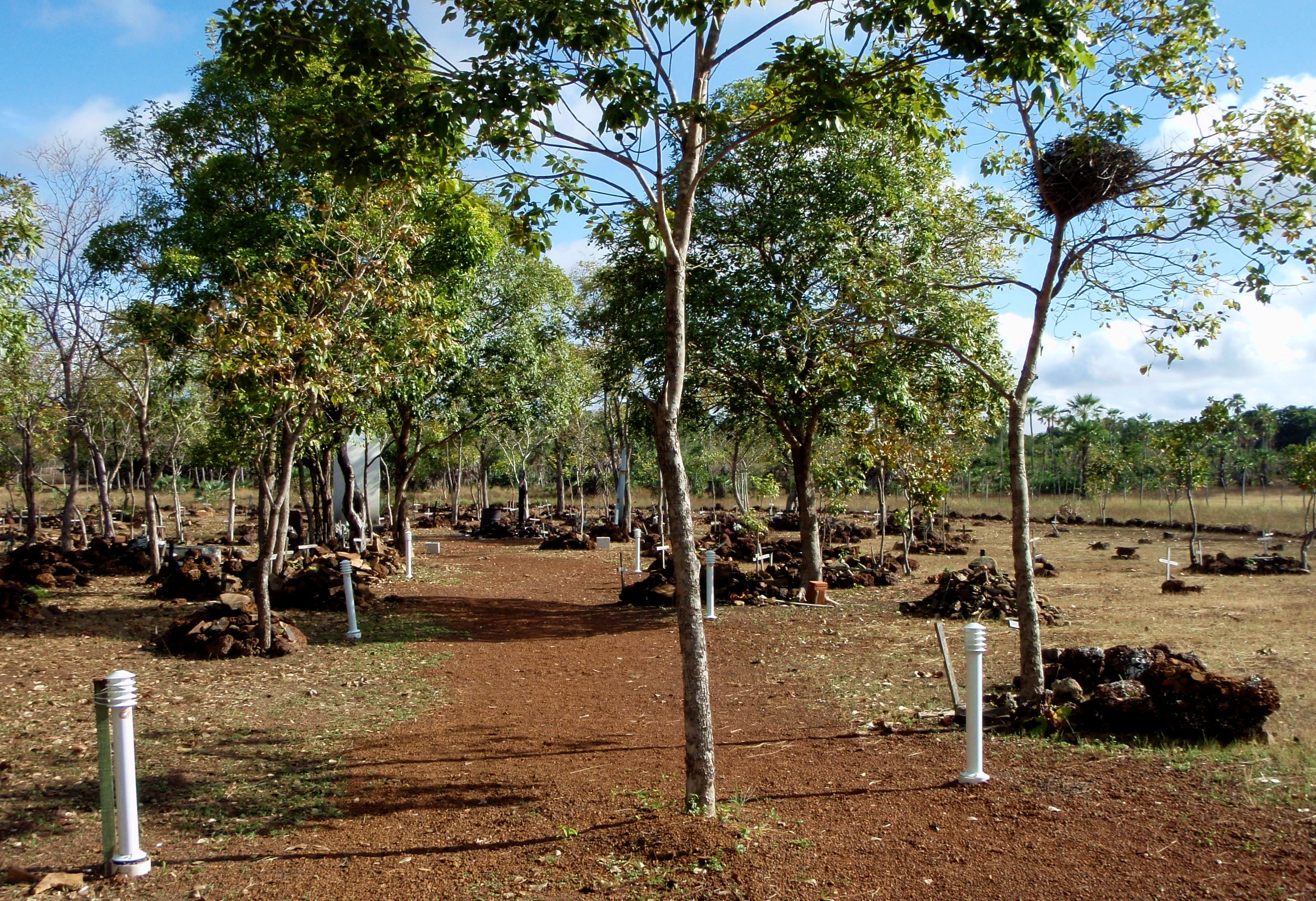
- The Batalhão Cemetery, near the site of the battle
Date	13 March 1823
Location	Near the river Jenipapo in Piauí, Brazil 4°46′56″S 42°7′8″W
Result	Portuguese victory

Belligerents
Empire of Brazil	Kingdom of Portugal

Commanders and leaders
Luís Rodrigues Chaves; Francisco Inácio da Costa	João José da Cunha Fidié

Strength
2,000 militia 2 cannons	1,600 regulars 11 cannons

Casualties and losses
742: 200 killed and wounded 542 prisoners	79: 19 killed 60 wounded

The Battle of Jenipapo was fought near the Jenipapo river in the then province of Piauí, on 13 March 1823, between the Imperial Brazilian Army and the Portuguese Army during the Brazilian War of Independence.

The battle was decisive for the independence of Brazil and consolidation of its national sovereign. The action involved Brazilian forces from Piauí, Ceará and Maranhão that engaged the Portuguese forces of Major John Fidié José da Cunha, charged with keeping the north of the former Portuguese colony loyal to the Crown. The Brazilians fought with farming tools, and had neither combat experience nor military training. The Piauians lost the battle, but their resistance made the Portuguese troops divert from their original destination. Had Fidié continued the march to Oeiras, the capital of Piauí at that time, the Piauians may not have had sufficient strength to deal with the larger Portuguese forces. It was one of the fiercest and bloodiest battles fought in the Brazilian war of independence.

Though widely cited by the historiography, the battle was largerly forgotten, and few Brazilians know of the incident, even in Piauí, where the events occurred. But, after a campaign led by politicians, historians and the public, the date of the action was added to the flag of Piauí. There are ongoing efforts to include the Battle of Jenipapo in the educational curriculum. During the celebrations of 13 March, the city of Campo Maior awards the Merit Medal of Heroes of Jenipapo to people and institutions whose actions had helped to improve community life in Piauí. The Governor of Piauí, meanwhile, awards the Piauí Renaissance, an order of merit.

== The battle ==
The population of Campo Maior learned that Fidié was coming from Parnaíba and bound for Oeiras. They were able to mobilize and be there in order to prevent him from continuing his journey.

On the night of 12 March, the men of the city and surrounding areas were enlisted and organized into regiments. The population was motivated to fight to rid Piauí of Portuguese rule. Women encouraged their husbands, relatives and friends, packed up what they could and sold valuables like jewelry as part of their commitment to unite for the struggle. The dawn on 13 March 1823, heralded a clear day with few clouds and very hot. It was a year in which drought punished the Northeast.

At the command signal, all the local men gathered in front of the Church of St. Anthony. The combatants of Piauí and Ceará did not wear uniforms. Outside the city and ready to meet Fidié, there was a performance with the band music in which there was a military parade. The mass of fighters who would fight for Brazil's independence left elated to the sound of the drums. Historians note that without even knowing their fate, they took with them the flame of freedom burning in the chest. The certainty of death did not take the spirits of those who would die for their country. About two thousand men marched into battle. Besides a few rifles, the weapons they used were primitive: old swords, spears, axes, knives and sickles, sticks and stones.

Without any experience in wars, piauienses reached the shores of Jenipapo river, where they intended to prevent the passage of Fidié. As the creek was almost dry, most patriots hid himself in the very bed of the stream, while the other part is hidden in the thickets of scrub drain near the ravine. And they were waiting for the Portuguese army, which, of course, had to pass that way. Where were you could see when the Portuguese were close to the scene of the fight because the terrain was quite flat, with vast plains, flat open and without shelter. The Brazilians were entrenched and knew that ahead of them was a road split in two, one for right and one left. Only they were in doubt from what of the paths coming Fidié. Shortly after eight o'clock, Captain Rodrigues Chaves sent a patrol to probe where the battle would be fought.

Fidié forces marched to the crossroads and decided to send one half of the army on one side and half on the other side. He led the infantry to the left while the cavalry was on the right. The independent, not knowing that the division Fidié had done in his contingent were right by the road meeting with the Portuguese cavalry, being surprised. They advanced bravely against cavalry. The Portuguese were dismayed with the courage and bravery of Piauí, where they ended up retreating. At this time the Piauienses chased the Portuguese inland road.

The combatants Piauí, hearing the shooting, learned that the confrontation had begun. They came out of the trenches and were precitadamente the road right behind the enemy, only the Portuguese troops were no longer there. Fidié to learn of the incident crossed the river Jenipapo the left road, hastily built a barricade, distributed heavy weapons, organized the shooters position battlefront (online) in the trenches where they were before the Piauí and hoped they return there. Before the Brazilians were in a favorable position now everything is reversed.

When Piauienses saw the adverse situation only found an alternative, attacking Fidié the same time and in all directions along the banks of the river. In the first moment of the fight were many casualties on the part of Piauí. Dozens of bodies fell by the bullets of the Portuguese army. The few who managed to cross the line of fire gave their last breath to the mouth of the cannon, with great boldness not fearing anything against life but for country representation in tremendous love for the same. With this demonstration of love for the motherland and bravery that Piauienses had meant that the Portuguese stay scared, because they have never seen such audacity anywhere in the world.

Successive attacks as a result of Piauí had many dead on the floor. The musketry and cannon fire of the Portuguese swept the battlefield from one side to the other. Those who could pass by blocking fire could grapple with the Portuguese. At noon, the piauienses were tired and not sure that would win the Portuguese, this time no longer fought over crawled to the encounter with death. At two o'clock in the afternoon, after five hours of fighting, the liberators withdrew in disorder, leaving 542 prisoners, 200 killed and wounded, Fidié, whose losses were estimated at 116 dead and 60 wounded, parked on the Tombador ranch, about one kilometer from Campo Maior. Fidié and his army fell tired. The sun scorching and fear of a Piauiense counterattack not allow the Portuguese troops should pursue the Brazilians, even though they had already defeated them. The Ceará Captain Nereus at the time of withdrawal led most of the baggage of the Portuguese, consisting of food, water, some weapons and even a small treasure Fidié brought the plunder they had done in the city of Parnaíba.

Fidié spent two days in the city of Campo Maior burying their dead. On 16 March 1823, left the city and led his troops to Porto Estanhado, on the border with the state of Maranhão.

Fidié was taken prisoner months later after the siege of Caxias and taken to Oeiras, from where he was sent to Rio de Janeiro. Fidié was eventually sent back to Portugal, where he was received with military honors for services to the Portuguese Crown. Among the titleshe received the Commander of the Order of Avis, the oldest military decoration Portuguese founded by Afonso Henriques in 1162. Just received this commendation the soldier who showed extreme bravery, boldness and courage. In the place where there was the Battle Monument was erected in memory of the Piauienses who died there for the independence of their country. Situated on the left bank of the river is actually an attractive tourist spot and is also a part of the collection used by war fighters. These pieces belonged to the former Museum of the leather that has been transferred there.

== Batalhão Cemetery ==
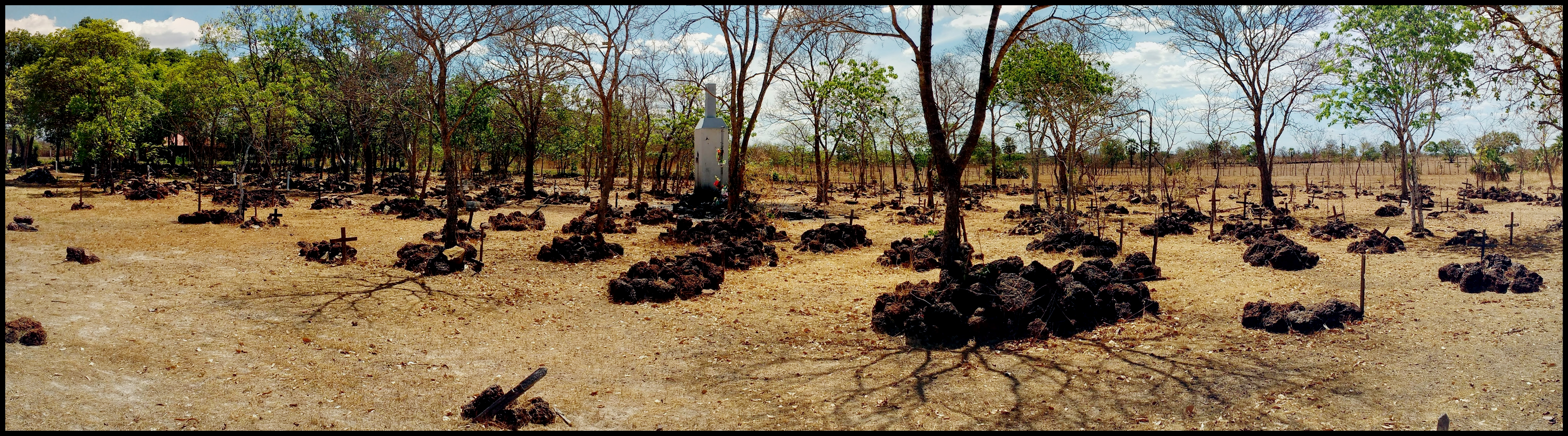
Batalhão Cemetery

The Batalhão cemetery, located in the municipality of Campo Maior, is home to the remains of the fallen Brazilian heroes of the battle.

== Bibliography ==
- Varnhagen, Francisco Adolfo de (2010). História da Independência do Brasil (PDF) (in Portuguese). Senado Federal. ISBN 978-85-7018-279-1.
- Kraay, Hendrik (2004). Race, State, and Armed Forces in Independence-era Brazil: Bahia, 1790s-1840s. Stanford University Press. ISBN 9780804751018.
