= Jefinho (footballer, born 2006) =

Brazilian footballer

Personal information
- Full name: Jefferson Borges do Nascimento
- Date of birth: 15 August 2006 (age 20)
- Place of birth: Montanhas, Brazil
- Position: Midfielder

Team information
- Current team: Sport Recife
- Number: 62

Youth career
- 2019–: Sport Recife
- 2023: → Coritiba (loan)

Senior career*
Years	Team	Apps	(Gls)
2025–	Sport Recife	4	(0)
- * Club domestic league appearances and goals as of 14:49, 17 September 2025 (UTC)

Jefferson Borges do Nascimento (born 15 August 2006), commonly known as Jefinho, is a Brazilian professional footballer who plays as a midfielder for Sport Recife.

== Career ==
Born in Montanhas, Rio Grande do Norte, Jefinho joined the youth categories of Sport Recife in 2019. On 4 September 2022, he signed his first professional contract with the club, agreeing to a deal until 2025.

Jefinho spent the 2023 season on loan at Coritiba, playing in their under-17 team. Upon returning, he started to feature with Sport's under-20 team, and made his first team debut on 11 January 2025, starting in a 1–1 Campeonato Pernambucano away draw against Afogados, as the club fielded an under-20 squad.

Jefinho was promoted to the main squad by head coach Daniel Paulista in July 2025, and made his Série A debut on 14 July, coming on as a second-half substitute for Chrystian Barletta in a 2–0 away loss to Juventude.

== Career statistics ==
As of 17 September 2025

Appearances and goals by club, season and competition
Club	Season	League			State League (Note: Includes Campeonato Pernambucano)		Cup (Note: Includes Copa do Brasil)		Other		Total	
Club	Season	Division	Apps	Goals	Apps	Goals	Apps	Goals	Apps	Goals	Apps	Goals
Sport Recife	2025	Série A	1	0	3	0	0	0	0	0	4	0
Career total			1	0	3	0	0	0	0	0	4	0
