= Adolfo Gordo Law =

Brazilian law

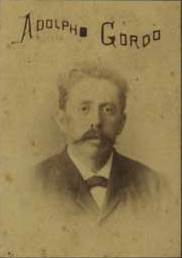
Adolfo Gordo

The Adolfo Gordo Law (Decree No. 1641/1907) was a measure to repress labor movements in São Paulo at the beginning of the 20th century. Among other provisions, it proposed the expulsion of foreigners involved in strikes with the objective of repressing anarchist and anarcho-syndicalist militants. It was suggested by Adolfo Gordo, a federal deputy from São Paulo, and approved in 1907. According to historian Claudio Batalha in his book O Movimento Operário na Primeira República, under this law, 132 foreigners were expelled in the first year, a high number compared to the 556 expulsions between 1908 and 1921. Later, in 1919, came the Law on Accidents at Work, which guaranteed compensation for workers, laborers or apprentices in the event of injuries in services using machinery.

In 1923, now as a senator, Gordo created another bill, also nicknamed the Adolfo Gordo Law, but with the aim of censoring the press; as a result, it earned the nickname "infamous law" in journalistic circles. To some extent, it also had contributions from Azevedo Marques, who was Minister of Foreign Affairs at the time. Three traits unite all the projects that carried the politician's name: defense of economic interests, governability and maintaining social peace.

== Historical context ==
At the beginning of the 1910s, the workers' movement in Brazil intensified. After the communist victory in the Russian Revolution of 1905 and the relationship between this event and the arrival of European immigrants in the country, workers' organizations saw this as a chance to put an end to capitalist exploitation of labor. In 1917, 70,000 employees in São Paulo went on strike for a week, demanding better wages and decent working conditions. In the end, an agreement guaranteed a 20% increase in their pay.

In the 1920s, repression, including in the legislative sphere, became ever greater. Among the government's reasons for interfering in the workers' struggle, was that the movement was artificially controlled by foreigners, radical leaders who deluded Brazilian employees. At this point, the 1921 Law on the Expulsion of Foreigners was introduced, proposing the summary deportation of people involved in organizations symbolizing disorder and within workers' actions.

Soon, anarchism became an important issue in Brazil's big cities. In the context of oligarchic decisions, workers in the first two decades of the 20th century welcomed a reduction in working hours. Another movement that defined itself in the country was communism, after the founding of the PCB (Brazilian Communist Party).

=== Adolfo Gordo ===
Adolfo Afonso da Silva Gordo, born in Piracicaba, had a law degree from the São Francisco College, and was a federal deputy and senator. He was governor of Rio Grande do Norte from December 6, 1889, until February 8, 1890, during the provisional government after the Proclamation of the Republic. He represented São Paulo in the Constituent Assembly installed on November 15, 1890, which would later result in the 1891 Constitution.

== Background ==
Although there was the influence of the Russian Revolution of 1905, the main focus was anarcho-syndicalism. Despite the fight against anarchist influences surfacing in the 1920s after changes were made to the Law on the Expulsion of Foreigners, the aversion to the movement and its philosophy was already present in Adolfo Gordo's speech. When defending the 1907 law that bore his name, he referred to the anarchist as "dangerous, a professional criminal and comes to our country with sinister plans".

According to Adolfo, "in the early days, the anarchism studies our language and our institutions, getting to know our country and forming relationships... Isn't it clear that its action can be much more nefarious, much more dangerous, after this preliminary work? Isn't it clear that its action can be much more harmful, much more dangerous after this preliminary work, than when it first arrived?" In this excerpt, he speaks exclusively of the movement as something foreign, referring also to the repression of possible union leaders who were expelled from the country for creating "disorder" in the country.

In another quote, Adolfo Gordo mentions deportation and talks about the right of the Federal Government, classifying it as "the power to force a foreigner, deemed dangerous, to leave national territory, regardless of legal proceedings and conviction".

== The measures ==
=== Law on the Expulsion of Foreigners ===
After slavery ended in Brazil, São Paulo's coffee farmers needed a new type of workforce. Encouraging the migratory flow, the state government welcomed the immigrants and redirected them to rural areas. As friction arose between the bosses and the workers coming from abroad, the disagreements sparked anarchist and socialist ideas from the foreigners themselves, in view of the working conditions at the time.

Over time, the category became unwanted by employers. In 1894, the idea of expulsion emerged with Bill 109-B, which was approved by the Chamber of Deputies but not by the Senate; the same thing happened with Bill 317-A in 1902. In 1906, after the rejections, the issue returned to the agenda and was approved and sanctioned by the President of the Republic. The government's main concern was that foreigners would "threaten" the nation, as can be seen in the text of the law.

Adolfo Gordo argued that a foreigner who had lived in the country for two years, for example, could be even more dangerous than a newcomer. Regarding those married to Brazilian women with children in the country, he felt that expulsion was unrelated to family members, since they would have the option of accompanying the foreigner or not.

Initially created to repress rural workers, it was used much more in the urban sphere when the 1917 strike mobilized 70,000 workers in the city of São Paulo for better conditions in industry. In 1919, the issue was discussed again and a new bill was introduced with changes to the regulations regarding the entry conditions for foreigners; it became known as the second Adolfo Gordo Law.

=== Law on Accidents at Work ===
As Senator, Adolfo Gordo, assisted by the São Paulo State Department of Labor, presented the draft of the Law on Accidents at Work to the Federal Senate on July 25, 1915. During its discussion, it was combated by the Industrial Center of Brazil in the Chamber of Deputies. After it was approved in 1918, it became part of Decree No. 3,274 of January 15, 1919, which regulated the proposals. Until then, the current theory in the workplace was based on culpability. It referred to "proven guilt" or "presumed guilt", assuming that the victim of the accident had to appeal to the courts in order for something to be proved against their employer, which, considering the living conditions of the workers, contributed to impunity.

With the change, Adolfo introduced the doctrine of "professional risk", which accepted that the employer would be responsible for providing compensation to victims in the event of accidents in the course of work; the expense should be included in the industry's general expenses. The amendments would include workers and apprentices who would receive compensation for accidents when working on machines.

Some requirements were essential for compensation: the accident had to have occurred at work and as a result of work and the employer had to employ more than five men, with the exception of dangerous services. In addition, the consequences to be covered by the rules were death, permanent incapacity and temporary partial incapacity. Based on these definitions, pensions would be set.

Payment could be made individually or collectively and directly through an "unseizable" guarantee fund, an authorized insurance company or a guarantee union. In the latter two cases, no deductions were made from the workers' salaries. After all the obstruction by the business community, postponed votes and twists and turns in the discussions, the law was launched with the changes demanded by the disgruntled class regarding the form of payment of pensions and medical and pharmaceutical aid, which would be paid at the place of the establishment where the unexpected happened. The employer's participation in the medical and pharmaceutical care processes was not institutionalized.

=== Press Law ===
Known as the "infamous law" by some journalists, the Press Law, or Decree No. 4,743 of October 31, 1923, was drafted as a bill with a few articles and divided opinions among the media. The demands were: a ban on anonymity in any section, with the exception of news, announcements, notices, propaganda, public notices and events of the same kind; and the right of reply instituted with a more dynamic and reliable process, ensuring this process for the requester. Azevedo Marques, until then the Minister of Foreign Affairs of the country, also contributed to the draft.

Jornal do Comércio, O Dia and A Folha da Noite were totally against and critical of the law, describing it with adjectives such as "disaster", "monstrous", "unfortunate" and "infamous". In their view, the act was an attempt by Adolfo and the government to adapt Brazil to French legislation without considering that the country had a different dynamic. In addition, they accused him of "attacking the freedom of the press", in reference to the end of anonymity. Other analyses considered that the idea behind the bill was to restrict the workers' press due to the anarchist movements of 1917 and 1919.

On the other hand, newspapers such as A Imprensa, Gazeta de Notícias, O País and A Platéia saw the measure as a way of preventing the "excesses" of the periodicals, saying that those who were responsible were not afraid of the initiative. With the same opinion, A Folha, A Tribuna and Jornal do Comércio thought the action was necessary, but saw the discussion as inopportune because the country was in a state of siege.

Associations such as the Nationalist League and the Lawyers' Institute of Rio de Janeiro and São Paulo were opposed, with the latter even drawing up a counter-draft. The law received presidential sanction and effectively acquired this title after undergoing some modifications during its passage. Later, it was renamed the Adolfo Gordo Law.

== See also ==
- Russian Revolution of 1905
- Brazilian Communist Party
- Anarchism in Brazil
- Brazilian Workers' Confederation
