= Arês, Rio Grande do Norte =

Municipality in Rio Grande do Norte, Brazil

Coordinates: 6°11′S 35°09′W

Arês
- Municipality
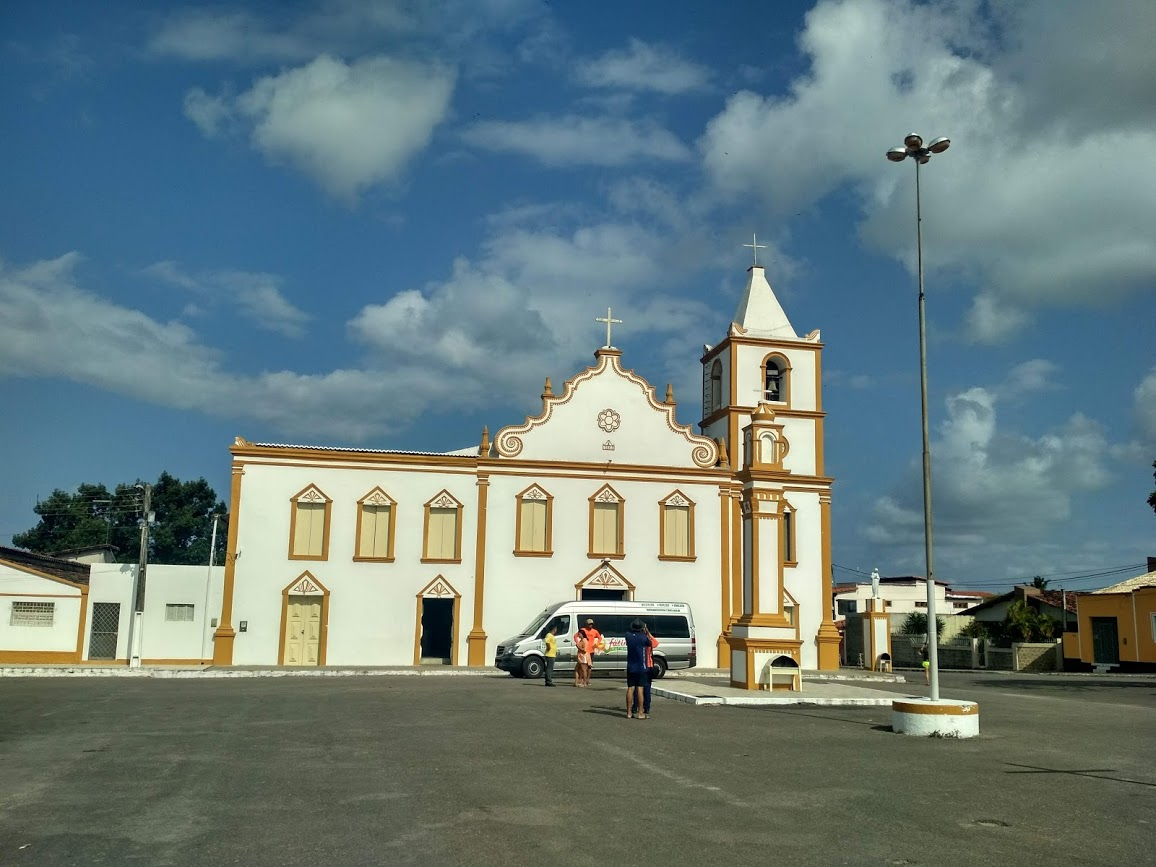
- São João Batista de Guaraíras church

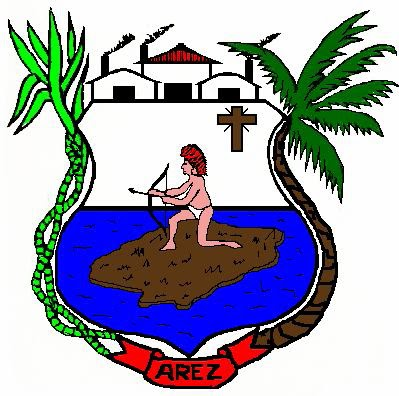
- Coat of arms
- Interactive map of Arês
- Country: Brazil
- Region: Nordeste
- State: Rio Grande do Norte
- Mesoregion: Leste Potiguar

Population (2022)
  - Total: 13,251
- Time zone: UTC -3

Arês is a municipality in the state of Rio Grande do Norte in the Northeast region of Brazil. With an area of 115.407 square kilometers (44.559 sq mi), of which 2.728 square kilometres (1.053 sq mi) is urban, it is located 45 km from Natal, the state capital, and 1,755 km from Brasília, the federal capital. Its population in the 2022 demographic census was 13,251 inhabitants, according to the Brazilian Institute of Geography and Statistics (IBGE), ranking as the 40th most populous municipality in the state of Rio Grande do Norte.

== Geography ==
The territory of Arês covers 115.407 square kilometers (44.559 sq mi), of which 2.728 square kilometres (1.053 sq mi) constitutes the urban area. It sits at an average altitude of 52 meters above sea level. Arês borders these municipalities: to the north, Nísia Floresta and São José de Mipibu; to the south, Goianinha and Tibau do Sul; to the east, Senador Georgino Avelino and Tibau do Sul again; and to the west, São José de Mipibu and Goianinha. The city is located 45 km from the state capital Natal, and 1,755 km from the federal capital Brasília.

Under the territorial division established in 2017 by the Brazilian Institute of Geography and Statistics (IBGE), the municipality belongs to the immediate geographical region of Canguaretama, within the intermediate region of Natal. Previously, under the microregion and mesoregion divisions, it was part of the microregion of Litoral Sul in the mesoregion of Leste Potiguar.

== Demographics ==
In the 2022 census, the municipality had a population of 13,251 inhabitants and ranked only 40th in the state that year (out of 167 municipalities), with 50.74% female and 49.26% male, resulting in a sex ratio of 97.07 (9,707 men for every 10,000 women), compared to 12,924 inhabitants in the 2010 census (62.43% living in the urban area), when it held the 41st state position. Between the 2010 and 2022 censuses, the population of Arês changed at an annual geometric growth rate of 0.21%. Regarding age group in the 2022 census, 68.45% of the inhabitants were between 15 and 64 years old, 22.55% were under fifteen, and 9% were 65 or older. The population density in 2022 was 114.82 inhabitants per square kilometer, with an average of 3.1 inhabitants per household.

The municipality's Human Development Index (HDI-M) is considered medium, according to data from the United Nations Development Programme. According to the 2010 report published in 2013, its value was 0.606, ranking 86th in the state and 3,999th nationally (out of 5,565 municipalities), and the Gini coefficient rose from 0.39 in 2003 to 0.53 in 2010. Considering only the longevity index, its value is 0.725, the income index is 0.587, and the education index is 0.523.

== See also ==
- List of municipalities in Rio Grande do Norte
