= La Guiche =

- Commune
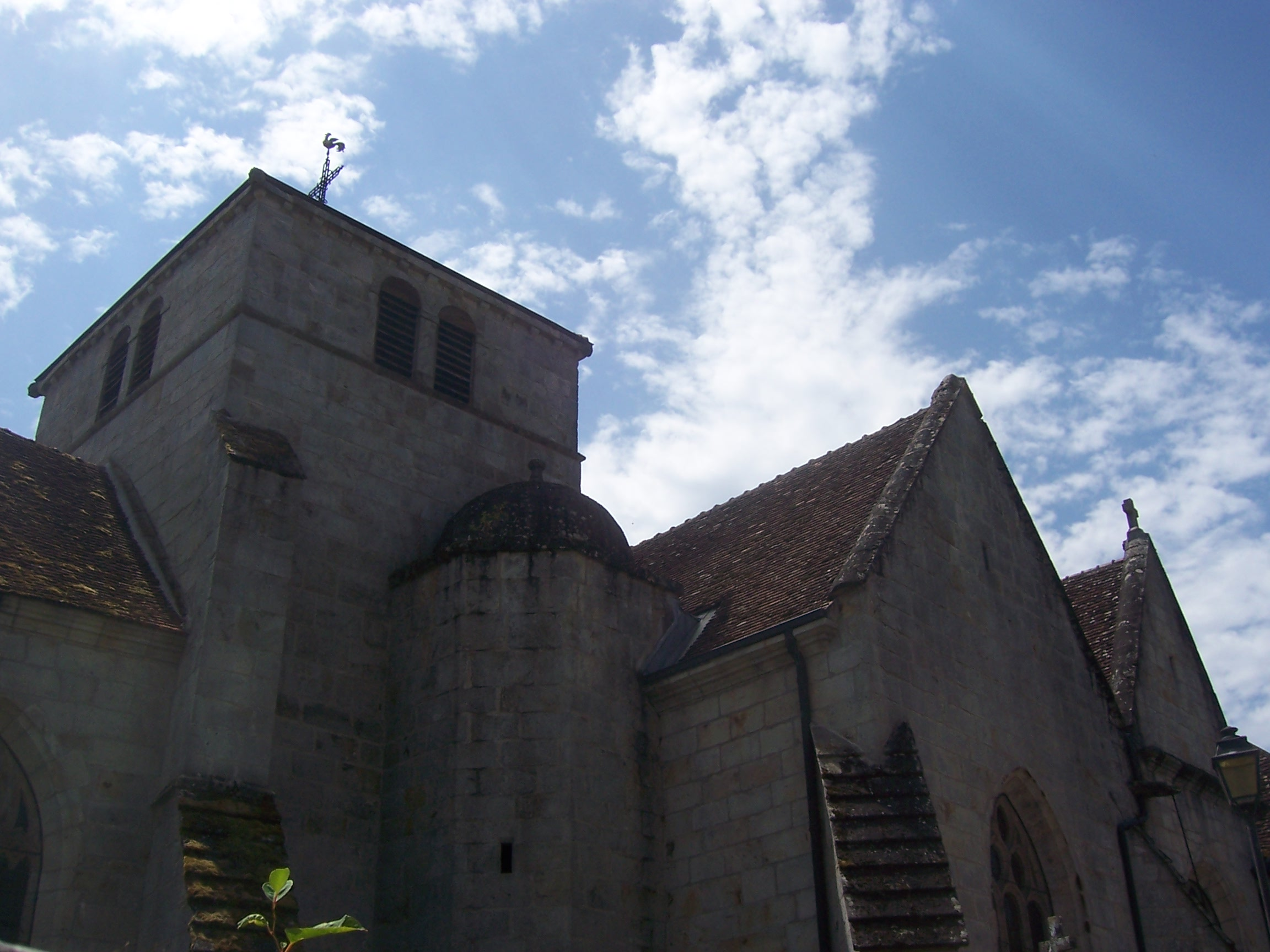
- The church in La Guiche

- Coat of arms
- Location of La Guiche
- Location within France Location within Bourgogne-Franche-Comté
- Coordinates: 46°32′45″N 4°27′07″E
- Country: France
- Region: Bourgogne-Franche-Comté
- Department: Saône-et-Loire
- Arrondissement: Mâcon
- Canton: Cluny
- Area^{1}: 27.77 km^{2} (10.72 sq mi)
- Elevation: 412 m (1,352 ft)
- Highest elevation: 469 m (1,539 ft)
- Lowest elevation: 332 m (1,089 ft)
- Population (2023): 594
  - Density: 21.4/km^{2} (55.4/sq mi)
- Time zone: UTC+01:00 (CET)
  - Summer (DST): UTC+02:00 (CEST)
- INSEE/Postal code: 71231 /71220
- ^{1} French Land Register data, which excludes lakes, ponds, glaciers > 1 km^{2} (0.386 sq mi or 247 acres) and river estuaries.

La Guiche (French pronunciation: [la ɡiʃ]) is a commune in the Saône-et-Loire department in the region of Bourgogne-Franche-Comté in central eastern France.

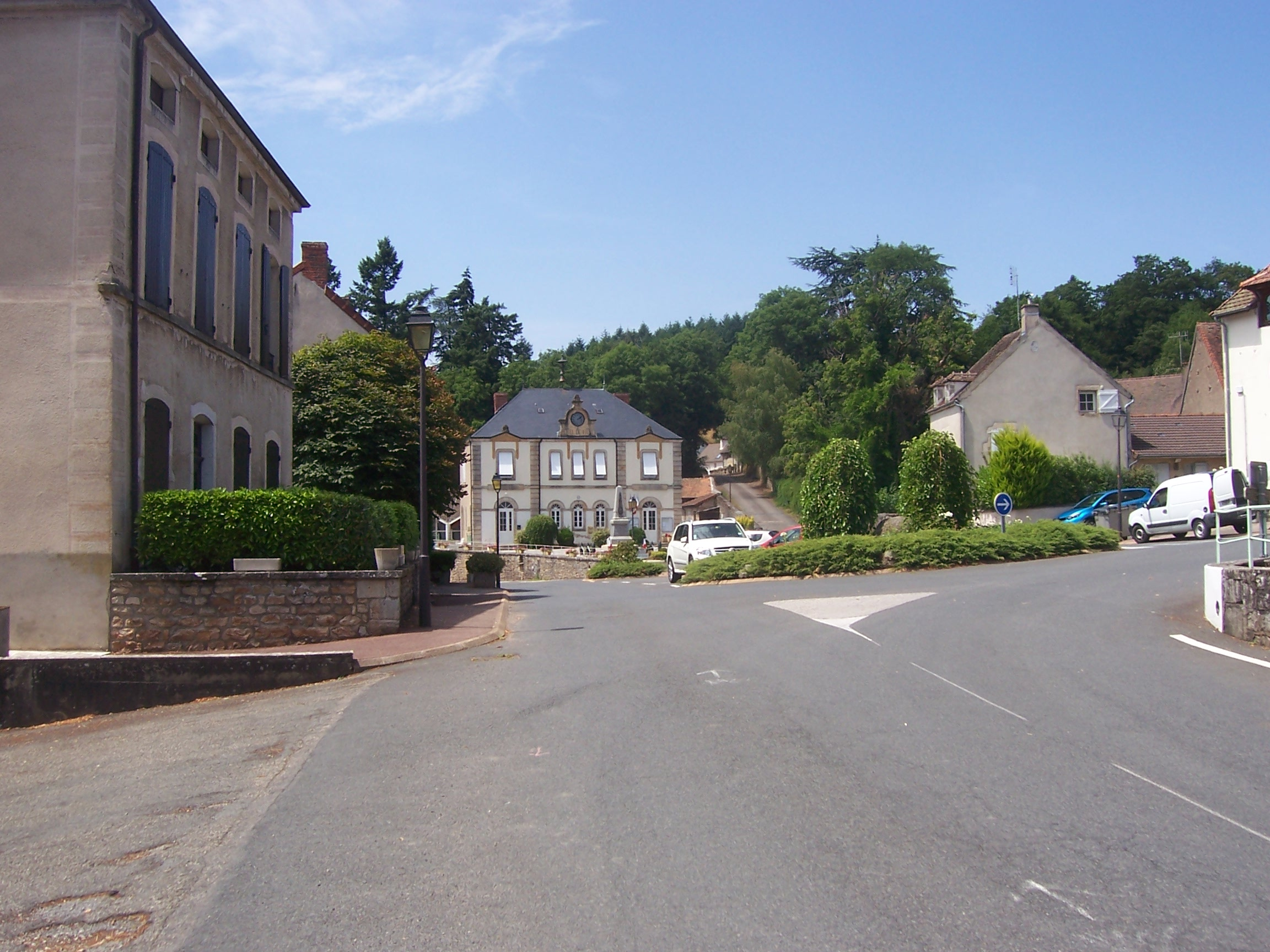
Town hall

== See also ==
- Communes of the Saône-et-Loire department
