= Batalhão Cemetery =

Historic cemetery site in Campo Maior, Piaui, Brazil

Coordinates: 4°46′59″S 42°07′05″W

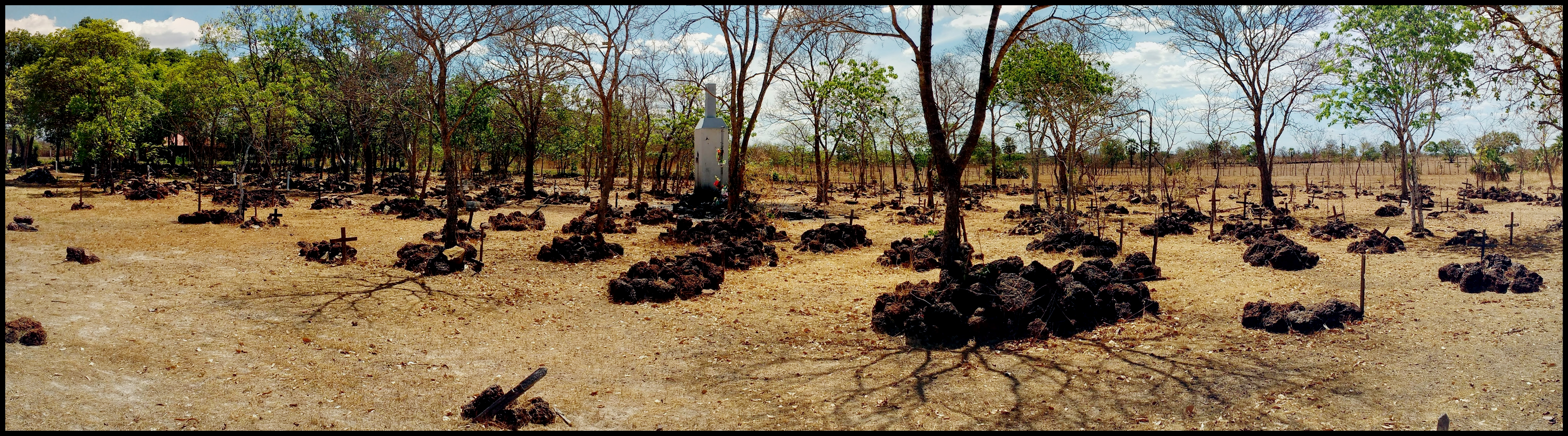
Batalhão Cemetery

Batalhão Cemetery is a cemetery located in the city of Campo Maior, Piauí, Brazil. It is a historical heritage site, listed in 1938 by the National Historic and Artistic Heritage Institute (Portuguese: Instituto do Patrimônio Histórico e Artístico Nacional, IPHAN) and named National Monument in 1990 by the president José Sarney.

The Batalhão cemetery, located in the municipality of Campo maior (PI), was listed by IPHAN in 1938 and has been registered in the Books of Listed Historical Sites and of Fine Arts. The cemetery, one of the most important landmarks in the history of Piauí and in the Independence of Brazil, is home to the remains of the heroes of the Battle of Jenipapo, which took place on March 13, 1823.
