= Mataraca =

Coordinates: 6°36′S 35°03′W

Mataraca, Paraíba-PB - Brazil
- Municipality
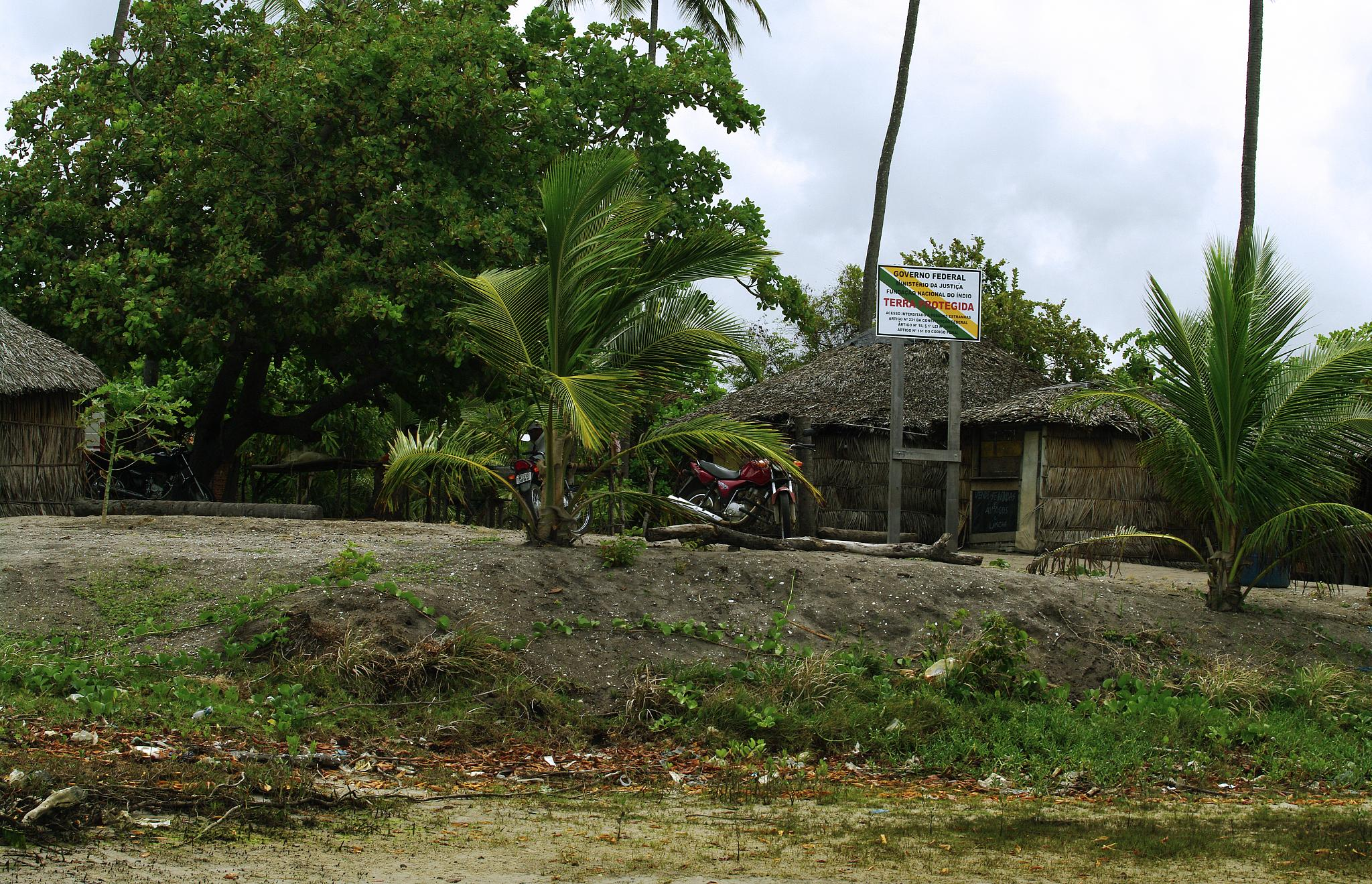

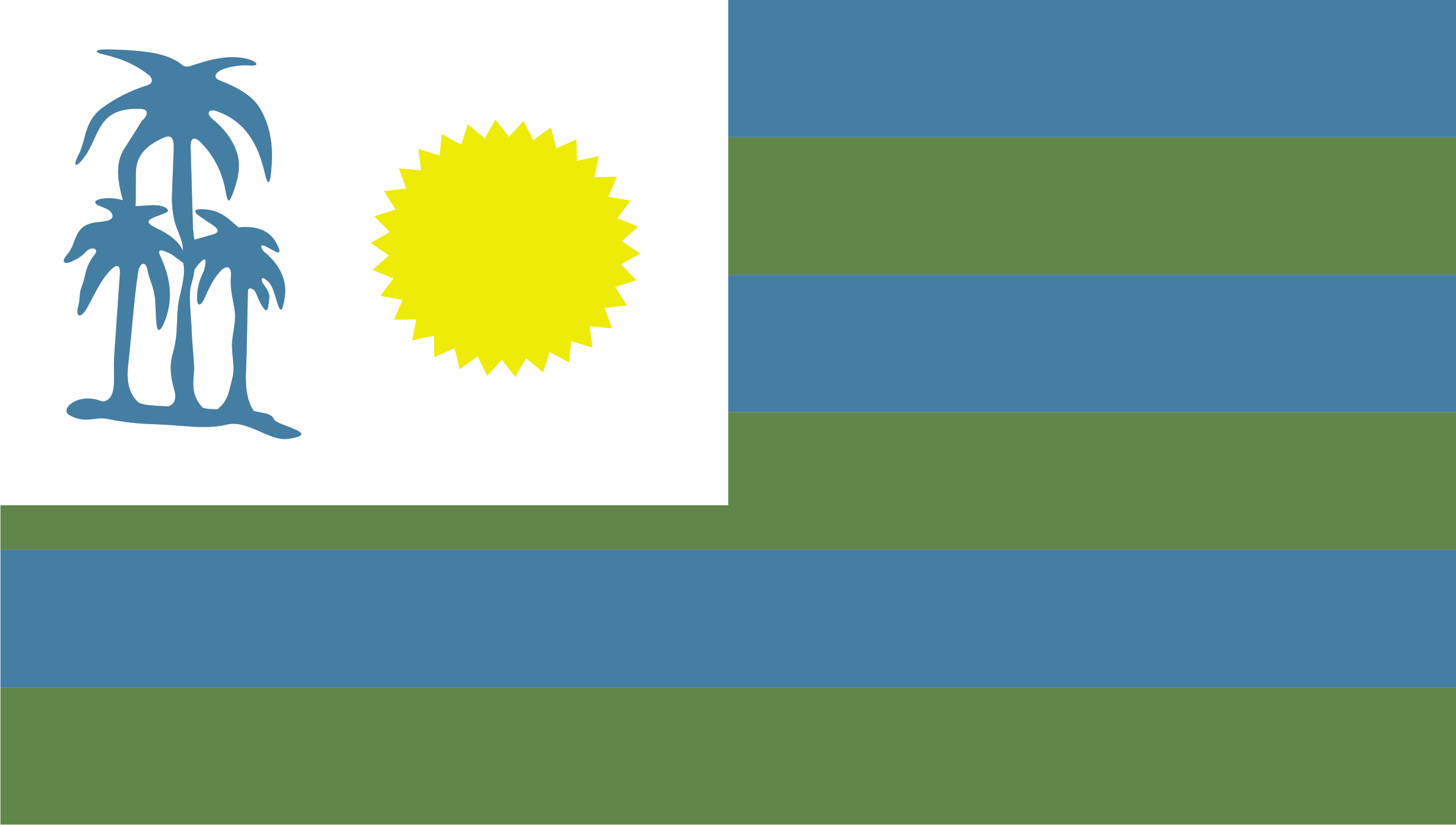
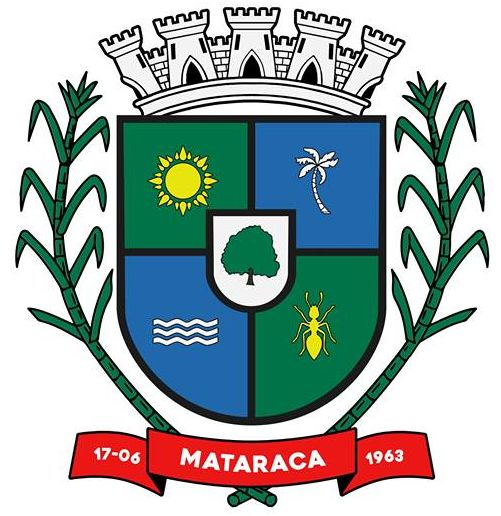
- Flag Coat of arms
- Interactive map of Mataraca, Paraíba-PB - Brazil
- Country: Brazil
- Region: South
- State: Paraíba
- Mesoregion: Mata Paraibana

Population (2020)
  - Total: 8,539
- Time zone: UTC−3 (BRT)

Mataraca is a municipality in the state of Paraíba in the Northeast Region of Brazil.

== See also ==
- List of municipalities in Paraíba
