= Montanhas =

Municipality in Rio Grande do Norte, Brazil

Coordinates: 6°29′S 35°18′W

- Municipality
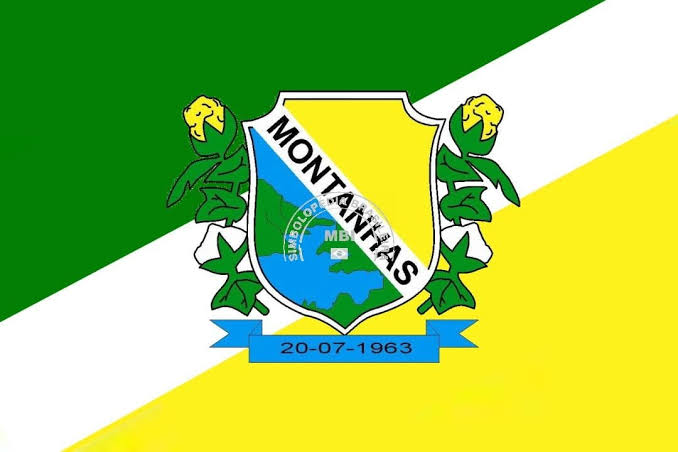
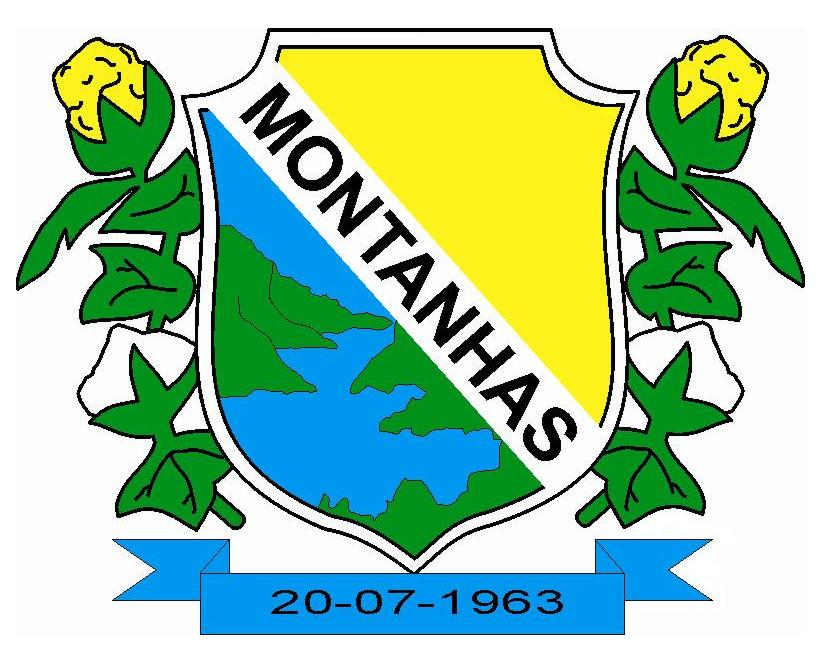
- Flag Coat of arms

- Location of Montanhas (red) in Rio Grande do Norte
- Country: Brazil
- Region: Nordeste
- State: Rio Grande do Norte
- Mesoregion: Leste Potiguar

Population (2020)
  - Total: 11,208
- Time zone: UTC−3 (BRT)

Montanhas is a municipality in the state of Rio Grande do Norte in the Northeast region of Brazil.

== See also ==
- List of municipalities in Rio Grande do Norte
