= Senador Georgino Avelino =

Municipality in Rio Grande do Norte, Brazil

Coordinates: 6.16278°S 35.1228°W

- Municipality
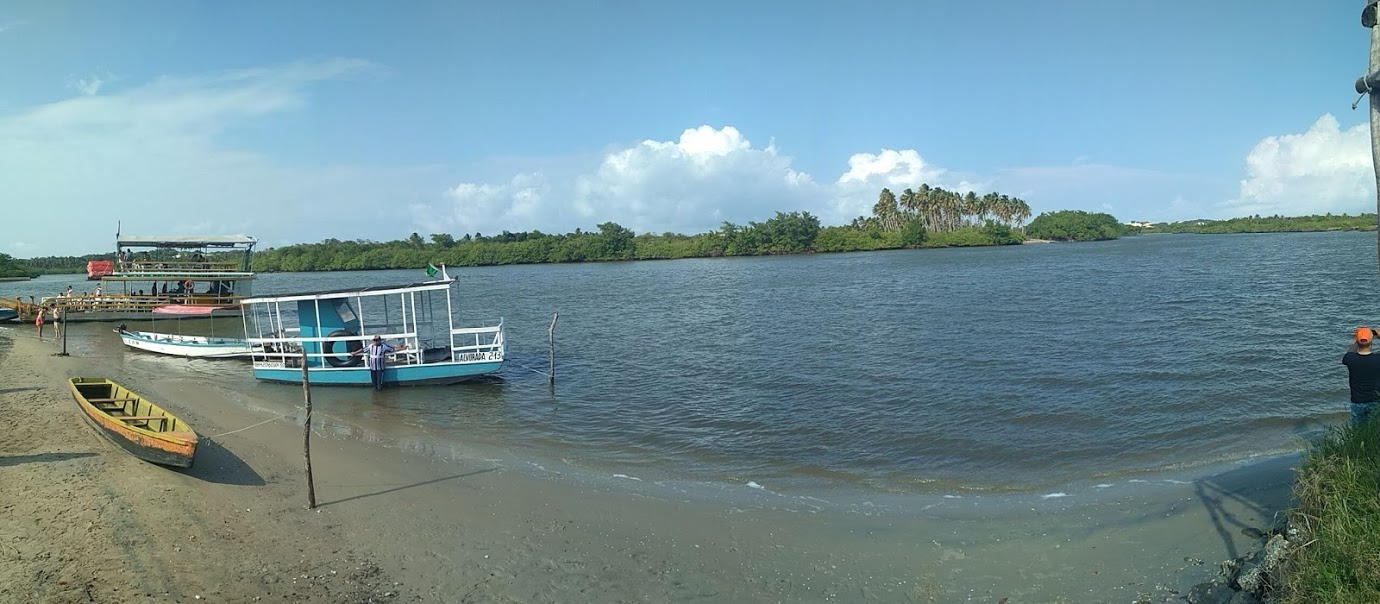

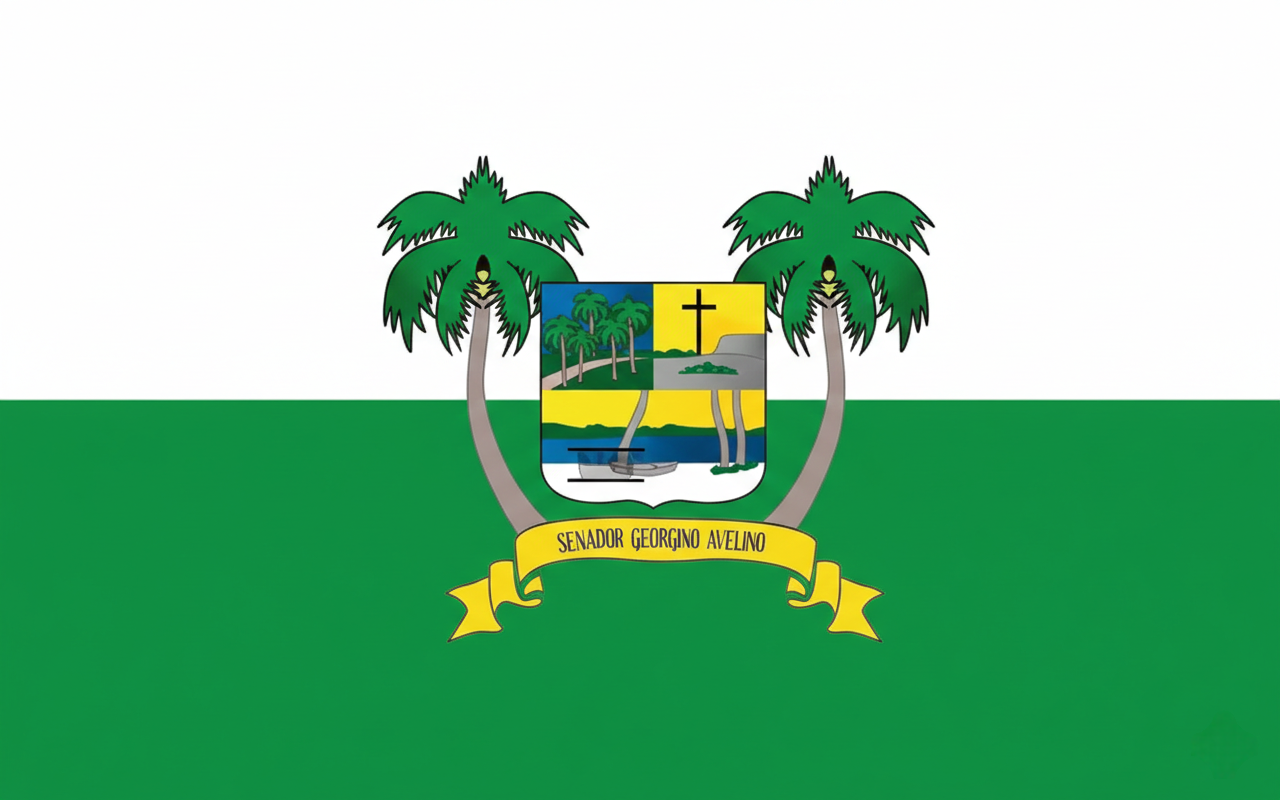
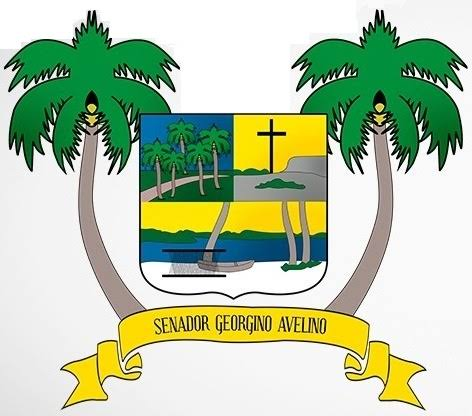
- Flag Coat of arms
- Interactive map of Senador Georgino Avelino
- Country: Brazil
- Region: Nordeste
- State: Rio Grande do Norte
- Mesoregion: Leste Potiguar

Population (2020)
  - Total: 4,484
- Time zone: UTC−3 (BRT)

Senador Georgino Avelino is a municipality in the state of Rio Grande do Norte in the Northeast region of Brazil.

== See also ==
- List of municipalities in Rio Grande do Norte
