= Tibau do Sul =

Municipality in Rio Grande do Norte, Brazil

- The Municipality of Tibau do Sul
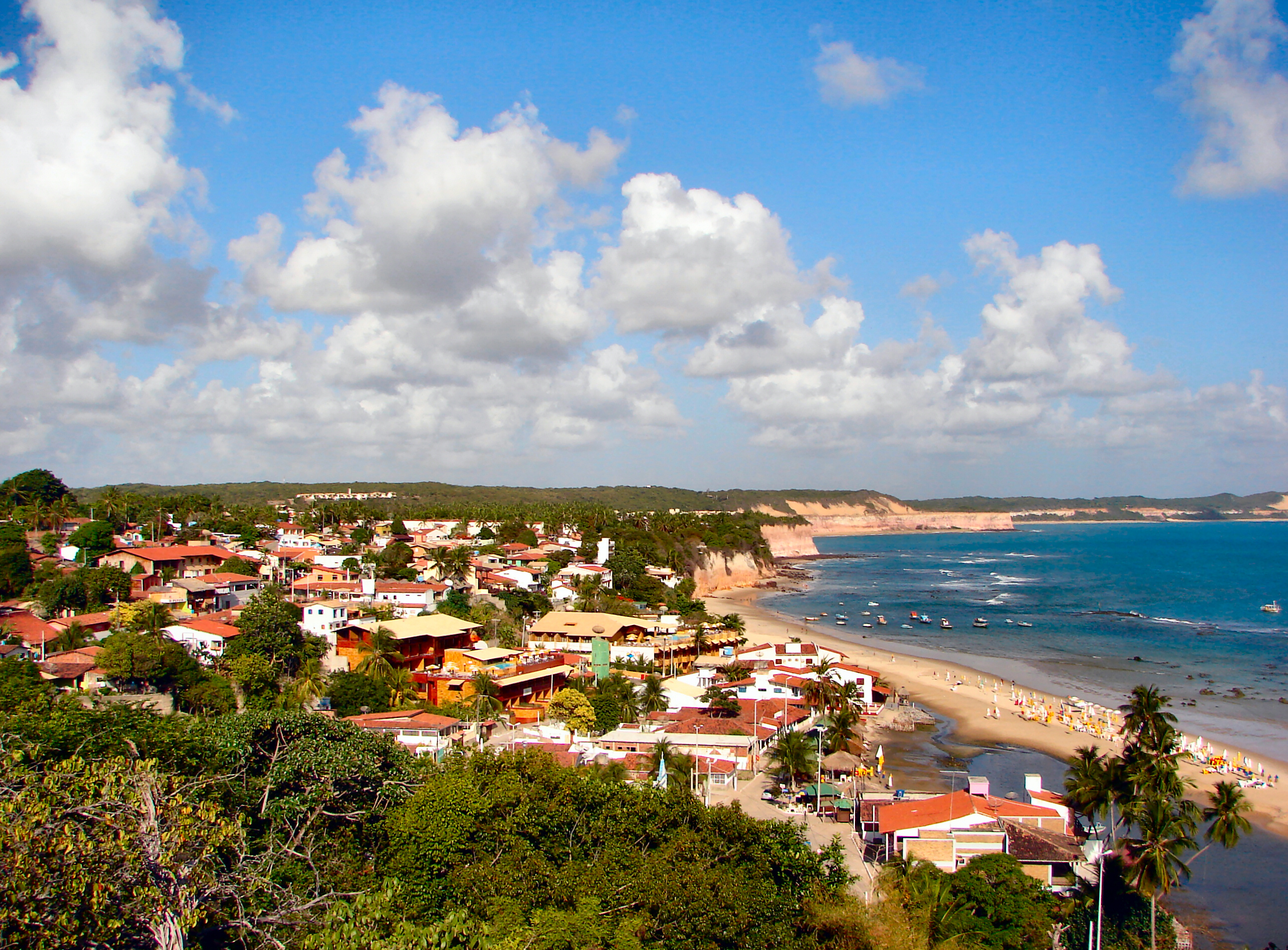
- Pipa beach

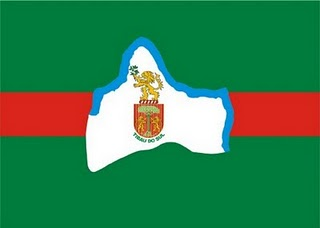
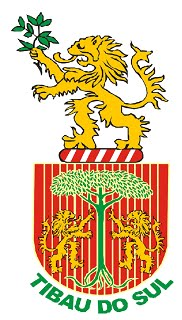
- Flag Coat of arms

- Location of Tibau do Sul in the State of Rio Grande do Norte

- Coordinates: 6.18694°S 35.0919°W
- Country: Brazil
- Region: Nordeste
- State: Rio Grande do Norte
- Mesoregion: Leste Potiguar

Population (2020)
  - Total: 14,440
- Time zone: UTC−3 (BRT)

Tibau do Sul is a municipality in the state of Rio Grande do Norte in the Northeast region of Brazil.

== See also ==
- List of municipalities in Rio Grande do Norte
