= Pedro Velho =

Municipality in Rio Grande do Norte, Brazil

Coordinates: 6.43889°S 35.2208°W

- Municipality
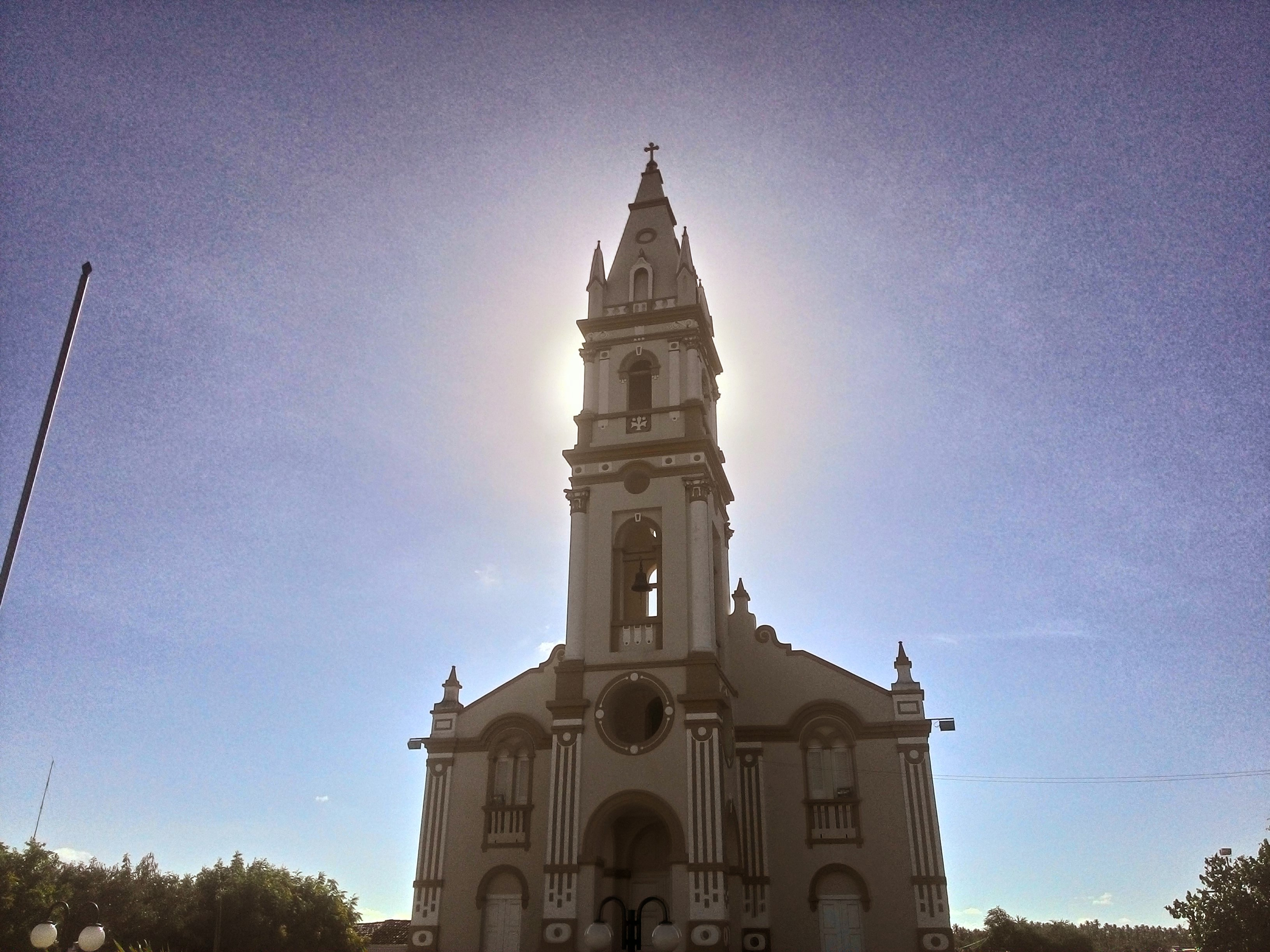
- Igreja Matriz de Pedro Velho

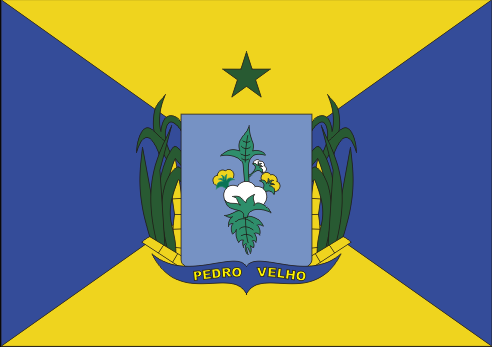
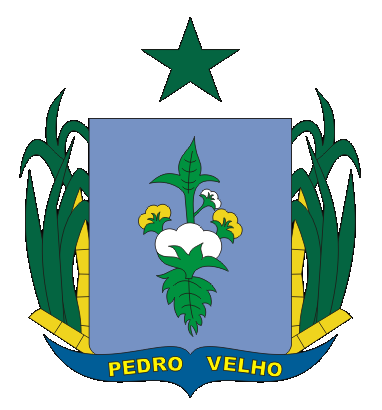
- Flag Coat of arms
- Interactive map of Pedro Velho
- Country: Brazil
- Region: Nordeste
- State: Rio Grande do Norte
- Mesoregion: Leste Potiguar

Population (2020)
  - Total: 14,844
- Time zone: UTC−3 (BRT)

Pedro Velho is a municipality in the state of Rio Grande do Norte in the Northeast region of Brazil.

== See also ==
- List of municipalities in Rio Grande do Norte
