= The Amazing Race: A Corrida Milionária =

Brazilian adventure reality game show

- Presented by: Rony Curvelo
- No. of teams: 11
- Winners: Patrícia & Sane
- No. of legs: 13
- Distance traveled: 15,000 km (9,300 mi)
- No. of episodes: 13

Release
- Original network: RedeTV!
- Original release: 13 October 2007 – 5 January 2008

Additional information
- Filming dates: 15 August – 17 September 2007

The Amazing Race: A Corrida Milionária (English: The Millionaire Race) was a Brazilian reality competition based on the American series The Amazing Race. Following the premise of other versions in the Amazing Race franchise, the show follows eleven teams of two with a grand prize of R$500,000. The show was split into legs, with teams tasked to deduce clues, navigate themselves in foreign areas, interact with locals, perform physical and mental challenges, and travel by air, boat, car, taxi, and other modes of transport. Teams are progressively eliminated at the end of most legs for being the last to arrive at designated Pit Stops. Starting in São Paulo, racers travelled through nine states of Brazil and one Federal District, and Chile before finishing in Dalcahue near Puerto Montt, resulting in the fewest countries visited in an Amazing Race franchise until The Amazing Race: China Rush.

The show was hosted by Rony Curvelo and independently produced and aired in a purchased time slot in the Brazilian television network RedeTV!. It premiered on 13 October 2007 and ended on 5 January 2008.

Friends Patricia & Sane were the winners, and friends Jonatas & Rafael placed second.

== Production ==
=== Development and filming ===
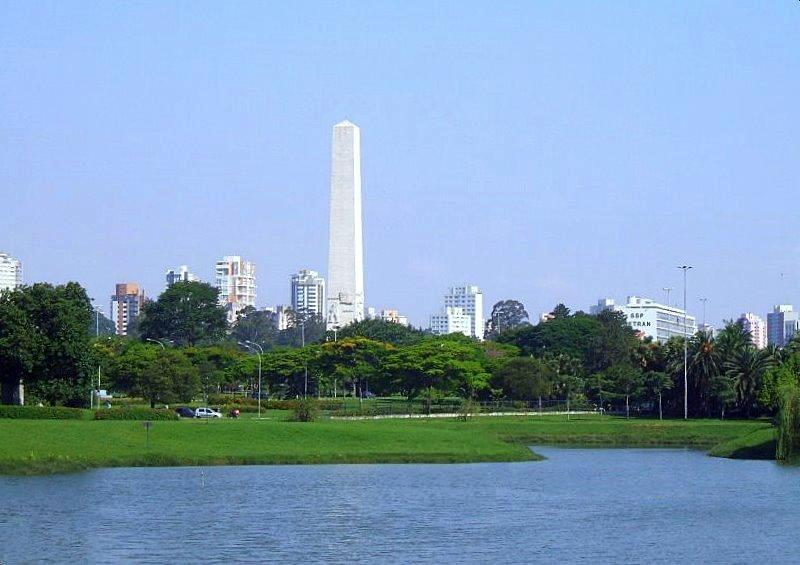
The Starting Line was at the Ibirapuera Park in São Paulo, Brazil.

The Amazing Race: A Corrida Milionária covered 15,000 kilometres (9,300 mi) in 33 days.

The series adopted the rules from the American version's tenth and eleventh seasons. With the exception of the Intersection, all clue types were retained in the Brazilian version, as well as the non-elimination penalty. This show also differed from the original format in that while teams leave the Pit Stops in the same order they arrived, the time differences were not always respected. The penalty for not completing a Roadblock was also shorter at three hours compared to four. Route markers are colored yellow and green, reflecting the Brazilian national colours, as opposed to yellow and red in most other versions. Also, contrary to other Amazing Race versions, the eliminated teams did not make an appearance at the Finish Line. Additionally, this is the first Amazing Race franchise whereby they did not end in the same country as it started as the season started in Brazil and ended in Chile. In most versions, the seasons start and end in same country.

Notably, in Leg 6, while driving to the Pit Stop, Andréa & Luciana were held up at gunpoint by three men at a stoplight in Fortaleza. The team did not lose anything, but the criminals took the camera and all personal documents from the crew, and ran off as gunshots were fired by the police. Two of the men were later caught and identified, and the camera was recovered. This incident dropped the team from 4th to last place, and no time credit was given for the situation. Part of the robbery was filmed and shown in the sixth episode. In Leg 13, Perri & Maristela became the first team to quit the show in a final leg, after refusing to perform the first task.

== Contestants ==
Applications for the first season were open from January until July 2007, and filming occurred in South America during August and September. Narciso & Marcelo are the first openly gay couple to participate in a Brazilian reality show. While Eduardo previously participated in the Brazilian reality game show Sem Saída, in which he won R$50,000.

Contestants	Age	Relationship	Hometown	Status
Sandro	28	Cousins	Rio de Janeiro, Rio de Janeiro	Eliminated 1st (in Petrópolis, Rio de Janeiro)
Daniel	23	Cousins	Rio de Janeiro, Rio de Janeiro	Eliminated 1st (in Petrópolis, Rio de Janeiro)
Narciso	31	Life Partners	Belém, Pará	Eliminated 2nd (in Santa Bárbara, Minas Gerais)
Marcelo	41	Life Partners	Belém, Pará	Eliminated 2nd (in Santa Bárbara, Minas Gerais)
Carlos	46	Father & Son	São Paulo, São Paulo	Eliminated 3rd (in Jequiá da Praia, Alagoas)
Eduardo	24	Father & Son	São Paulo, São Paulo	Eliminated 3rd (in Jequiá da Praia, Alagoas)
Mari Lice	40	Mother & Daughter	Novo Hamburgo, Rio Grande do Sul	Eliminated 4th (in Natal, Rio Grande do Norte)
Tâmisa	23	Mother & Daughter	Novo Hamburgo, Rio Grande do Sul	Eliminated 4th (in Natal, Rio Grande do Norte)
Milene	30	Friends	São Paulo, São Paulo	Eliminated 5th (in Iranduba, Amazonas)
Jaqueline	31	Friends	São Paulo, São Paulo	Eliminated 5th (in Iranduba, Amazonas)
Andréa de Carvalho	33	Sisters	São Paulo, São Paulo	Eliminated 6th (in Planaltina, Distrito Federal)
Luciana de Carvalho	31	Sisters	São Paulo, São Paulo	Eliminated 6th (in Planaltina, Distrito Federal)
Débora	28	Sisters	Brasília, Distrito Federal	Eliminated 7th (in Foz do Iguaçu, Paraná)
Daniela	30	Sisters	Brasília, Distrito Federal	Eliminated 7th (in Foz do Iguaçu, Paraná)
Jorge	56	Married	Brotas, São Paulo	Eliminated 8th (in Vitacura, Chile)
Silvia	39	Married	Brotas, São Paulo	Eliminated 8th (in Vitacura, Chile)
Perri	44	Married	Aracaju, Sergipe	Quit (in Puerto Montt, Chile)
Maristela	35	Married	Aracaju, Sergipe	Quit (in Puerto Montt, Chile)
Jonatas Guedes	23	Friends	São Paulo, São Paulo	Second Place
Rafael	23	Friends	São Paulo, São Paulo	Second Place
Patrícia	29	Friends	São Paulo, São Paulo	Winners
Sane	33	Friends	São Paulo, São Paulo	Winners

== Results ==
The following teams are listed with their placements in each leg. Placements are listed in finishing order.

- A red placement with a dagger (†) indicates that the team was eliminated.
- An underlined blue placement with a double-dagger (‡) indicates that the team was the last to arrive at a Pit Stop in a non-elimination leg and was "marked for elimination" in the following leg. (Note: A team that is "marked for elimination" must check in at the Pit Stop in first place; otherwise they would receive a 30-minute penalty.)
- A green ƒ indicates that the team won the Fast Forward.

Team placement (by leg)
Team	1	2	3	4	5	6	7	8	9	10	11	12	13
Patrícia & Sane	3rd	4th	2nd	5th	4th	3rd	5th	3rd	4th	3rd	1st	2nd	1st
Jonatas & Rafael	2nd	1st (Note: Jonatas & Rafael were issued a 25-minute penalty on site while on the way to the Pit Stop because their taxi driver was speeding.)	9th‡	1st	2nd	2nd	4th	2ndƒ (Note: This team won the Fast Forward on this leg.)	3rd	4th	3rd	3rd	2nd
Perri & Maristela	1st	3rd	4th	4th	3rd	1st	1st	4th	1st	2nd	2nd	1st	† (Note: Perri & Maristela were disqualified midway during the final leg after quitting the clam eating task.)
Jorge & Silvia	5th (Note: For unknown reasons on the subsequent leg, the starting placements of Jorge & Silvia and Milene & Jaqueline were switched, resulting in Jorge & Silvia and Milene & Jaqueline starting in 5th and 4th place. respectively.)	7th	5th	7th	5th (Note: Jorge & Silvia and Milene & Jaqueline initially arrived 4th and 5th, respectively, but both teams were issued 25-minute penalties as both teams took an illegal shortcut by driving in the wrong direction on a one-way street. They served their penalties at the start of Leg 6, and departed in 5th and 6th, respectively.)	5th	3rd	5th	2nd	1stƒ	4th‡	4th† (Note: Jorge & Silvia initially arrived 3rd, but were issued a 30-minute penalty for being "marked for elimination" and not arriving 1st. Jonatas & Rafael checked in during their penalty time, dropping Jorge & Silvia to last.)	
Débora & Daniela	8th	5th	7th	3rd	7th	4th	2nd	1st	5th‡	5th†			
Andréa & Luciana	9th	8th	6th	6th	1st	7th‡	6th (Note: Andréa & Luciana initially arrived 5th, but were issued a 30-minute penalty for being "marked for elimination" and not arriving 1st. Patrícia & Sane checked in during their penalty time, dropping Andréa & Luciana to 6th.)	6th†					
Milene & Jaqueline	4th	2nd	8th	8th	6th	6th	7th†						
Mari Lice & Tâmisa	6th	6th	3rd	2nd	8th†								
Carlos & Eduardo	7th	9th	1stƒ	9th†									
Narciso & Marcelo	10th	10th†											
Sandro & Daniel	11th†												

== Race summary ==
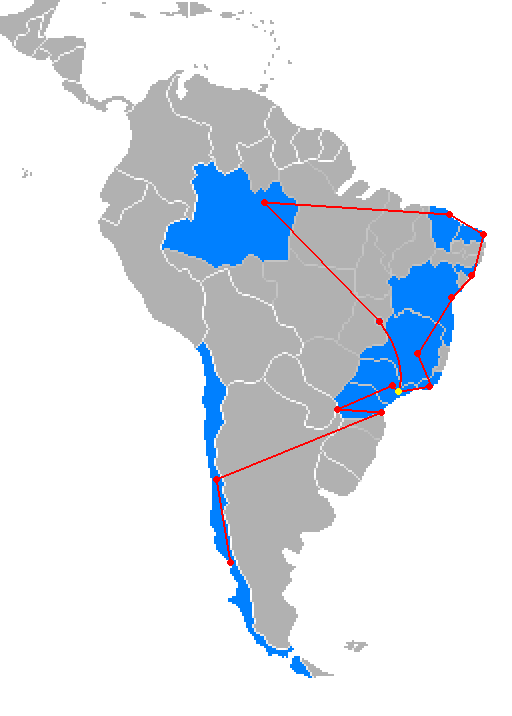
Route Map. The yellow point represents the starting location in Leg 1, as well as the transfer point for Leg 9.

Destinations	Air travel Rail travel Water travel Bus travel Helicopter travel Bicycle travel Gondola travel
Route Markers	Desvio (Detour) Obstáculo (Roadblock) Passe Livre (Fast Forward); Passe de Espera (Yield) Pit Stop

=== Leg 1 (São Paulo → Rio de Janeiro) ===
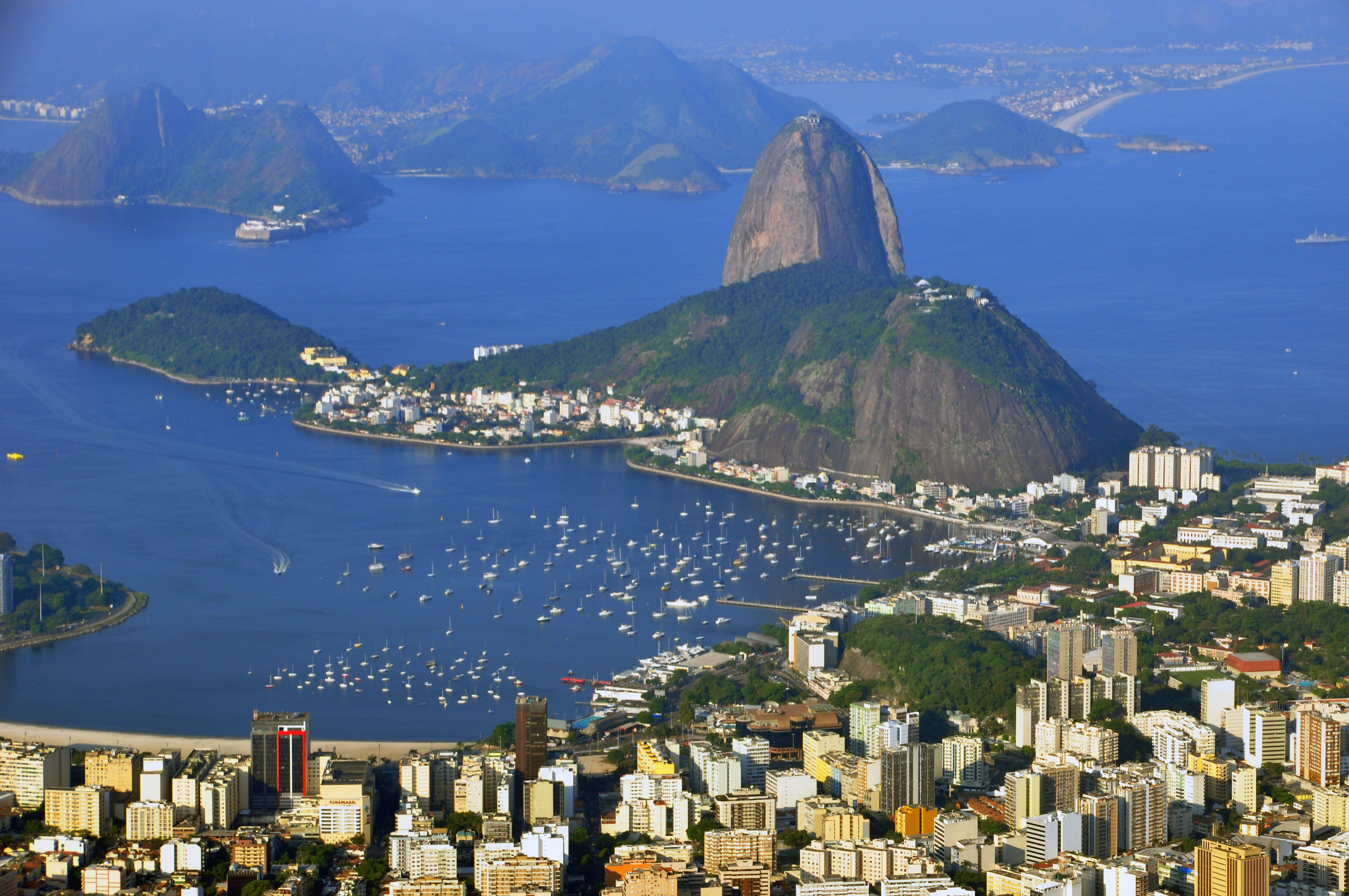
Teams visited the famous Morro da Urca in the city of Rio de Janeiro overlooking Guanabara Bay.

- Episode 1 (13 October 2007)
- Prize: A trip for two to Buenos Aires, Argentina (awarded to Perri & Maristela)
- Eliminated: Sandro & Daniel

Locations

- São Paulo, São Paulo (Ibirapuera Park) (Starting Line)
- São Paulo (São Paulo–Congonhas Airport) → Rio de Janeiro, Rio de Janeiro (Santos Dumont Airport)
- Rio de Janeiro (Morro da Urca)
- Rio de Janeiro (Morro da Urca or Santa Teresa Neighborhood)
- Rio de Janeiro (Corcovado)
- Rio de Janeiro (Praça XV – Mestre Valentim Fountain)
- Guanabara Bay (Rio de Janeiro–Niterói Ferry)
- Rio de Janeiro (Terminal Rodoviário Novo Rio) → Petrópolis
- Petrópolis (Palácio Quitandinha)
- Petrópolis (Palácio de Cristal (in Portuguese))
- Petrópolis (Pousada da Alcobaça)

Episode summary

- Teams set off from Ibirapuera Park in São Paulo, where they had to get their next clue and instructed them to fly to Rio de Janeiro. Once there, teams had to travel to Morro da Urca and take a cable car to get their next clue from the top of the mountain.
- This series' first Detour was a choice between Adventure (Aventurar) or Search (Procurar). In Adventure, teams had to rappel down from the top of Morro Da Urca and descend below to the ground in order to receive their next clue. In Search, teams had to take a Santa Teresa Tram ride and then disembark at Laurinda Santos Lobo Cultural Center to locate a man with a group of musicians who would hand them their next clue.
- After the Detour, teams had to travel to Corcovado and ride a train atop on the base of the mountain for their next clue right across Christ the Redeemer, which directed them to Praça XV and searched their next clue along Mestre Valentim Fountain, that would lead them to Guanabara Bay, where they had to board a ferry and search among hundreds of passengers inside for someone named Shimiko, without knowing to identify his gender, ethnicity or age. Once they found him, he would hand them their next clue.
- Teams had to take a bus to Petrópolis with 30-minute schedule intervals. Once there, teams had to travel to Palácio Quitandinha and grab a number for one of three departure times the next morning, where they would grab their next clue, they had to take a horse carriage ride to Palácio de Cristal in order from their departure times. Once there, they would grab their next clue, where directing them to Pousada da Alcobaça.
- In this series' first Roadblock, one team member had to correctly identify five specific vegetables patches with names of vegetables and place at the specific order in order to receive their next clue, and directing them to run to the Pit Stop nearby.

=== Leg 2 (Rio de Janeiro → Minas Gerais) ===
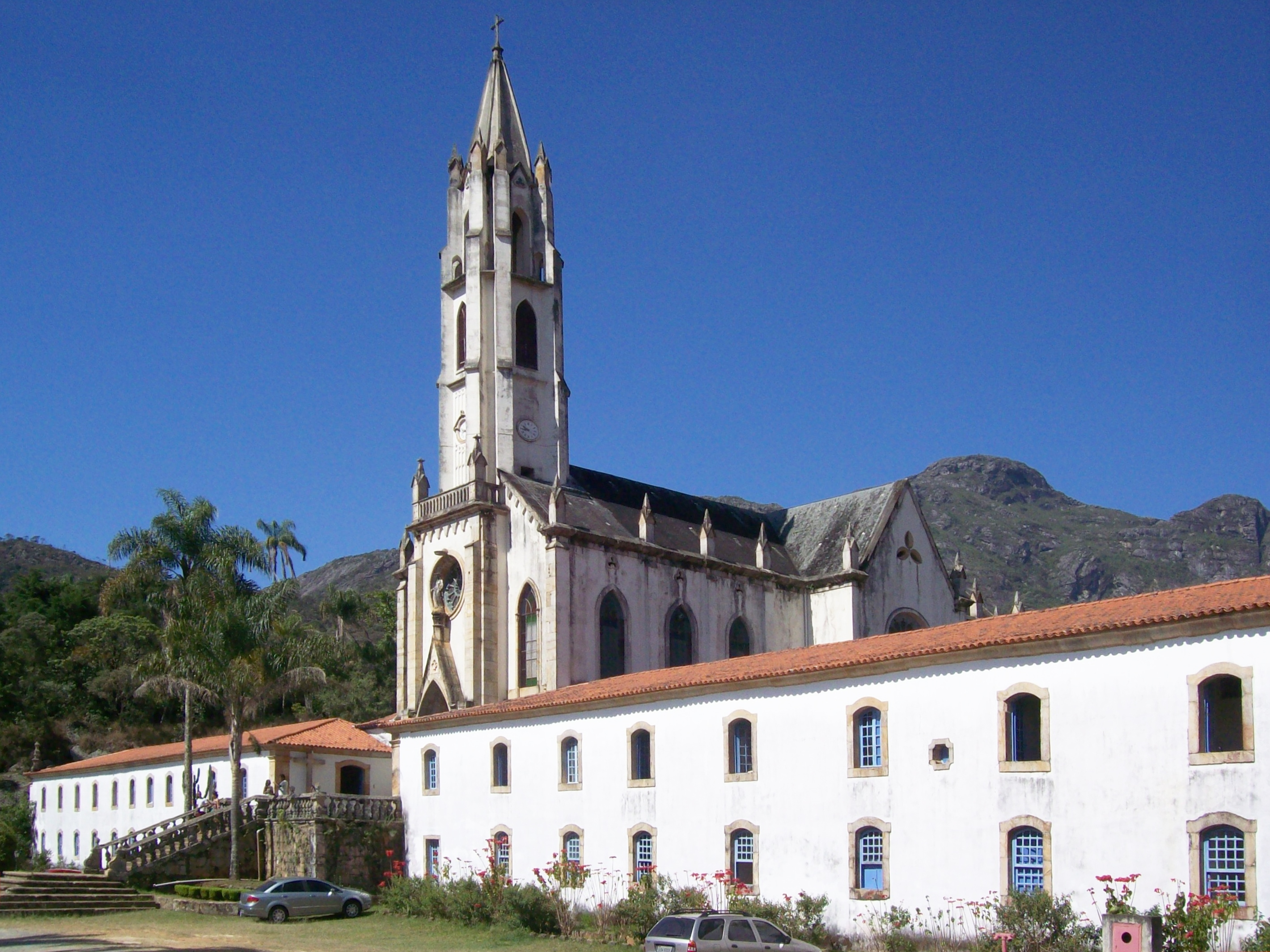
Teams finished the leg at Igreja Nossa Senhora Mãe dos Homens in Santa Bárbara.

- Episode 2 (20 October 2007)
- Prize: A trip for two to Salvador (awarded to Jonatas & Rafael)
- Eliminated: Marcelo & Narciso

Locations

- Petrópolis (Pousada da Alcobaça)
- Petrópolis (Shopping Plaza) → Ouro Preto, Minas Gerais (Praça Tiradentes (in Portuguese))
- Ouro Preto (Museu da Inconfidência)
- Ouro Preto (Mina de Santa Rita)
- Mariana (Train Station)
- Mariana (Mina da Passagem (in Portuguese))
- Santa Bárbara (Santuário do Caraça (in Portuguese) – Igreja Nossa Senhora Mãe dos Homens)

Episode summary

- At the start of the leg, teams had to take one of three buses to Ouro Preto leaving within thirty minutes at each other. Once there, teams travelled to Praça Tiradentes and search the Tiradentes Statue for their next clue, directed them to Museu da Inconfidência where they had to pick up 14 flowers from the florist shop and commemorate each martyr of the Inconfidência Mineira buried in the museum, and placed the flowers onto the grave. The guard would give them a map, that had to figure out locating their next destination, which is at Mina de Santa Rita, and get their next clue.
- In this leg's Roadblock, one team member had to enter the deepest part of mine. There, they must use the provided tools to excavate the area for dirt and materials, and place it into the sack. They had returned to the entrance and use a pan through their materials from the nearby pond, searching for a gold nugget and present it to the miner, who would exchange for their next clue.
- After the Roadblock, teams had to either take a train or bus to Mariana. Once there, they had to arrive in the historic train station and they would get their next clue.
- This leg's Detour was a choice between Tie (Atar) or Dodge (Desviar). In Tie, teams had to observe a demonstration of six knots being tied. Using a reference from the tied knots, they would have to do on their own before they would receive their next clue. In Dodge, teams had to run through a paintball field while being hit by paintball snipers. If the team member is hit, they would have to start over. Once they proceed without being hit and retrieve a flag at the other end to exchange for their next clue.
- After the Detour, teams were instructed to travel to the Pit Stop: Igreja Nossa Senhora Mãe dos Homens in Santuário do Caraça in Santa Barbara.

=== Leg 3 (Minas Gerais → Bahia) ===
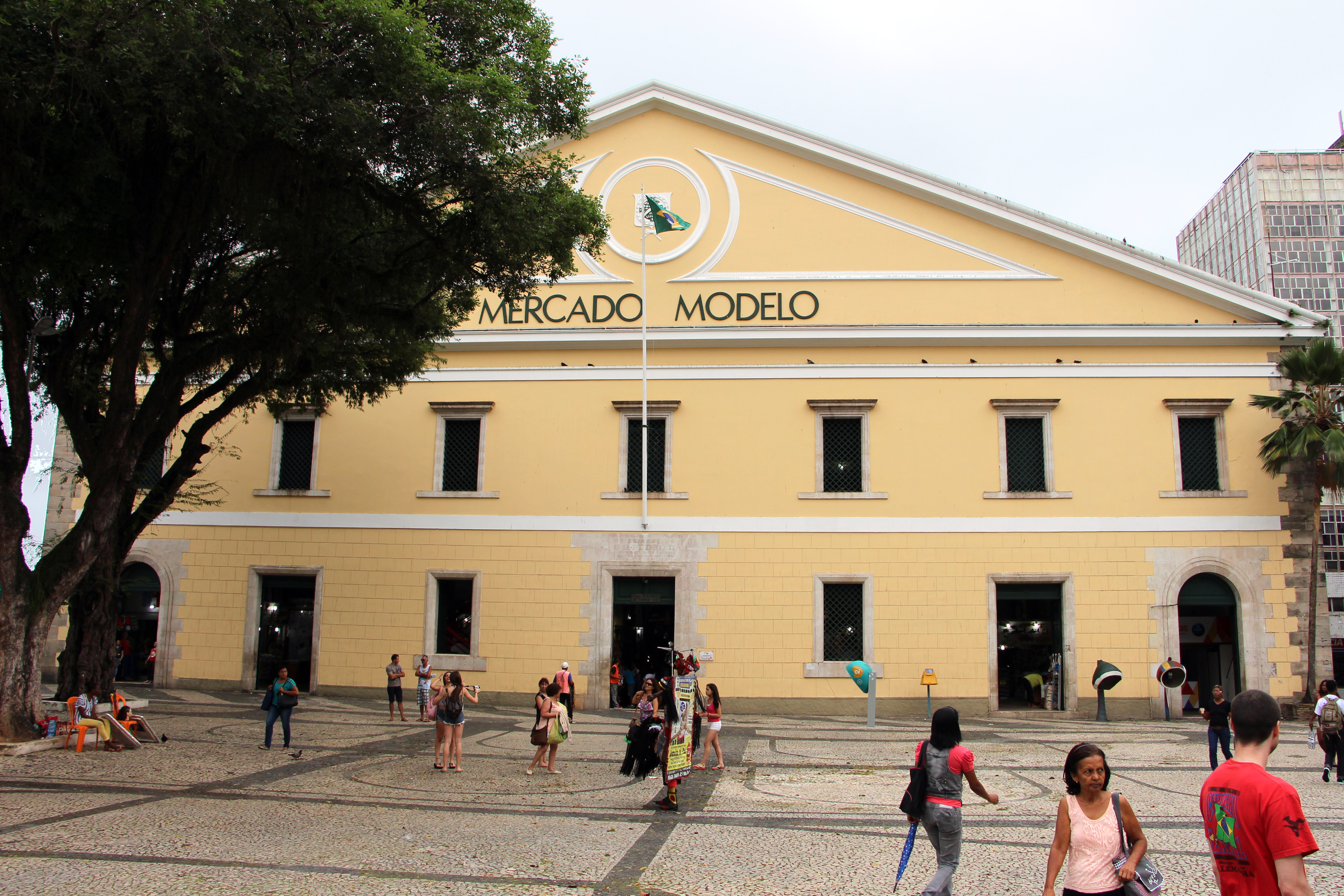
The Mercado Modelo in Salvador’s historic center was the focal point of this leg's Roadblock.

- Episode 3 (27 October 2007)
- Prize: A trip for two to Natal (awarded to Carlos & Eduardo)

Locations

- Santa Bárbara (Santuário do Caraça (in Portuguese) – Igreja Nossa Senhora Mãe dos Homens)
- Belo Horizonte (Tancredo Neves International Airport) → Salvador, Bahia (Deputado Luís Eduardo Magalhães International Airport)
- Salvador (Largo do Pelourinho (in Portuguese))
  - Salvador (Terreiro de Candomblé Tira-Teima)
- Salvador (Elevador Lacerda and Mercado Modelo)
- Salvador (Mercado Modelo and Praça da Sé (in Portuguese))
- Salvador (Farol da Barra)
- Salvador (Praça 15 de Novembro)
- Salvador (Filhos de Ghandy Cultural Center or Largo de Santo Antônio)
- Salvador (Convento do Carmo (in Portuguese))

Episode summary

- At the start of the leg, teams were instructed to fly to Salvador. Once there, teams had to make their way to Largo do Pelourinho, where they would get their next clue.
- In this series’ first Fast Forward, one team had to take part in a Candomblé ritual by having each member shave their heads and make a hair offering to the orishas to win the Fast Forward award. Carlos & Eduardo won the Fast Forward.
- Teams who did not choose the Fast Forward where they had to travel by foot to Elevador Lacerda and locate Mercado Modelo to find their next clue.
- In this leg's Roadblock, one team member search inside the market that were the four food items from the lyrics of Ary Barroso's song "No Tabuleiro da Baiana": vatapá, carurú, munguzá, and umbú. Once they have picked up those, they must pass through Elevador Lacerda and purchase these items, then present them to the baiana food stand at the Praça da Sé in order to receive their next clue.
- After the Roadblock, teams were instructed to travel to Farol da Barra, directing them to Praça 15 de Novembro, where they would get their next clue.
- This leg's Detour was a choice between Dress (Vestir) or Walk (Andar). In Dress, teams had to find the Filhos de Ghandy Cultural Center and choose a mannequin, where they would have to put an orisha costume, using a photograph for reference in order to receive their next clue. In Walk, teams had to walk by foot to Largo de Santo Antônio and find a capoeira circle where they would receive their next clue from the leader.
- After the Detour, teams had to check in at the Pit Stop: Convento do Carmo.

Additional notes

- All teams (except Carlos & Eduardo, who took the Fast Forward) were issued 30-minute penalty as they completed the Roadblock with both team members. Each of the performance in the Roadblock does not count in the tally.
- Teams encountered the series’ first Yield at Praça 15 de Novembro, but none of the teams to use the Yield.
- This was a non-elimination leg.

=== Leg 4 (Bahia → Alagoas) ===
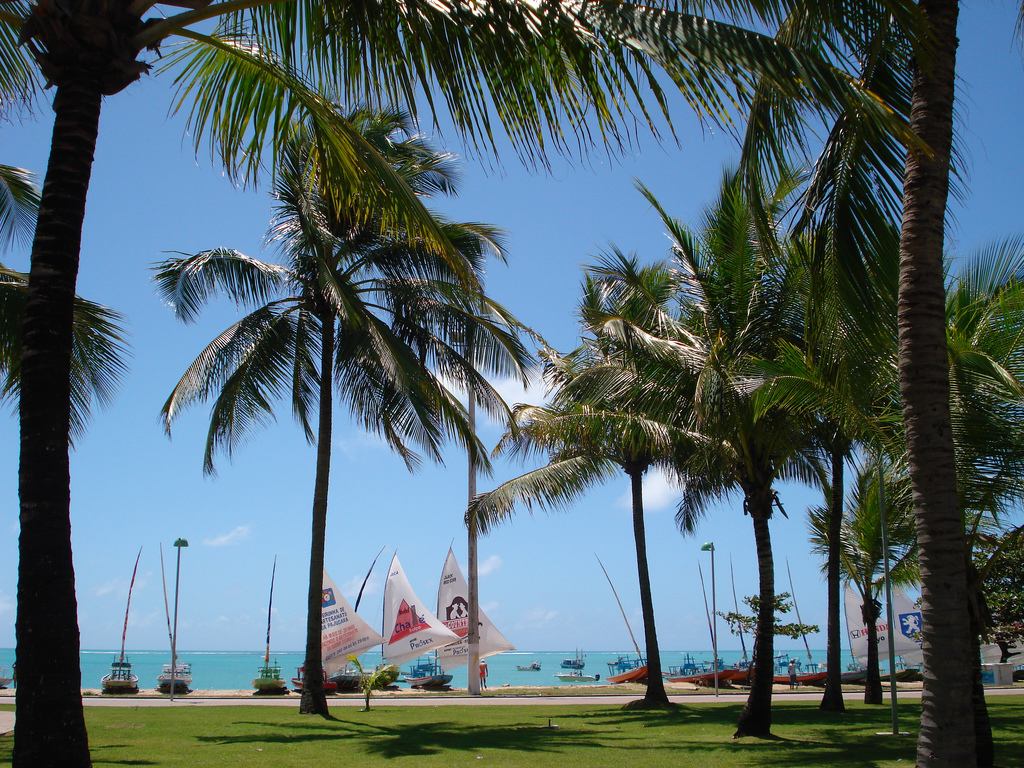
While in the province of Alagoas, teams visited Pajuçara beach in Maceió.

- Episode 4 (3 November 2007)
- Prize: A trip for two to Rio de Janeiro (awarded to Jonatas & Rafael)
- Eliminated: Carlos & Eduardo

Locations

- Salvador (Convento do Carmo)
- Salvador (Deputado Luís Eduardo Magalhães International Airport) → Maceió, Alagoas (Zumbi dos Palmares International Airport)
- Maceió (Pajuçara)
- Maceió (Monumento dos Marechais)
- Marachal Deodoro (Recanto do Paraíso)
- Piaçabuçu (São Francisco River Estuary)
- Penedo (Igreja de Nossa Senhora da Corrente)
- Jequiá da Praia (Dunas de Marapé (in Portuguese))

Episode summary

- At the start of the leg, teams instructed to fly to Maceió. Once there, teams choose a marked car and make their way to Pajuçara, where they had to find a large array of sand piles and dig through to get their next clue, instructing them to travel to Monumento dos Merchais to locate their next clue, directing them to Recanto do Paraíso at Marachal Deodoro.
- In this leg's Roadblock, one team member had to reach a tank filled with live mangrove crabs and must unload 10 crabs to a specific basket before retrieving their next clue.
- After the Roadblock, teams instructed to drive themselves to São Francisco River Estuary in Piaçabuçu. Once there, they had to take a motor boat ride along the river and find a marked boat in order to receive their next clue. The clue directed them to Igreja de Nossa Senhora da Corrente, where they had to search the entire church for a secret passageway used to hide slaves in the past to find their next clue.
- This leg's Detour was a choice between Decipher (Decifrar) or Break (Quebrar). In Decipher, teams would have had to receive a phrase from archaic Portuguese and must translate a message, that would direct them to a monument nearby to locate their next clue. In Break, teams had to break clay pot lids and find a miniature clue baked inside from thousands of pots. All teams chose Break.
- After the Detour, teams had to drive themselves to check in at the Pit Stop: Dunas de Marapé.

=== Leg 5 (Alagoas → Rio Grande do Norte) ===
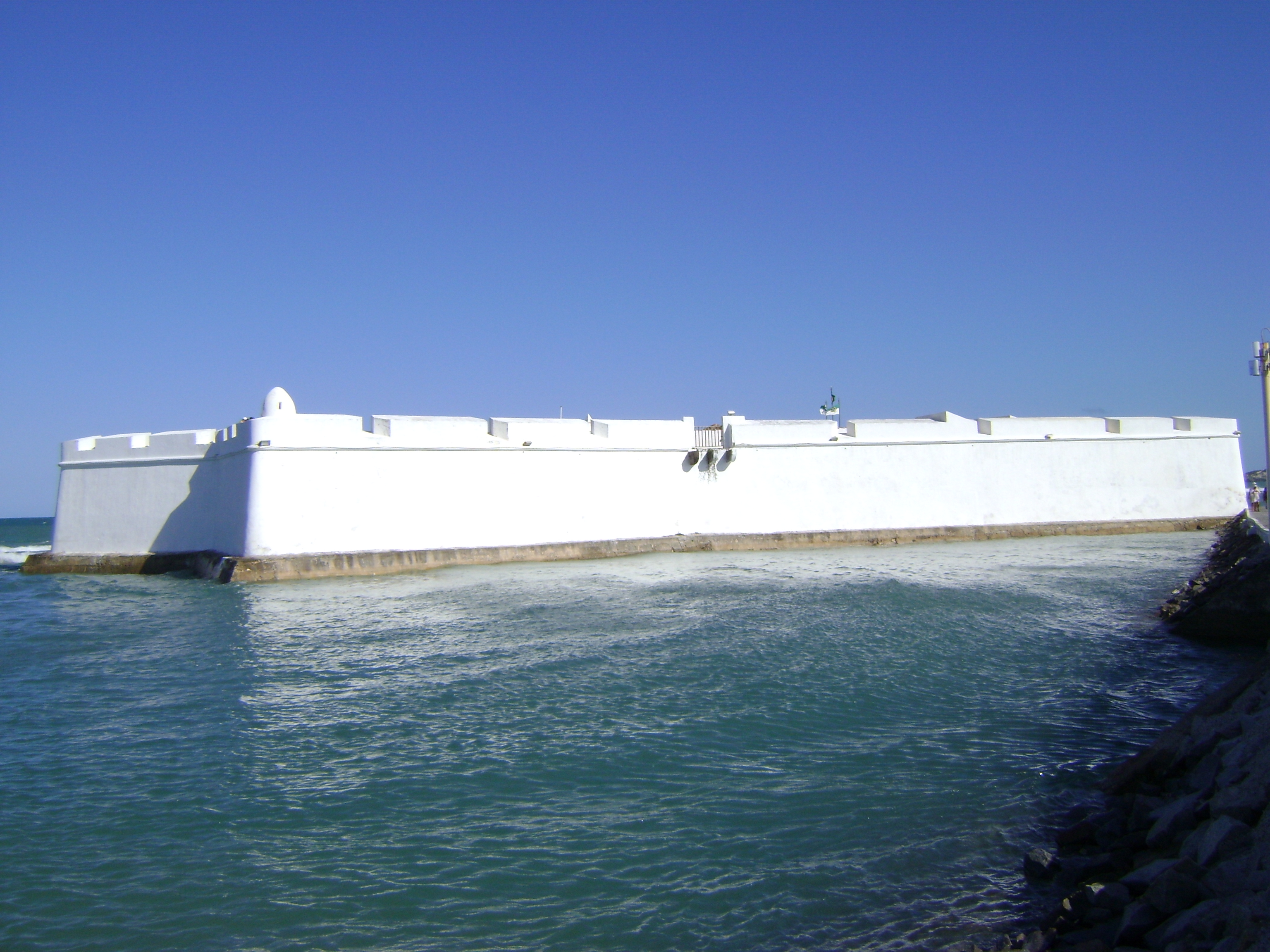
The historic Forte dos Reis Magos in Natal served as the Pit Stop during this leg.

- Episode 5 (10 November 2007)
- Prize: A trip for two to Angra dos Reis (awarded to Andréa & Luciana)
- Eliminated: Mari Lice & Tâmisa

Locations

- Jequiá da Praia (Dunas de Marapé)
- Maceió (Maceió Bus Station) → Natal, Rio Grande do Norte (Terminal Rodoviário de Natal)
- Natal (Farol de Mãe Luíza (in Portuguese))
- Maxaranguape (Ma-Noa Park (in Portuguese)) (Overnight Rest)
- Parnamirim (Centro de Lançamento da Barreira do Inferno)
- Extremoz (Genipabu Dunes)
- Natal (Forte dos Reis Magos)

Episode summary

- At the start of the leg, teams were instructed to travel by bus to Natal. Once there, they had to find their clues at their marked vehicles, where they had to drive to Farol de Mãe Luíza, both team members climb up the top of the tower to get their next clue, that would direct them to Ma-Noa Park in Maxaranguape, where they had to take one of the three departure times the next morning to get their next clue, directing them to ride a boat and swim among the coral reefs for their clues attached from one of the three buoys.
- Teams had to drive to Centro de Lançamento da Barreira do Inferno in Parnamirim. Due to military concerns, they would be greeted by the military officer from the entrance and the sergeant would stop them by learning the proper way of military salute and make an address to recite to Commander Antonio Higgins at the Commander’s Office, who would hand them their next clue.
- In this leg's Roadblock, one team member had to wear a protective gear, must construct a small rocket, transport it and insert it into a launch pad and check to the military official for inspection in order to receive their next clue.
- After the Roadblock, teams had to drive to Genipabu Dunes in Extremoz for their next clue.
- This leg's Detour was a choice between With Thrills (Com Emoção) or Without Thrills (Sem Emoção). In With Thrills, teams had to choose a dune buggy and both team members must take a ride through a marked course in order to receive their clue. In Without Thrills, teams had to choose a dromedary camel, one team member would have a ride while their partner would trek through a shorter course in order to receive their next clue.
- After the Detour, teams had to sled down a steep dune and drive themselves to the Pit Stop: Forte dos Reis Magos.

Additional note

- Miss Rio Grande do Norte 2007 Kalline Freire as the Pit Stop greeter for this leg.

=== Leg 6 (Rio Grande do Norte → Ceará) ===
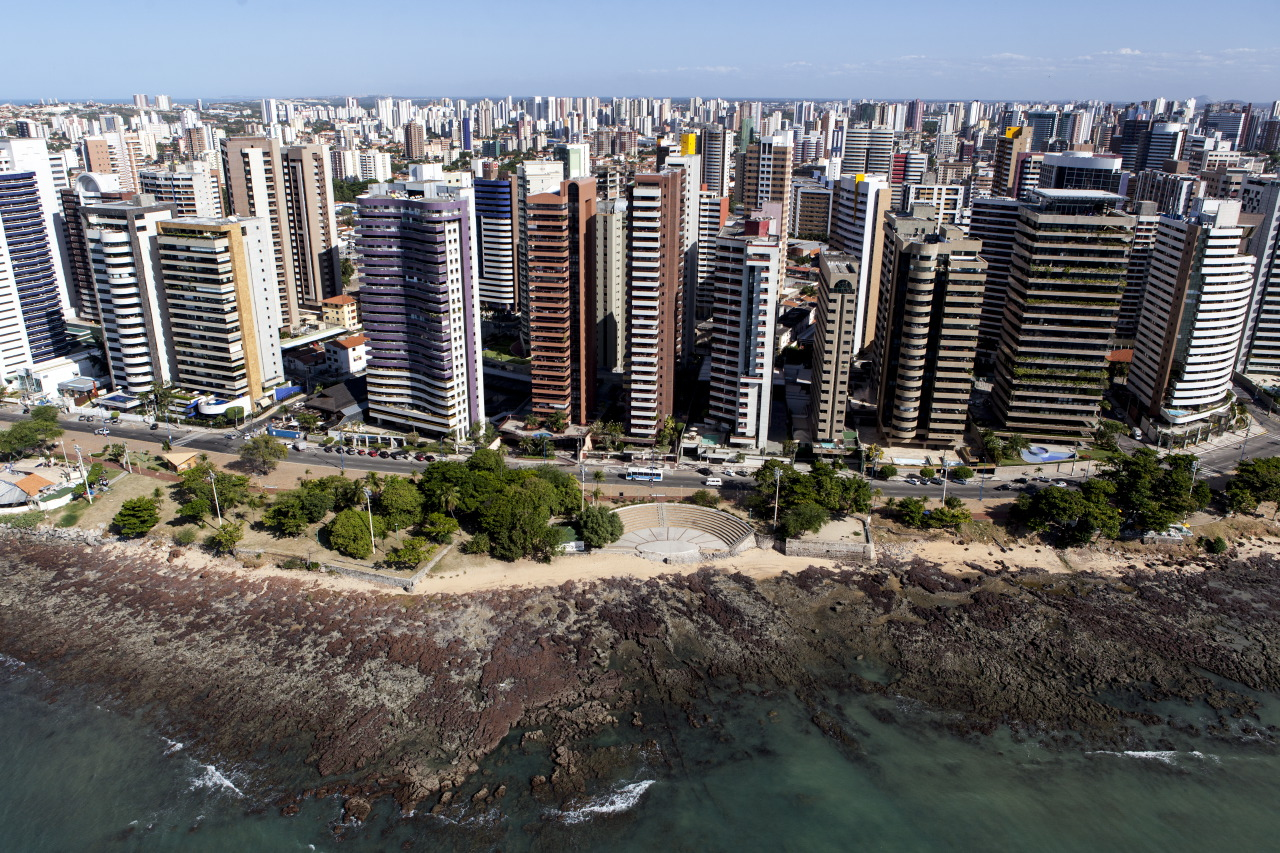
Teams traveled to the city of Fortaleza in the state of Ceará during this leg.

- Episode 6 (17 November 2007)
- Prize: A trip for two to Salvador (awarded to Perri & Maristela)

Locations

- Natal (Forte dos Reis Magos)
- Natal → Beberibe, Ceará (Praia de Uruaú)
- Beberibe (Falésias de Morro Branco)
- Beberibe (Capela de São Pedro)
- Fortaleza (Praia de Mucuripe)
- Fortaleza (Pier Inglês – Pirata Bar)
- Fortaleza (Centro Dragão do Mar de Arte e Cultura)
- Fortaleza (Praça do Ferreira (in Portuguese))
- Fortaleza (Mercado Encetur)
- Aquiraz (Wind Power Plant)

Episode summary

- At the start of the leg, teams were instructed to travel by bus to Praia de Uruaú in Beberibe where they had to find their next clue, they would choose a buggy and ride, then instructing to grab three flags to Falésias de Morro Branco in order to receive their next clue. If they missed the flags, they would have to go back and start over. The clue directed them to a labyrinth nearby onto a sand cliff for their next clue.
- The clues instructed to travel by foot to Capela de São Pedro, directing them to drive themselves to Praia de Mucuripe in Fortaleza for their next clue.
- This leg's Detour was a choice between Swim (Nadar) or Row (Remar). In Swim, teams had to swim with a bodyboard to a raft a short distance away onto the ocean to find a jangada and find a man who would hand them their next clue. In Row, teams had to kayak a longer distance and would have to paddle on a marked sailboat which is far away until they would get their next clue.
- After the Detour, teams had to drive to Pirata Bar where they would get their next clue.
- In this leg's Roadblock, one team member had to climb onto the mast of the ship and retrieve their next clue at the top.
- After the Roadblock, teams instructed to travel by foot to Centro Dragão do Mar de Arte e Cultura and search for their next clue, that would lead them to Praça do Ferreira and must search a specific market for a female vendor with a local craft in order to receive their next clue, that would direct them to Mercado Encetur to grab their clue, led them to drive to the Pit Stop: Wind Power Plant in Aquiraz.

Additional notes

- Andréa & Luciana and their film crew were robbed at gunpoint during the leg. By the time the film crew recovered their belongings and were allowed to continue racing.
- This was a non-elimination leg.

=== Leg 7 (Ceará → Amazonas) ===
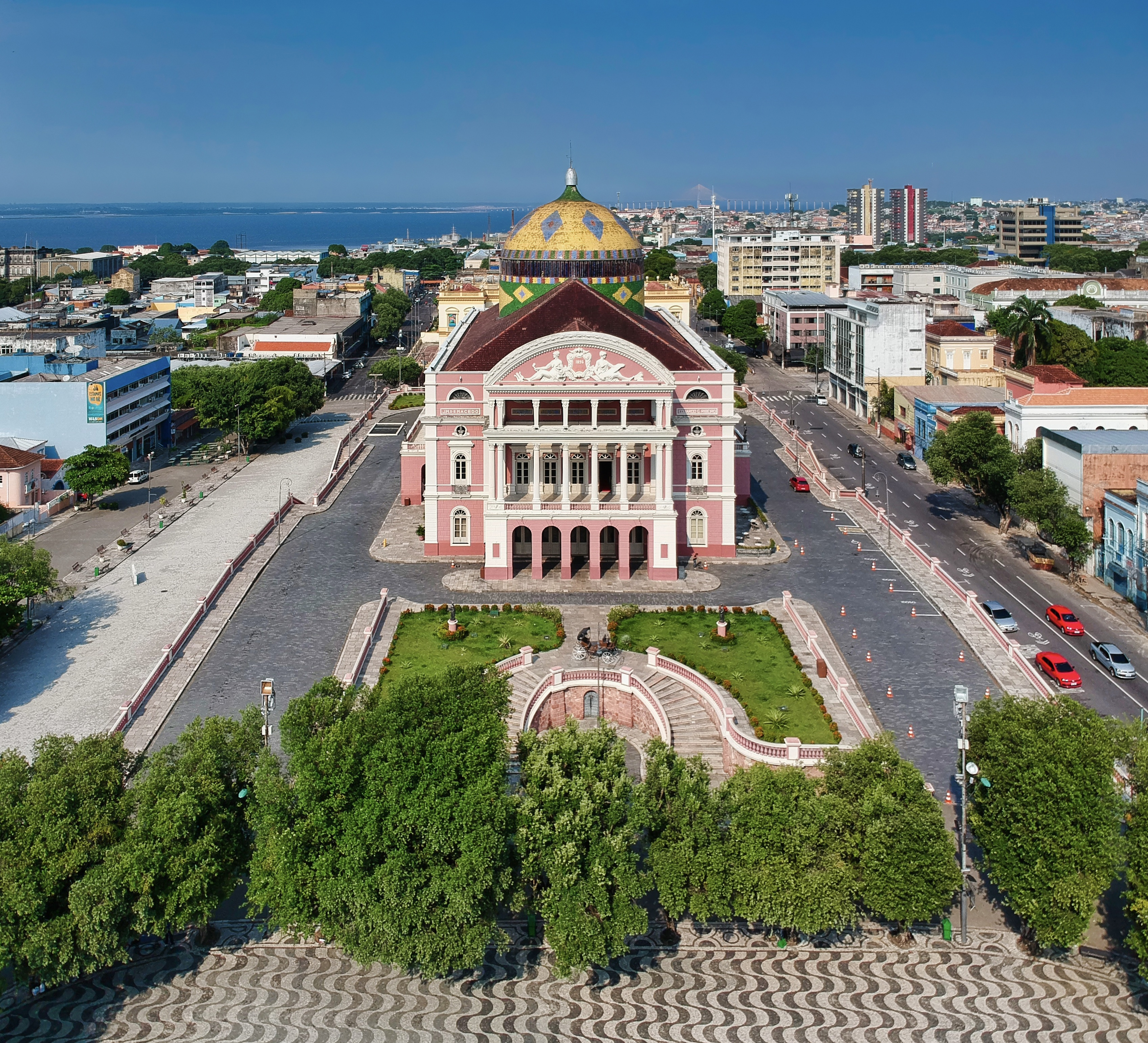
The iconic Teatro Amazonas in Manaus visited by teams on this leg.

- Episode 7 (24 November 2007)
- Prize: A trip for two to Curitiba (awarded to Perri & Maristela)
- Eliminated: Milene & Jaqueline

Locations

- Aquiraz (Wind Power Plant)
- Fortaleza (Fortaleza Airport) → Manaus, Amazonas (Eduardo Gomes International Airport)
- Presidente Figueiredo (Marupiara Eco Resort)
- Manaus (Teatro Amazonas)
- Manaus (Porto Ceasa (in Portuguese) and Meeting of Waters)
- Manaus (Port of Manaus) (Overnight Rest)
- Manaus (Porto São Raimudo (in Portuguese)) → Novo Airão (Porto de Novo Airão)
- Novo Airão (Restaurante Boto-Cor-de-Rosa)
- Iranduba (Pousada Amazônia) → Rio Ariaú (Sateré-Mawé Tribal Village)

Episode summary

- At the start of the leg, teams were instructed to fly to Manaus. Once there, they had to choose a marked car and drive themselves to Presidente Figueiredo and find Fazenda Marupiara, where they would get their next clue.
- This leg's Detour was a choice between Adventure (Aventurar) or Survival (Sobreviver). In Adventure, teams had to take part on a rope course above the treetops, which included a rope bridge and ziplines to complete the course in order to receive their next clue. In Survival, teams had to assemble an arapuca, an indigenous trap for catching small birds and mammals, with the materials provided in order to receive their next clue.
- After the Detour, teams had to drive to Teatro Amazonas to locate for their next clue, that would lead them to travel to Porto Ceasa, where they had to take a marked boat that would take them out to a fishing boat on the Meeting of Waters, where they would receive their next clue and then return to Porto Ceasa. Teams then headed to Port of Manaus and would proceed on a boat at the top of Rio Negro to spend the night upon grabbing one of seven departure times the next morning, they would get their next clue in order of their departure.
- In this leg's Roadblock, one team member had to find a marked stall and carry a 10-kilogram (22 lb) tambaqui fish. Then, they have to carry it to the docks to a marked stall inside the market in order to receive their next clue.
- After the Roadblock, teams aboard a ferry to Porto de Novo Airão, and had to drive to Restaurante Boto-Cor-de-Rosa in Novo Airão. Once there, they had to feed six fish to pink river dolphins in order to receive their next clue, that would direct them to Pousada Amazônia in Iranduba, where they had to paddle across the Rio Ariaú in a canoe, then hike to a long direction to the Pit Stop: the Sateré-Mawé Tribal Village.

Additional note

- Teams encountered a Yield at Port of Manaus, but none of the teams to use the Yield.

=== Leg 8 (Amazonas → Distrito Federal) ===
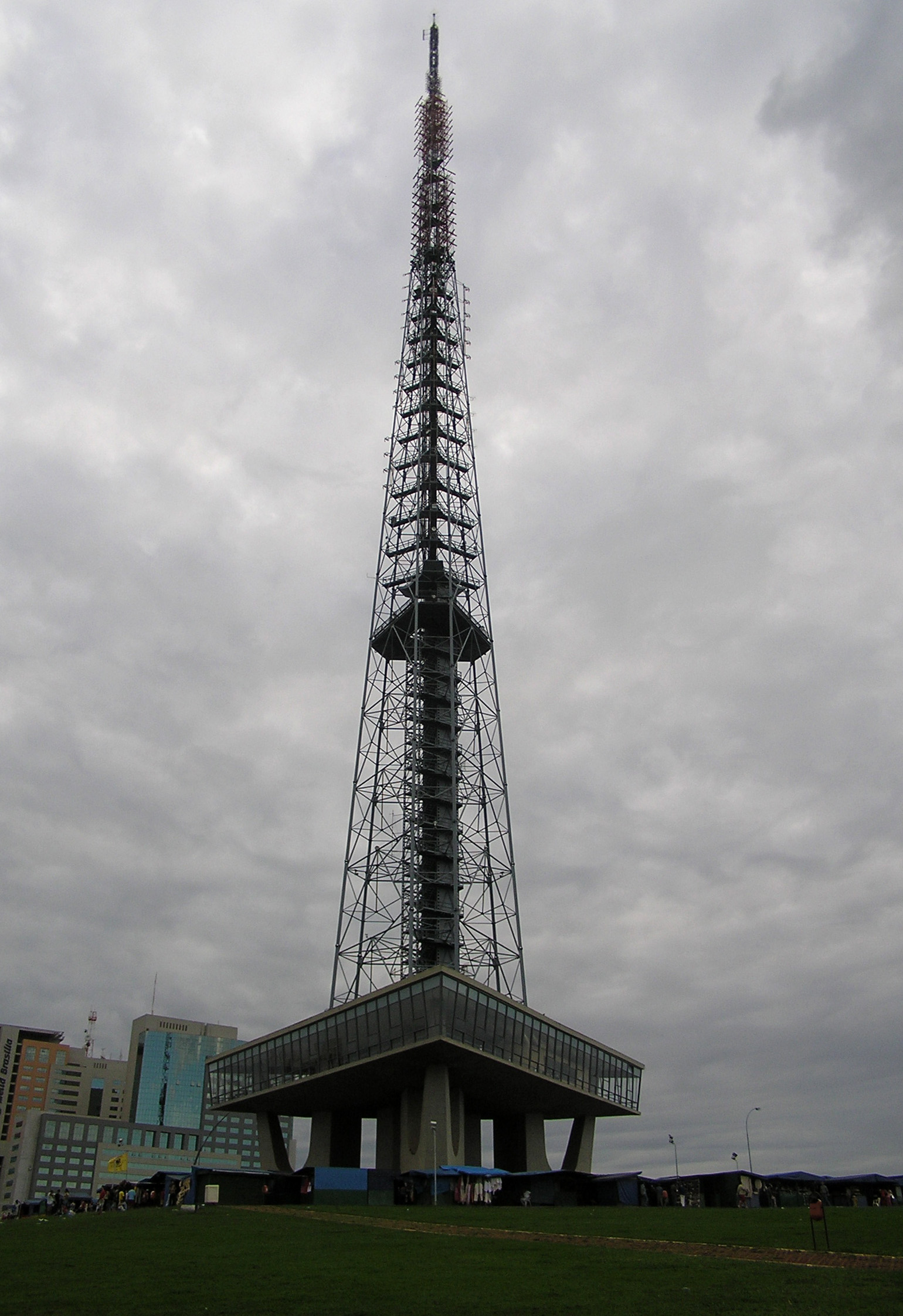
After arriving in Brasília, teams visited Torre de TV for their first clue.

- Episode 8 (1 December 2007)
- Prize: A trip for two to Curitiba (awarded to Débora & Daniela)
- Eliminated: Andréa & Luciana

Locations

- Iranduba (Pousada Amazônia)
- Manaus (Eduardo Gomes International Airport) → Brasília, Distrito Federal (Brasília International Airport)
- Brasília (Torre de TV)
  - Brasília (Academia de Tênis Resort (in Portuguese))
- Brasília (JK Memorial)
- Brasília (Rodoviária do Plano Piloto (in Portuguese))
- Brasília (Congresso Nacional Gardens)
- Brasília (Espaço Galleria Dance Club or Espaço Cultural Renato Russo)
- Planaltina (Vale do Amanhecer Community)

Episode summary

- At the start of the leg, teams were instructed to fly to the capital city of Brasília. Once there, they had to head to Torre de TV to grab their next clue.
- In the series’ second Fast Forward required one team to travel to Academia de Tênis Resort and each team member would have face against a two-on-one match with the professional tennis coach. Once they both scored five points each, they would win the Fast Forward. Jonatas & Rafael won the Fast Forward.
- Teams who did not choose the Fast Forward had to travel to JK Memorial and grab their next clue, that would direct them to Rodoviária do Plano Piloto where they would get their next clue.
- In this leg's Roadblock, one team member must search the people inside the bus terminal and had to whisper a code phrase ("The sky is blue" – O céu é azul), until they found a someone who would reply with another phrase ("The sea is green" – O mar é verde), who would give them their next clue.
- After the Roadblock, teams had to travel to Congresso Nacional Gardens where they would get their next clue.
- This leg's Detour was a choice between Compose (Compor) or Composer (Compositor). In Compose, teams had to go to the Espaço Galleria Dance Club where they would dress as local musicians and must perform a rap song incorporating the names of all of the Pit Stops visited so far on the season to the satisfaction of the crowd in order to receive their next clue. In Composer, teams had to go to the Espaço Cultural Renato Russo where they had to find a piece of sheet music and grab a copy of the Brazilian National Anthem, and present it to the pianist who would perform the song for them in order to receive their next clue.
- After the Detour, teams had to check in at the Pit Stop: Vale do Amanhecer Community in Planaltina.

=== Leg 9 (Distrito Federal → São Paulo) ===
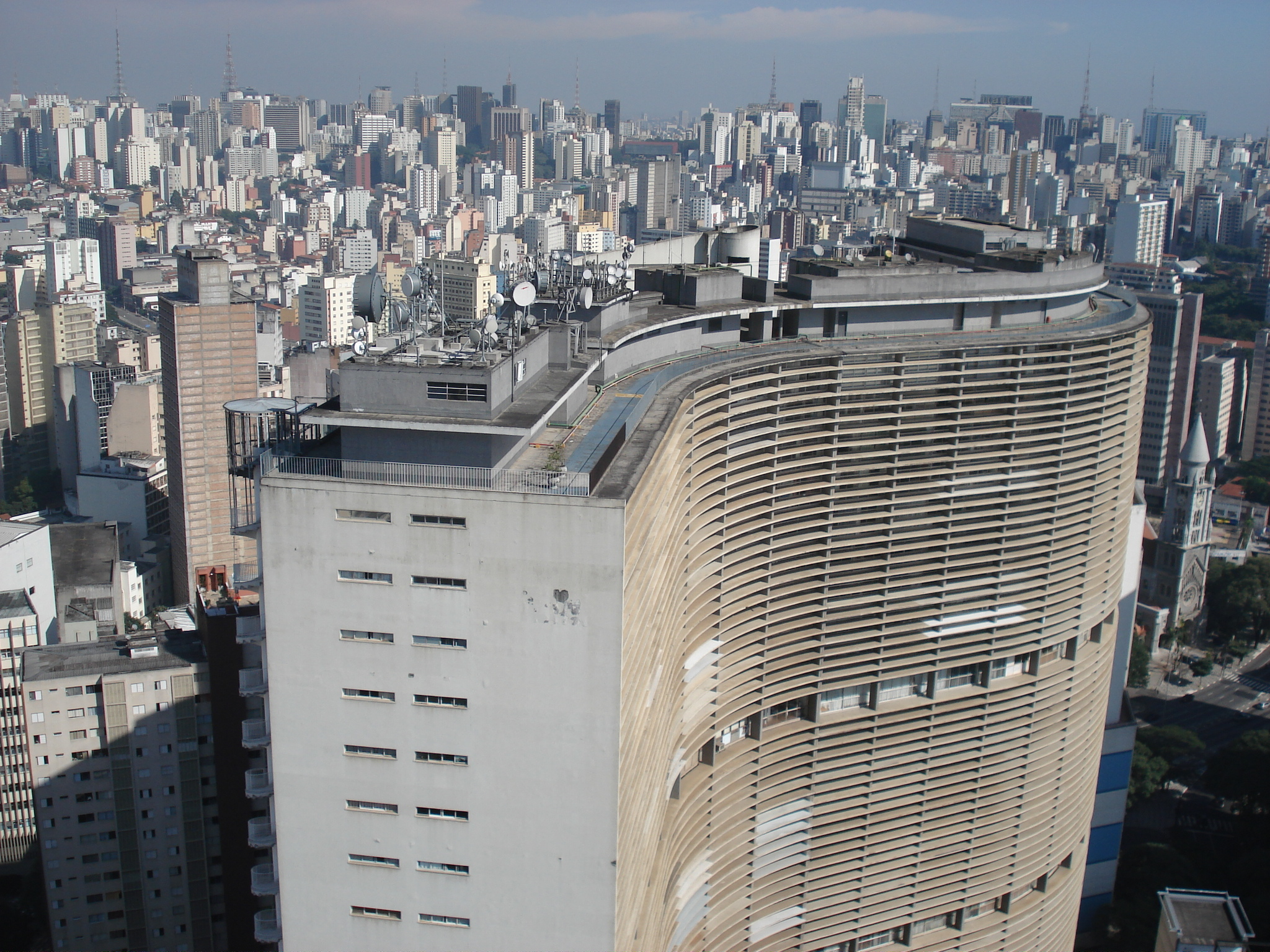
In São Paulo, teams had to make their way up to the rooftop of Edifício Copan to retrieve their clue.

- Episode 9 (8 December 2007)
- Prize: A trip for two to Recife (awarded to Perri & Maristela)

Locations

- Brasília (Congreso Nacional Gardens)
- Brasília (Brasília International Airport) → São Paulo, São Paulo (São Paulo–Congonhas Airport)
- São Paulo (Edifício Copan Rooftop)
- São Paulo (Viaduto do Chá)
- Barueri (RedeTV! Studios)
- Itu (Base 84 Adventure Park)
- Itu (Kartódromo Schincariol)
- Indaiatuba (Colônia Helvétia)

Episode summary

- At the start of the leg, teams were instructed to fly to São Paulo. Once there, they had to search the airport parking lot for a marked car, contained their next clue.
- Teams had to drive to Edifício Copan and would proceed to Bloco F elevator to the rooftop and search for their next clue, directing them to Viaduto do Chá for their next clue beside the bridge, leading them to RedeTV! Studios in Barueri. The first team to arrive had to retrieve their next clue from Olga Bongiovanni during the taping of Bom Dia Mulher, the remaining teams would receive their next clue from outside of the production set, that would drive them to Base 84 in Itu.
- This leg's Detour was a choice between Dirt (Terra) or Water (Água). In Dirt, teams had to compete an off-road track driving a 4x4 vehicle. Then, they must compete an off-road course maneuvering a vehicle on a giant teeter-totter in order to receive their next clue. Only one team could compete at the time. In Water, teams would have had to take part to choose a bamboo and banana tree trunks to construct a raft. Once they assembled, they would have had to cross a small lake to get their next clue at the bottom. Débora & Daniela attempted Water, all teams completed Dirt.
- After the Detour, teams had to assemble a tent to receive their next clue, that directed them to drive to Kartódromo Schincariol.
- In this leg's Roadblock, one team member had to ride a go-kart race within ten laps inside the race track in order to receive their next clue, directing them to the Pit Stop: Colônia Helvétia in Indaiatuba.

Additional notes

- Teams encountered the series’ final Yield at Kartódromo Schincariol, but none of the teams to use the Yield.
- This was a non-elimination leg.

=== Leg 10 (São Paulo → Paraná) ===
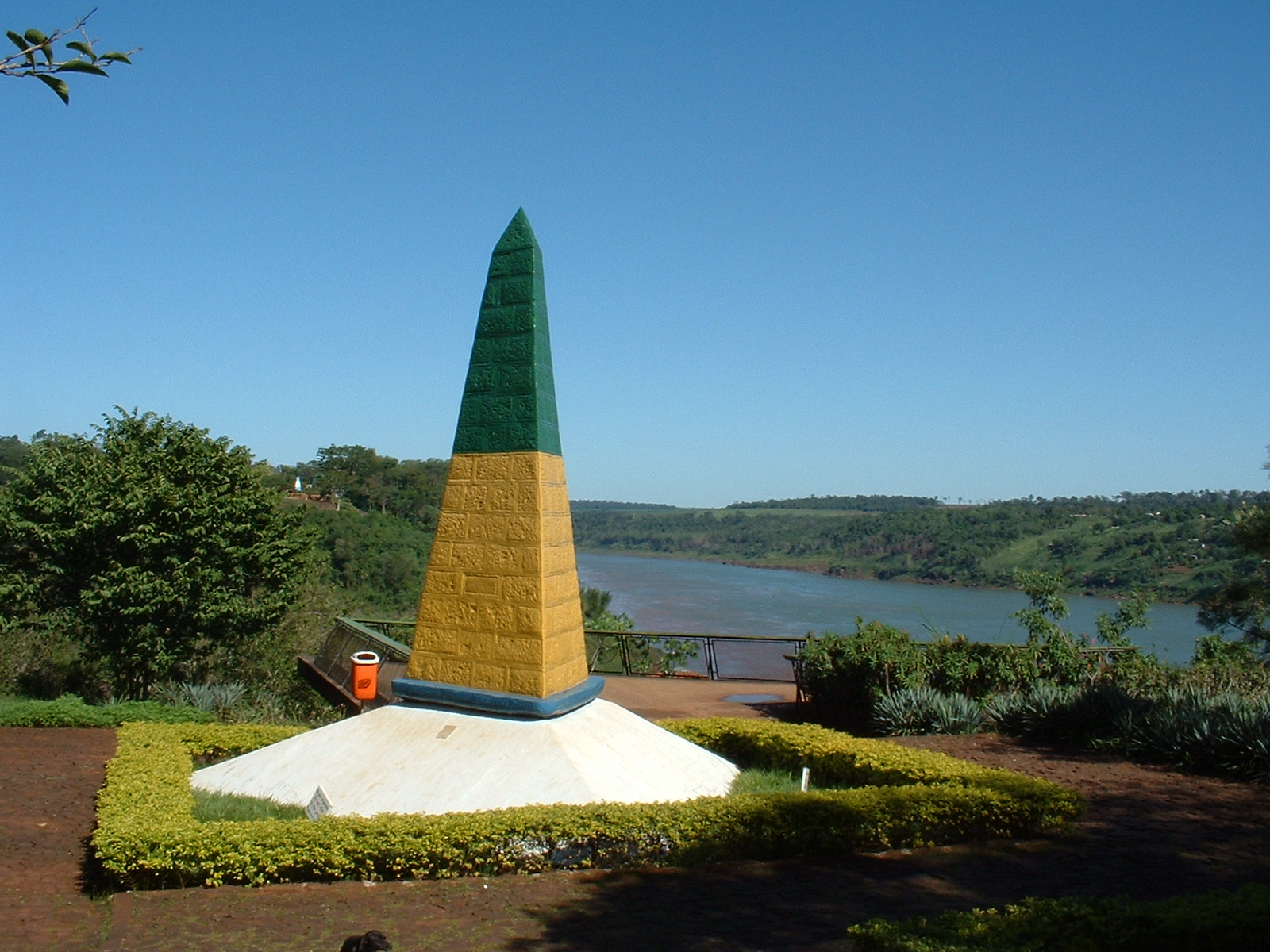
The Triple Frontier landmark on the Brazilian side overlooking Iguaçu River served as the Pit Stop.

- Episode 10 (15 December 2007)
- Prize: A trip for two to Buenos Aires, Argentina (awarded to Jorge & Silvia)
- Eliminated: Débora & Daniela

Locations

- Indaiatuba (Colônia Helvétia)
- Indaiatuba (Terminal Rodoviário de Indaiatuba) → Foz do Iguaçu, Paraná (Rodoviária International Foz do Iguaçu)
  - Iguaçu National Park (Macuco Safari)
- Iguaçu National Park (Poço Preto Trail)
- Iguaçu National Park (Cânion Iguaçu (in Portuguese))
- Iguaçu National Park (Mirante Garganta do Diabo)
- Foz do Iguaçu (Paudimar Youth Hostel)
- Foz do Iguaçu (Triple Frontier Landmark)

Episode summary

- At the start of the leg, teams were instructed to travel by bus to Foz do Iguaçu. Once there, they would arrive at the bus terminal to get their next clue, directing them to Iguaçu National Park.
- For this series’ third and final Fast Forward required one team to travel to Macuco Safari and would have to climb 288 steps, rappel down 55 meters to the ground down below, then complete a medium difficulty rafting course on the top of Iguaçu River. The first team to reach it would win the Fast Forward award. Jorge & Silvia won the Fast Forward.
- Teams who did not choose the Fast Forward had to direct them to Poço Preto Trail. Once there, they were given three bird names in random order and had to identify them amongst the pictures posted in the trees throughout the trail in order to receive their next clue, directing them to Cânion Iguaçu.
- This leg's Detour was a choice between Climb (Subir) or Jump (Pular). In Climb, each team member had to climb a medium difficulty rock wall to grab their next clue at the top. In Jump, each team member one at the time, had to put a blindfold and climb a 15-meter pole, and from the top, jump to grab a trapeze bar relying their partner’s instructions from the ground in order to receive their next clue.
- After the Detour, teams instructed to travel by foot to Mirante Garganta do Diabo overlooking Iguaçu Falls to get their next clue, leading them to Camping Paudimar.
- In this leg's Roadblock, one team member had to present and to eat two kilograms (4.4 lb) of various meats in order to receive their next clue, directing them to the Pit Stop: the Triple Frontier Landmark.

Additional note

- All teams (except Jorge & Silvia, who took the Fast Forward) incurred three-hour penalties each because Maristela, Sane, Jonatas, and Débora chose to quit the Roadblock.

=== Leg 11 (Paraná) ===
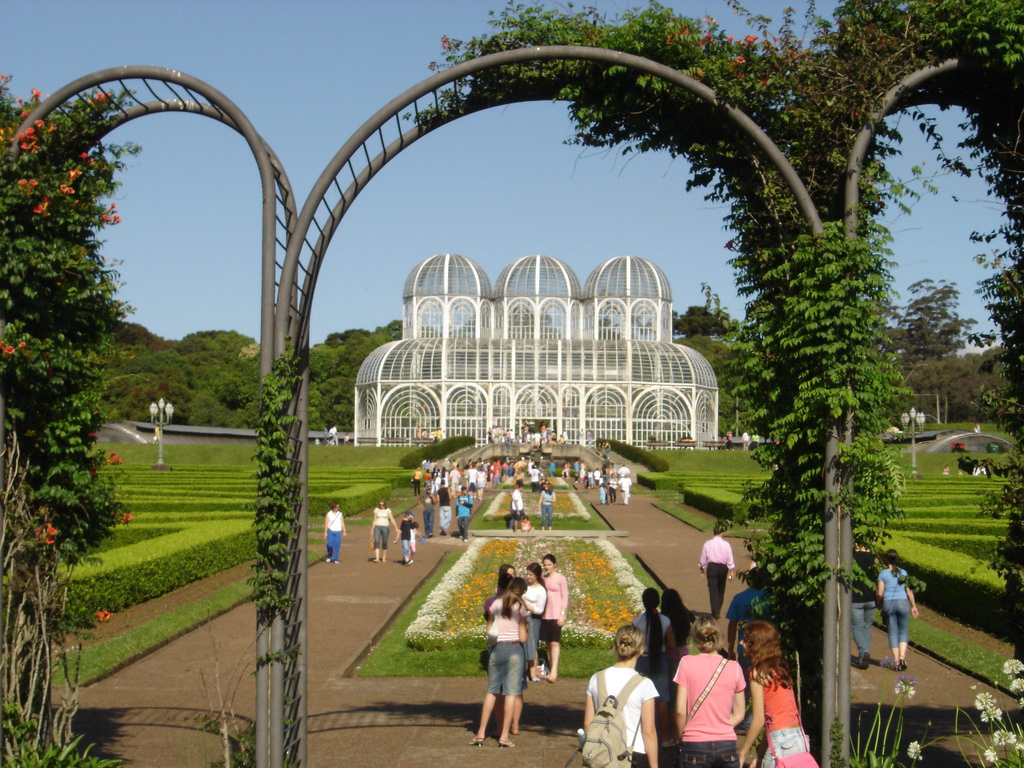
Teams visited Jardim Botânico in Curitiba for this leg.

- Episode 11 (22 December 2007)
- Prize: A trip for two to Rio de Janeiro (awarded to Patrícia & Sane)

Locations

- Foz do Iguaçu (Triple Frontier Landmark)
- Foz do Iguaçu (Rodoviária International Foz do Iguaçu) → Curitiba (Rodoviária de Curitiba)
- Curitiba (Jardim Botânico)
- Curitiba (Ópera de Arame)
- Curitiba (Parque Tingui (in Portuguese))
- Curitiba (Drop Dead Skate Park or Figaro Used Book Store)
- Morretes (Railway Station)
- Morretes (Santuário Nhundiaquara)
- Morretes (Metal Bridge over the Nhundiaquara River) (Overnight Rest)
- Paranaguá (Port of Paranaguá)
- Ilha do Mel (Praia Encantada)

Episode summary

- At the start of the leg, teams were instructed to travel by bus to Curitiba. Upon arrival, they had to head to Jardim Botânico and would get their next clue, directing them to Ópera de Arame to get their next clue. This would lead them to travel to Parque Tingüi, where they had to dress a traditional Ukrainian costume and participate the Ukrainian folk dance in order to receive their next clue.
- This leg's Detour was a choice between Skate or Sebo. In Skate, teams would have had to travel to Drop Dead Skate Park where they must assemble a skateboard and perform a medium difficulty skateboarding maneuver in order to receive their next clue. In Sebo, teams had to travel to Figaro Used Book Store, where they had to find thousands of books, records and magazines with three of those items to be sold the bookkeeper, who would exchange their next clue. Although Jonatas & Rafael attempted to do the Skate due to frustration and difficulties before switching to Sebo.
- After the Detour, teams had to travel by either train or bus to Morretes and disembark at the railway station to get their next clue, that would choose a bike a quarter of a mile to Santuário Nhundiaquara for their next clue.
- In this leg's Roadblock, one team member had to dig one of sixty dirt holes to find a pot. Then, they would open a local meal barreados (boiled pieces of meat) in order to receive their next clue.
- After the Roadblock, teams instructed to travel by foot to Metal Bridge over the Nhundiaquara River where they would have to spend the night. In order of their arrival, they had to grab one of the four life rings to walk across the river for their next clue. That directed them to Port of Paranaguá in Paranaguá, and would take a marked boat to Ilha do Mel to search for the Pit Stop: Praia Encantada.

Additional note

- This was a non-elimination leg.

=== Leg 12 (Paraná → Chile) ===
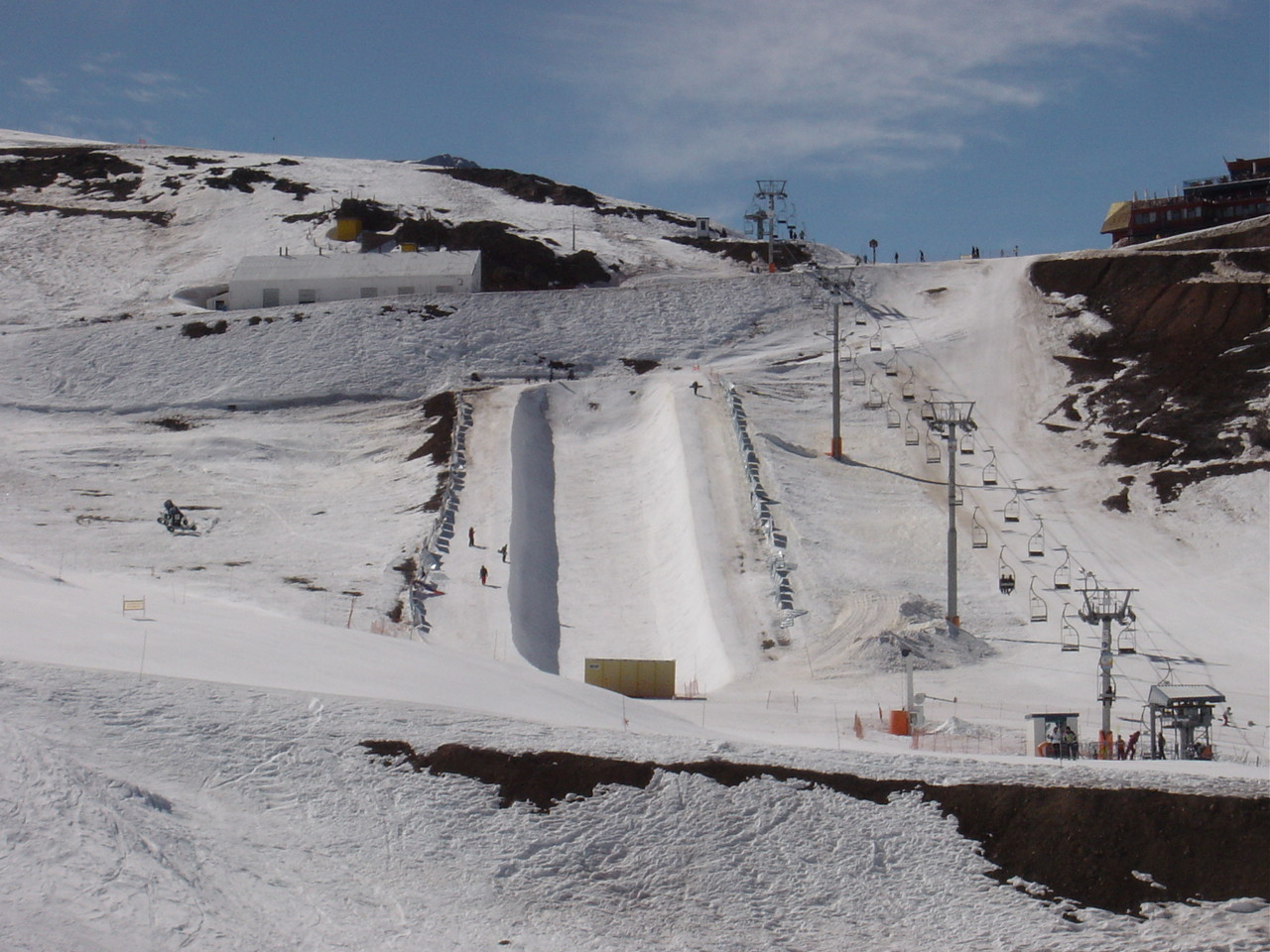
The ski resort of Valle Nevado outside Santiago served as the penultimate Pit Stop of The Amazing Race: A Corrida Milionária.

- Episode 12 (29 December 2007)
- Prize: A trip for two to Machu Picchu, Peru (awarded to Perri & Maristela)
- Eliminated: Jorge & Silvia

Locations

- Ilha do Mel (Praia Encantada) → Paranaguá (Port of Paranaguá)
- Curitiba (Afonso Pena International Airport) → Santiago, Chile (Arturo Merino Benítez International Airport)
- Santiago (Edificio Birmann – Chile.com Office)
- Santiago (Mall del Centro)
- Santiago (Plaza de Armas or Mercado Central)
- Santiago (Cerro San Cristóbal – Virgin Mary Statue)
- Santiago (Home of Pablo Neruda)
- Santiago (Diego's Bar and Grill, Libreria Chilena, and Library of Congress of Chile)
- Andes Mountains (Valle Nevado)

Episode summary

- At the start of the leg, teams were instructed to fly to Santiago, Chile. Once there, they had to search the marked vehicles at the airport's parking lot to grab their next clue, directing to drive to Chile.com Office at Edificio Birmann, where they would choose a laptop and watch the video message from their loved ones at home. Once they finished watching their video, the message would read their next clue and head them to Mall del Centro.
- This leg's Detour was a choice between Clean Boots (Limpar Botas) or Clean Fish (Limpar Peixes). In Clean Boots, teams had to travel to Plaza de Armas and must work to shine six pairs of shoes, charging at least CL$300 for each. Once they earned a total of CL$1,800, they exchanged for their next clue. In Clean Fish, teams had to travel to Mercado Central where they would pick up ten fish and transport them to a marked stall, then they had to gut, skin and fillet four of them. Both team members must eat one sea urchin in order to receive their next clue.
- After the Detour, teams had to take a funicular ride to Cerro San Cristóbal and look for Virgin Mary Statue, that would direct them to the home of famous author Pablo Neruda – La Chascona, where they received a book and their next clue.
- In this leg's Roadblock, one team member had to travel to Diego’s Bar and Grill and present the book to sign to Pablo Neruda impersonator, then make their way to Libreria Chilena, where they had to load 150 books onto a hand truck and deliver them to Library of Congress of Chile within the Former National Congress Building, and then placed and stacked the books on a bookshelf in order to receive their next clue.
- After the Roadblock, teams had to drive to Valle Nevado and hike along to the path to the Pit Stop.

=== Leg 13 (Chile) ===
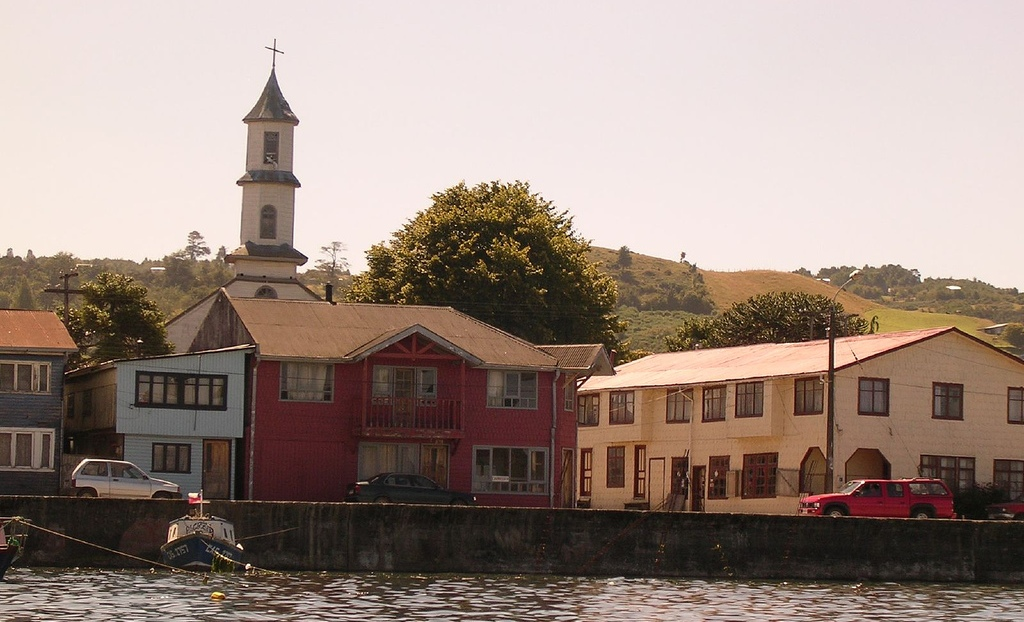
The seaside town of Dalcahue near Puerto Montt was the final destination of The Amazing Race: A Corrida Milionária.

- Episode 13 (5 January 2008)
- Prize: R$500,000
- Winners: Patrícia & Sane
- Runners-up: Jonatas & Rafael
- Disqualified (at the clam eating task): Perri & Maristela

Locations

- Andes Mountains (Valle Nevado)
- Santiago (Arturo Merino Benítez International Airport) → Puerto Montt (El Tepual Airport)
- Puerto Montt (Angelmó Market)
- Puerto Montt (Calle Las Quemas)
- Ancud, Chiloé Island (Cabañas Gaviotas) (Overnight Rest)
- Dalcahue (Farm near San Juan)
- Dalcahue (San Juan Fishing Village)
- Dalcahue (San Juan Central Plaza)
- Dalcahue (San Juan Overlook)

Episode summary

- At the start of the leg, teams were instructed to fly to Puerto Montt. Upon arrival at El Tepual Airport, they had to get their next clue from their marked car and drive themselves to Angelmó Market. Once there, they had to serve a platter of two kilograms (4.4 lb) of smoked clams and each team member would have to eat those in order to receive their next clue, they would go to carry a small wooden house and walk half a mile from the market to Calle Las Quemas in order to receive their next clue.
- Teams had to take a ferry from the mainland to Chiloé Island and search Cabañas Gaviotas lodge. Once there, they would claim one of two departure times the next morning. They would have to receive their next clue in the morning at the top of their cars, directing them to drive to a farm near San Juan in Dalcahue.
- In this series’ final Roadblock, one team member had to carry crates filled with 1,000 apples and crush them using a crushing equipment to make an apple juice in order to receive their next clue.
- After the Roadblock, teams had to travel by foot to a fishing village nearby and where they would choose a boat frame and paint the entire section, then they had to carry a canoe by foot to the Central Plaza for their next clue.
- This series’ final Detour was a choice between House (Casa) or Shell (Concha). In House, teams had to haul an empty mobile home out of the lake, and hook up onto two bulls on a harness and drive onto the shore to the dry land in order to receive their next clue. In Shell, teams would have had to pull four cages filled with clams from out of the water and retrieve 100 clams in order to receive their next clue. Jonatas & Rafael and Patrícia & Sane chose House.
- After the Detour, teams had to follow the trail to the Finish Line: San Juan Overlook.

Additional note

- Perri & Maristela were unable to complete the clam eating Route Info task, they were disqualified from the Race.
