= Our Lady Mother of Men Church =

Catholic temple in Minas Gerais, Brazil

- Igreja Nossa Senhora Mãe dos Homens
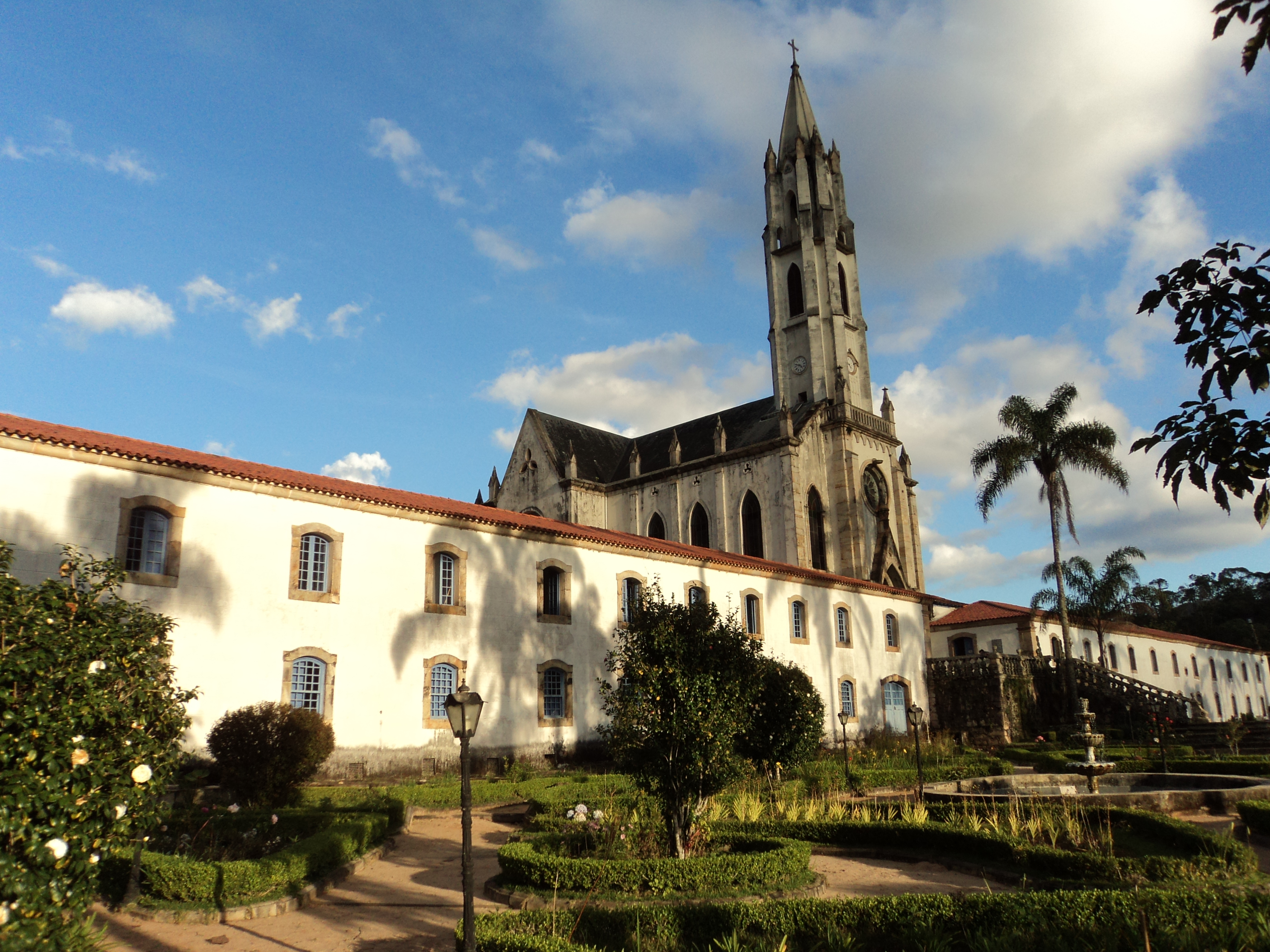
- Our Lady Mother of Men Church in the Caraça Sanctuary

- Location within Brazil

Religion
- Affiliation: Catholicism

Location
- Municipality: Catas Altas
- State: Minas Gerais
- Country: Brazil
- Interactive map of Our Lady Mother of Men Church
- Coordinates: 20°05′51″S 43°29′18″W

Architecture
- Style: Neo-Gothic
- Completed: 1883

Website
- http://www.santuariodocaraca.com.br/

The Our Lady Mother of Men Church Portuguese: Igreja Nossa Senhora Mãe dos Homens, part of the Caraça Sanctuary, is a Catholic temple in Catas Altas, Minas Gerais, Brazil. The official name of the complex is Sanctuary of Our Lady Mother of Men, but Caraça (Portuguese word for "big face") has this nickname because of the shape of part of the mountain, which resembles the face of a giant lying down.

Situated in the Serra do Caraça, the church was built from 1876 to 1883, during the peak of the mining period, where the former Ermida do Irmão Lourenço was. It was inaugurated on the 27th of May 1883, in the presence of the bishops from Rio de Janeiro, Mariana and Bahia. There was a church on the site built during Brother Lourenço's time, which was demolished to make way for Fr Clavelin's project. Two side altars remain from this church, which can be seen at the entrance to the building, one on each side.

One of the town's main tourist attractions, the church was the first to be built in Brazil in the neo-Gothic style. It has a 48-metre-high tower and a painting of the Holy Supper by Mestre Ataíde in 1828. The altar has a baroque image of Our Lady Mother of Men carved from wood in a single piece, with gold-painted clothes, which came from Portugal in 1784. The Sanctuary, once visited by the Brazilian presidents Afonso Pena and Artur Bernardes, is listed by IPHAN.

== Gallery ==
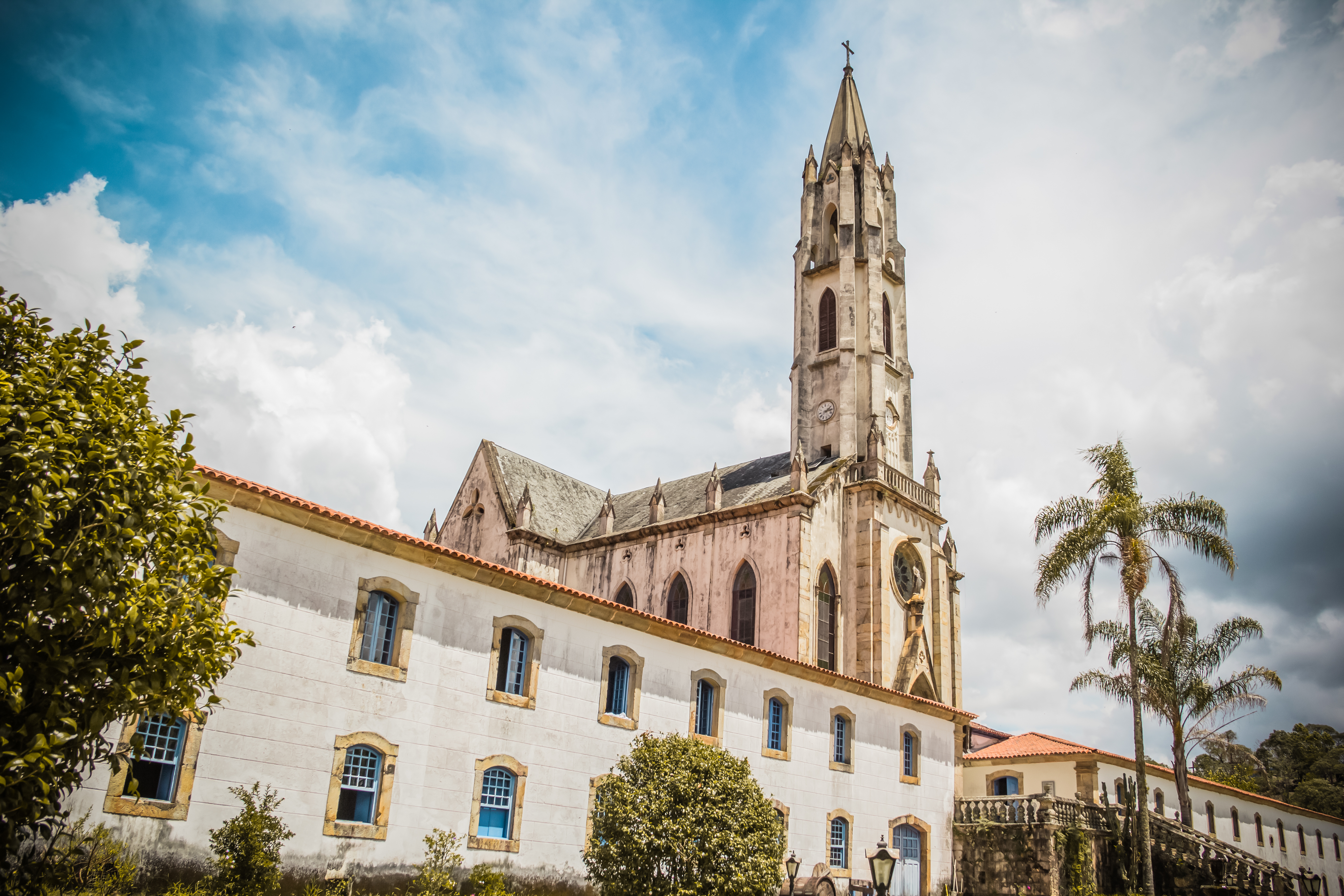
Our Lady Mother of Men Church

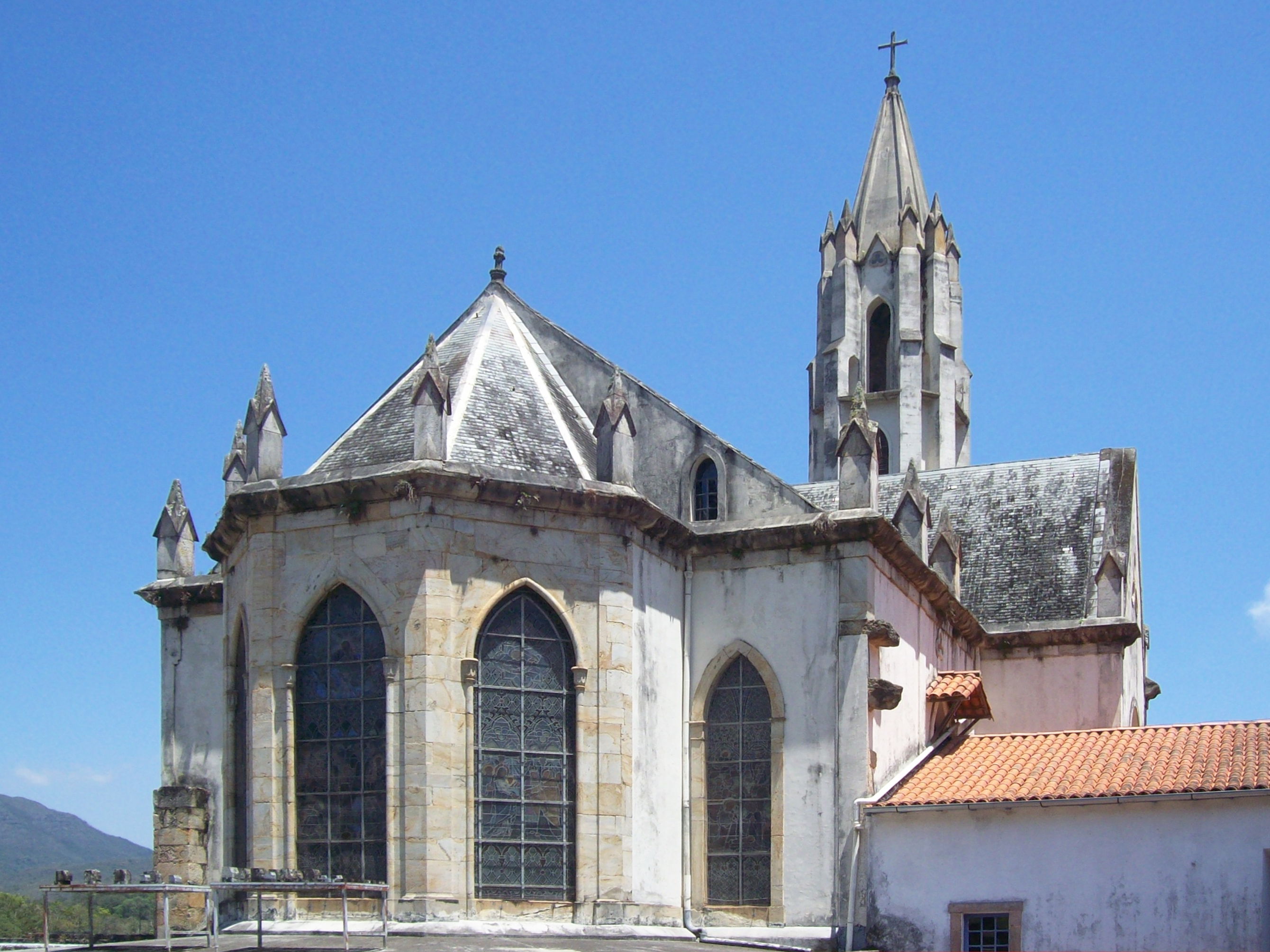
Rearview of the church

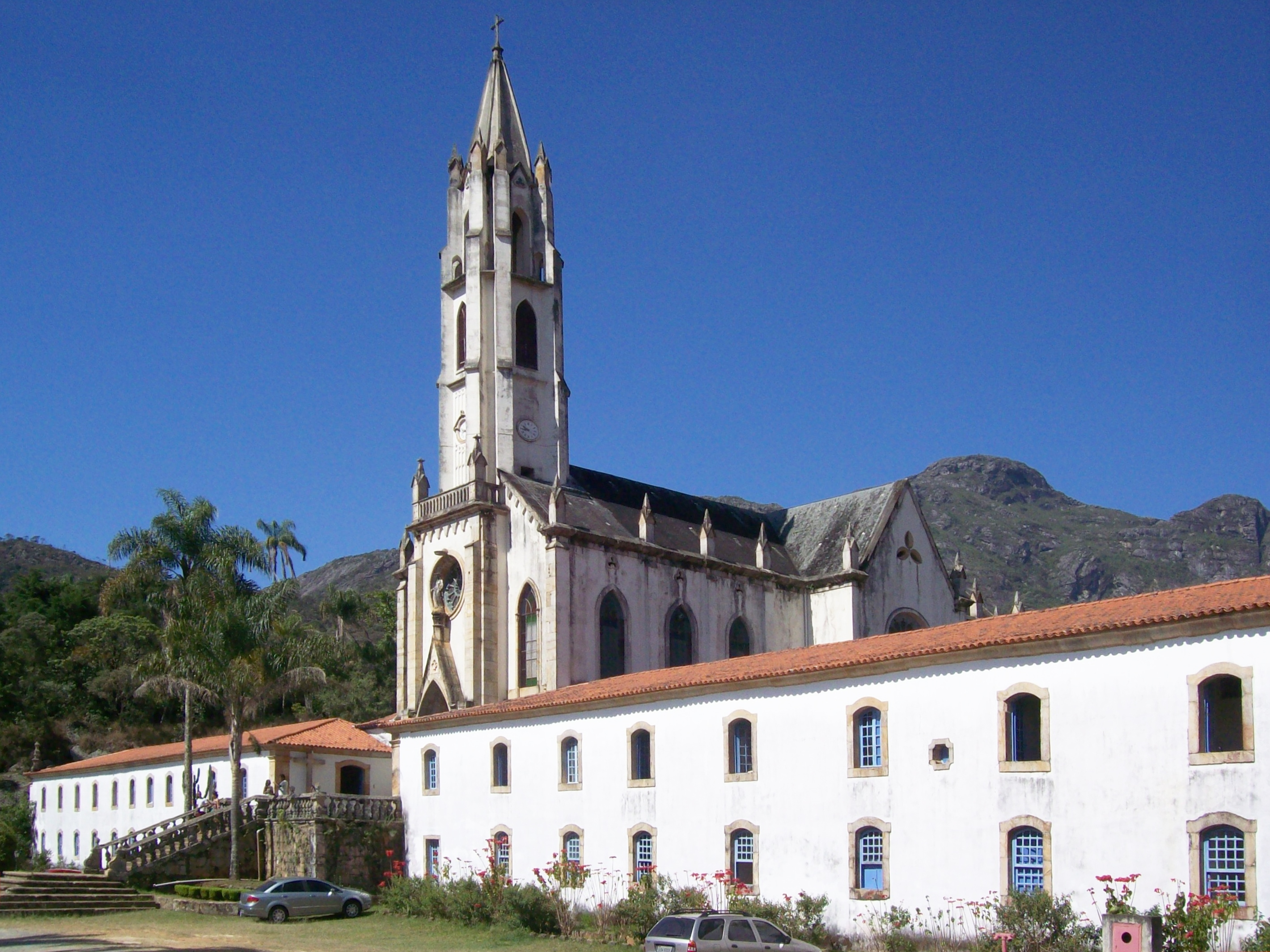
Exterior of the Caraça Sanctuary

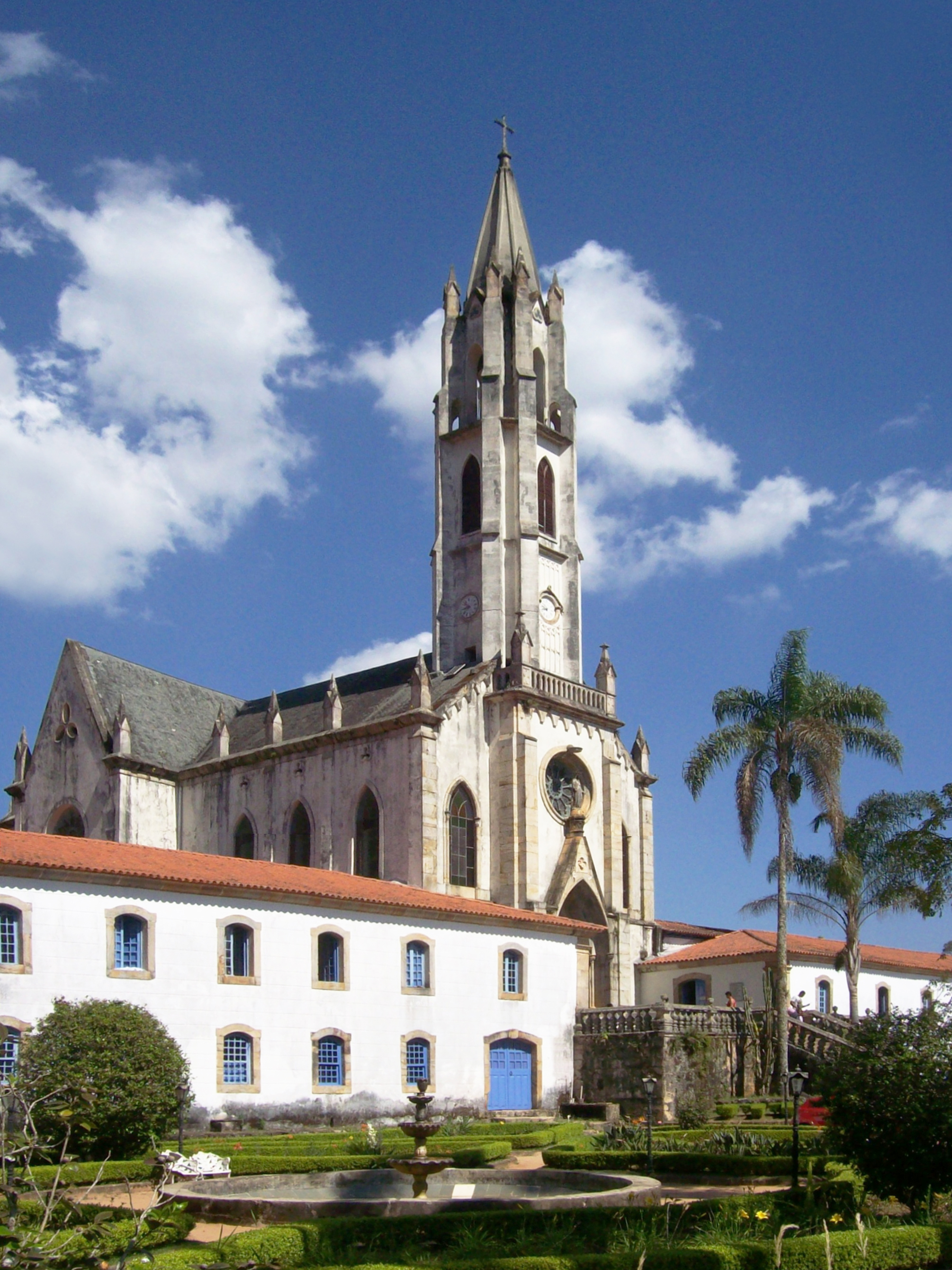
View of Our Lady Mother of Men Church

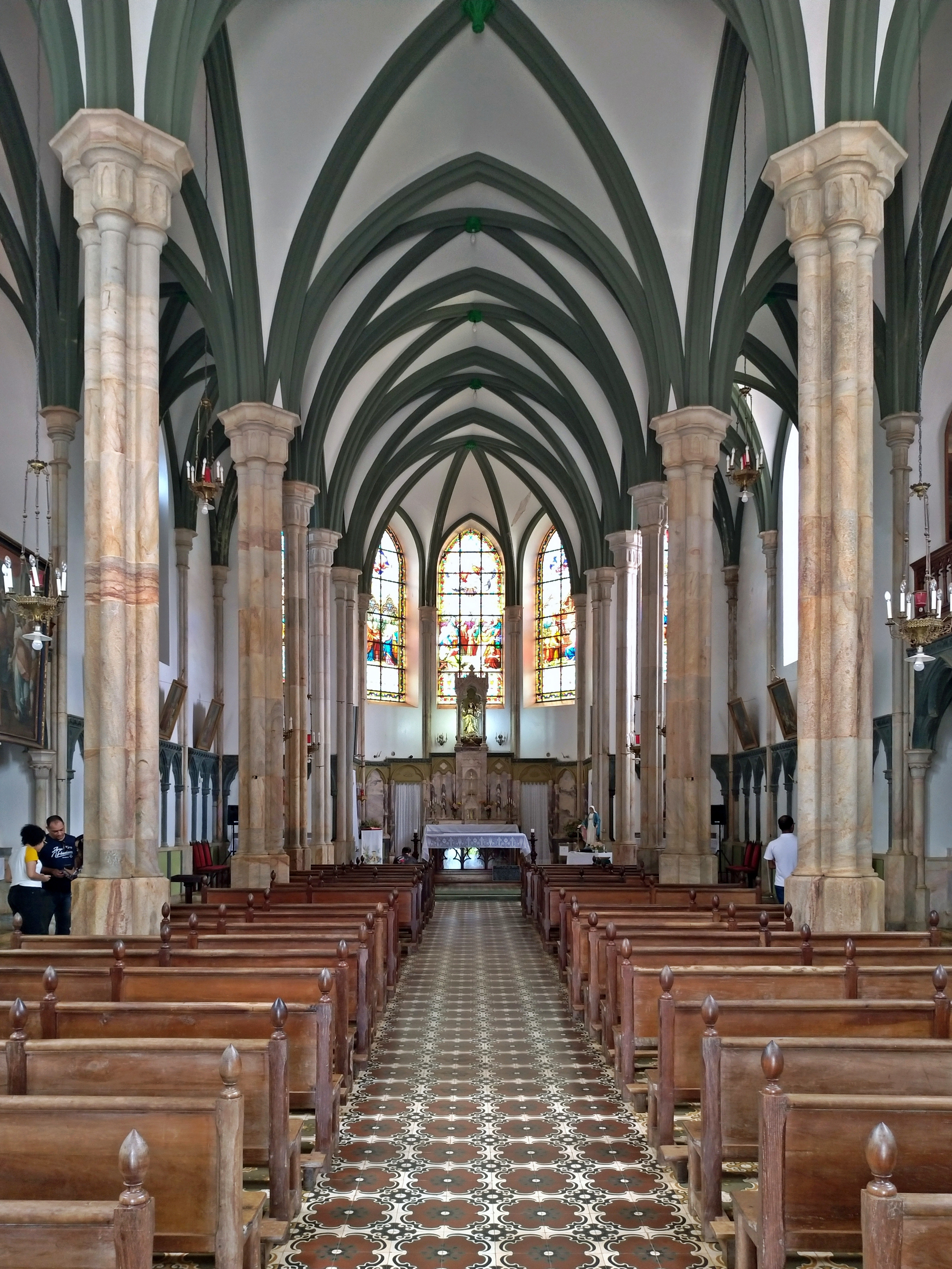
Church interior

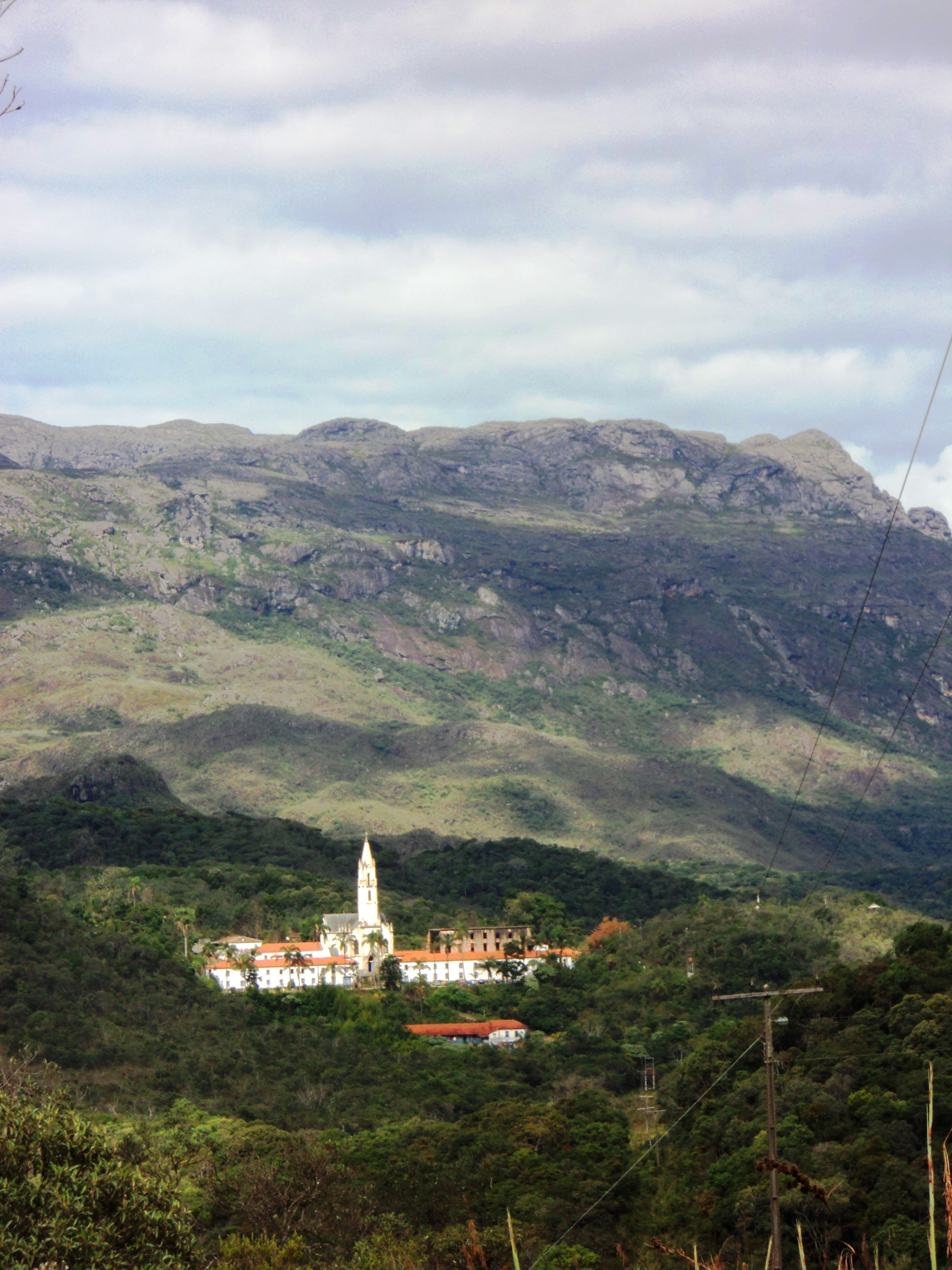
A distant view of the Caraça Sanctuary.
