= Dragão do Mar Center of Art and Culture =

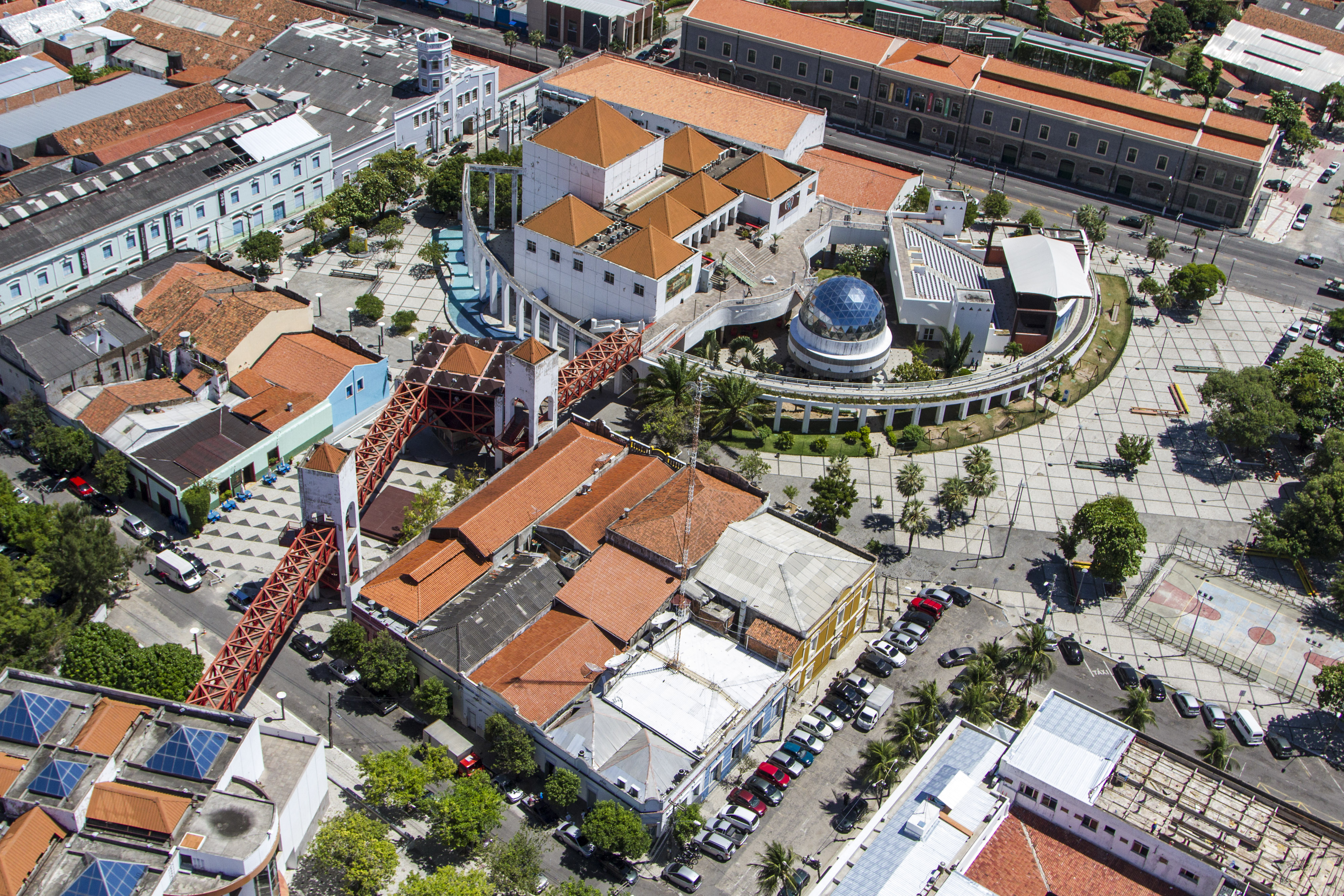
- Location: Brazil
- Coordinates: 3°43′16″S 38°31′12″W
- Area: 30,000 m^{2} (320,000 sq ft)
- Website: www.dragaodomar.org.br
- Location of Dragão do Mar Center of Art and Culture

The Dragão do Mar Center of Art And Culture (in Portuguese: Centro Dragão do Mar de Arte e Cultura) is a government funded cultural center in Fortaleza, Ceará in Brazil. The center contains facilities for exhibitions, a theatre, a library, a cinema and a planetarium.

The center was inaugurated in April 1999, and has an overall area of 33 000 m^{2}. The name "Dragão do Mar" is in honour of Francisco José do Nascimento, a hero of the abolitionist movement in Ceará, who in 1881 refused to transport slaves to be sold further south in the country.

== Cultural Places ==
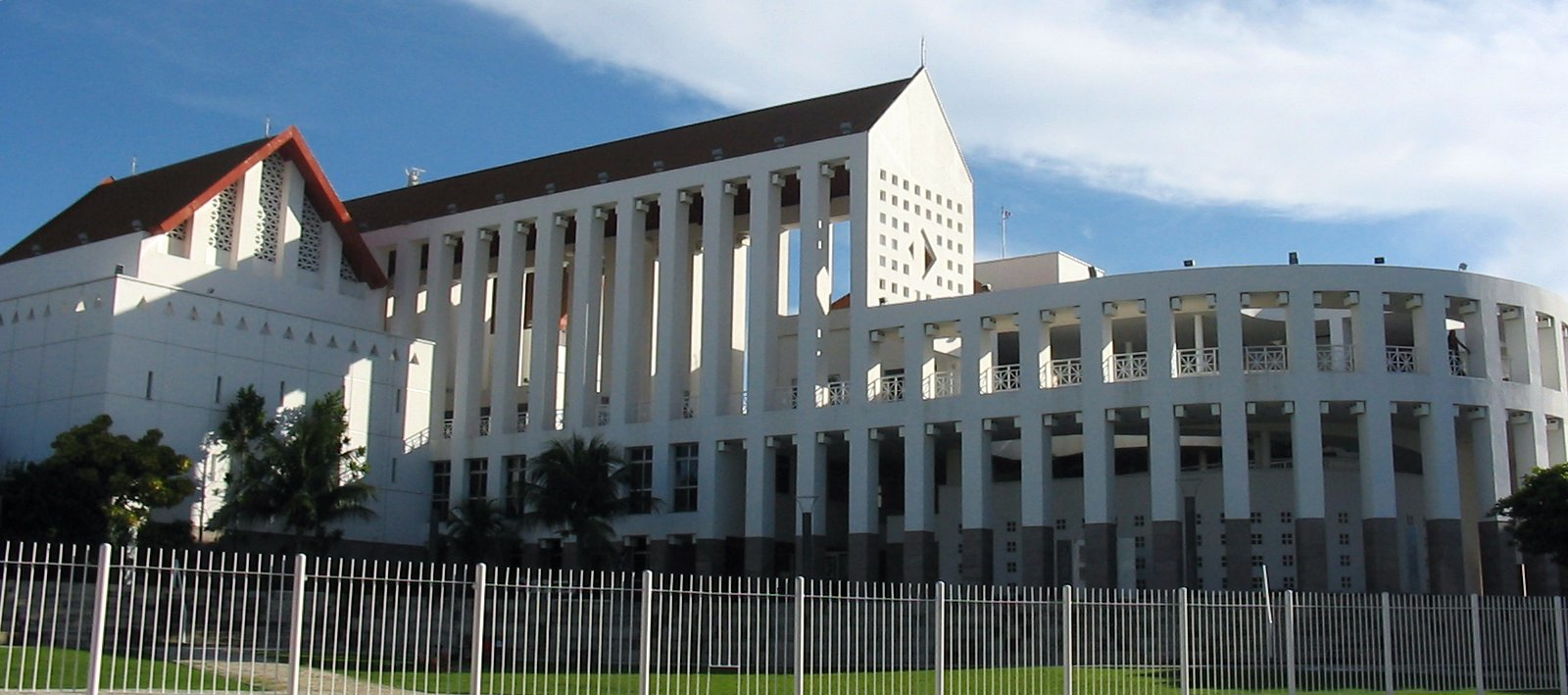
A view of the upper portion of the center.

The Dragão do Mar Center of Art And Culture congregates many spaces destinated to the realization of the most different activities, where the urban leisure, the production and diffusion of art and culture are the main focus.

On your almost 30 thousand square meters of area, includes spaces like Cearense Culture Memorial, the Contemporary Art Museum of Ceará, the Menezes Pimentel Public Library, a modern theater room, two cinema rooms, the Rubens de Azevedo Planetarium, the Sérgio Mota Open Theatre, an auditorium and classrooms.

- Menezes Pimentel Public Library: located on leisure and culture complex of the Dragão do Mar Center of Art and Culture, makes possible the entrance of the visitors by two ways, one by the Presidente Castelo Branco Avenue and the other by the main entrance of Dragão do Mar Center. An important research source for students, teachers and researchers, the Public Library Menezes Pimentel have a quantity composed by 70 thousand books and 40 thousand titles. It makes use of the fourth bigger quantity of Rare Titles of the country, where the 19th century newspaper collection and the 15th century book collection takes place.
- Cearense Culture Memorial The folk history, art and culture of Ceará could be saw in this equipment with 800 square meters, divided in six rooms.
- Contemporary Art Museum of Ceará: it occupies the place of two floors and have 700 square meters of area.
- Rubens de Azevedo Planetarium : built with German technology, is one of the most modern in the world, is the only one in Brazil that project the rainbow by 20 multimedia projectors. Have place for 90 people shows three sessions by day, propitiating big shows on the detailed observation of the stars, planets and galaxies.

== Location ==
The address of the center is Dragão do Mar street, 81, Praia de Iracema.

== Architecture ==
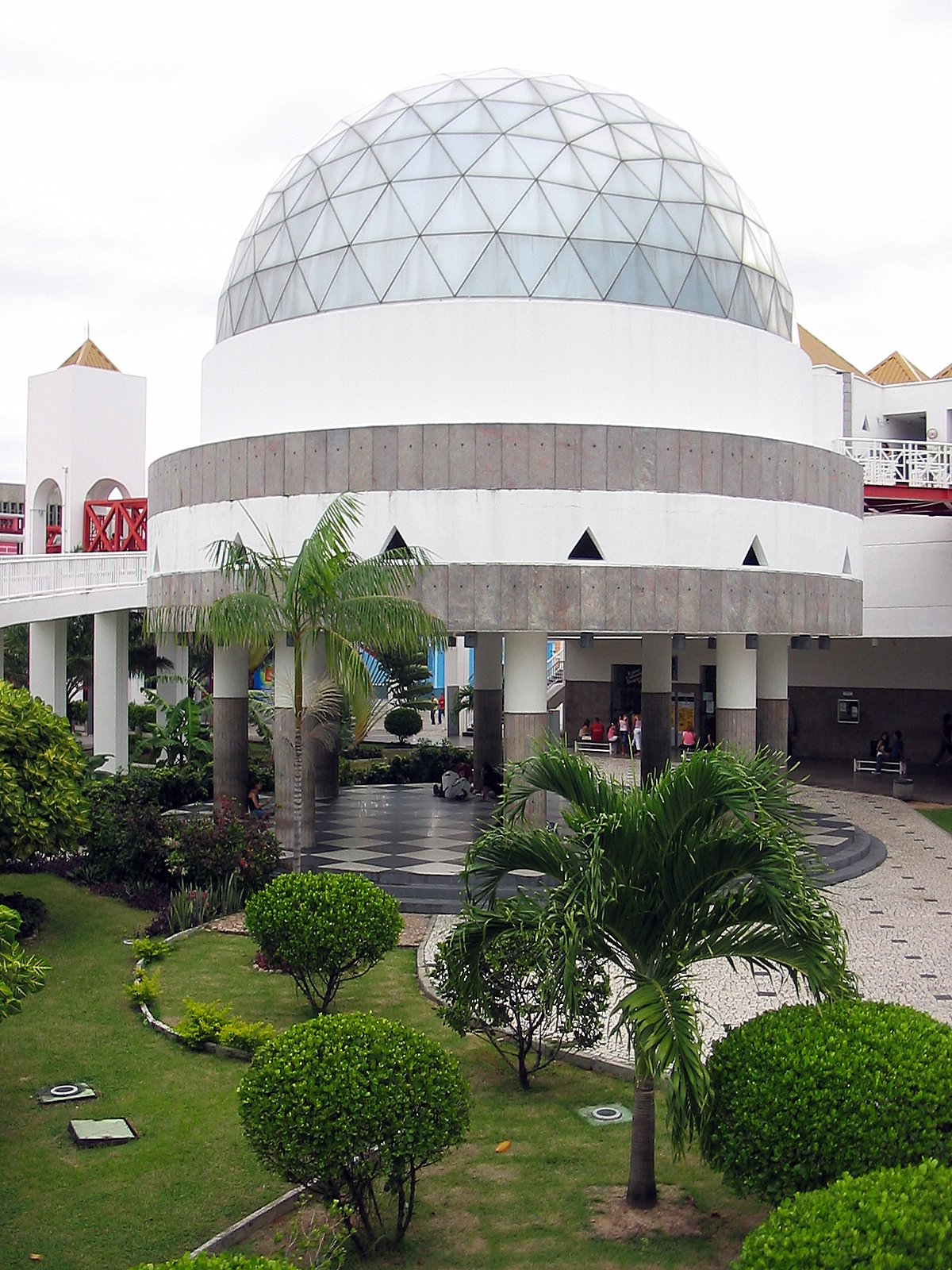
A view of the dome of the planetarium at the centre

The architecture of the Dragão do Mar Center is distinguished by its bold lines, created by architects Delberg Ponce de Leon and Fausto Nilo. Built in a former portuary area, the cultural center is surrounded by bars, restaurants and theaters. With its bold lines, it contrasts with the houses built in the early 20th century.
