= Nhundiaquara River =

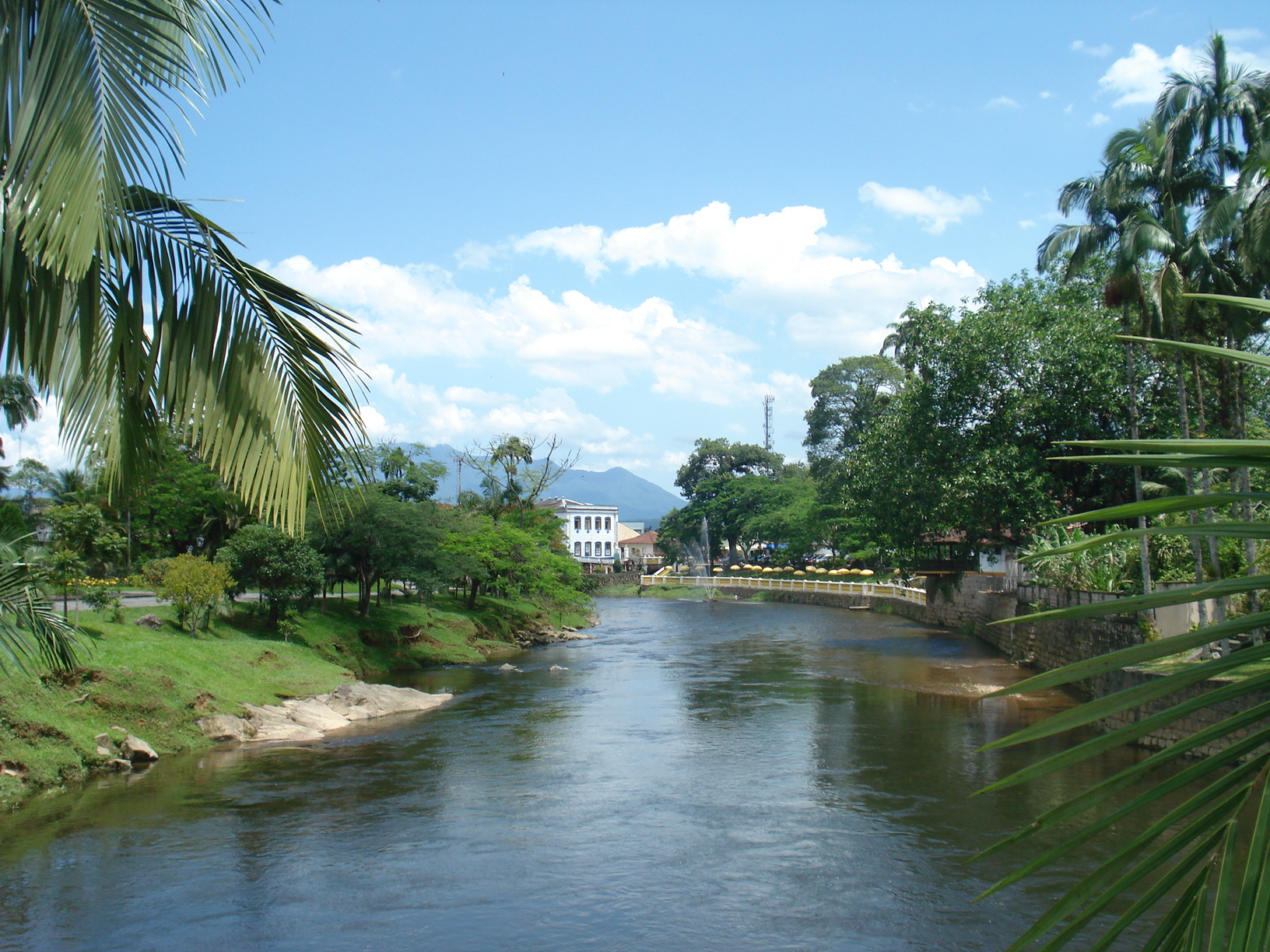
- Nhundiaquara river in Morretes, Paraná, Brazil
- Native name: Rio Nhundiaquara (Portuguese)

Location
- Country: Brazil

Physical characteristics
- Mouth
  - location: Paranaguá Bay
  - coordinates: 25°29′41.9″S 48°40′41.8″W
- Length: 37 km (23 mi)

Nhundiaquara River is a river located in the Serra do Mar, on the coast of Paraná in Brazil.

Nhundiaquara was first natural route linking the coast to the state plateaus. It was originally named Cubatão, being considered the richest gold river.

== See also ==
- List of rivers of Paraná
