= Piaçabuçu =

Municipality in Alagoas, Brazil

- Municipality
- The Municipality of Piaçabuçu
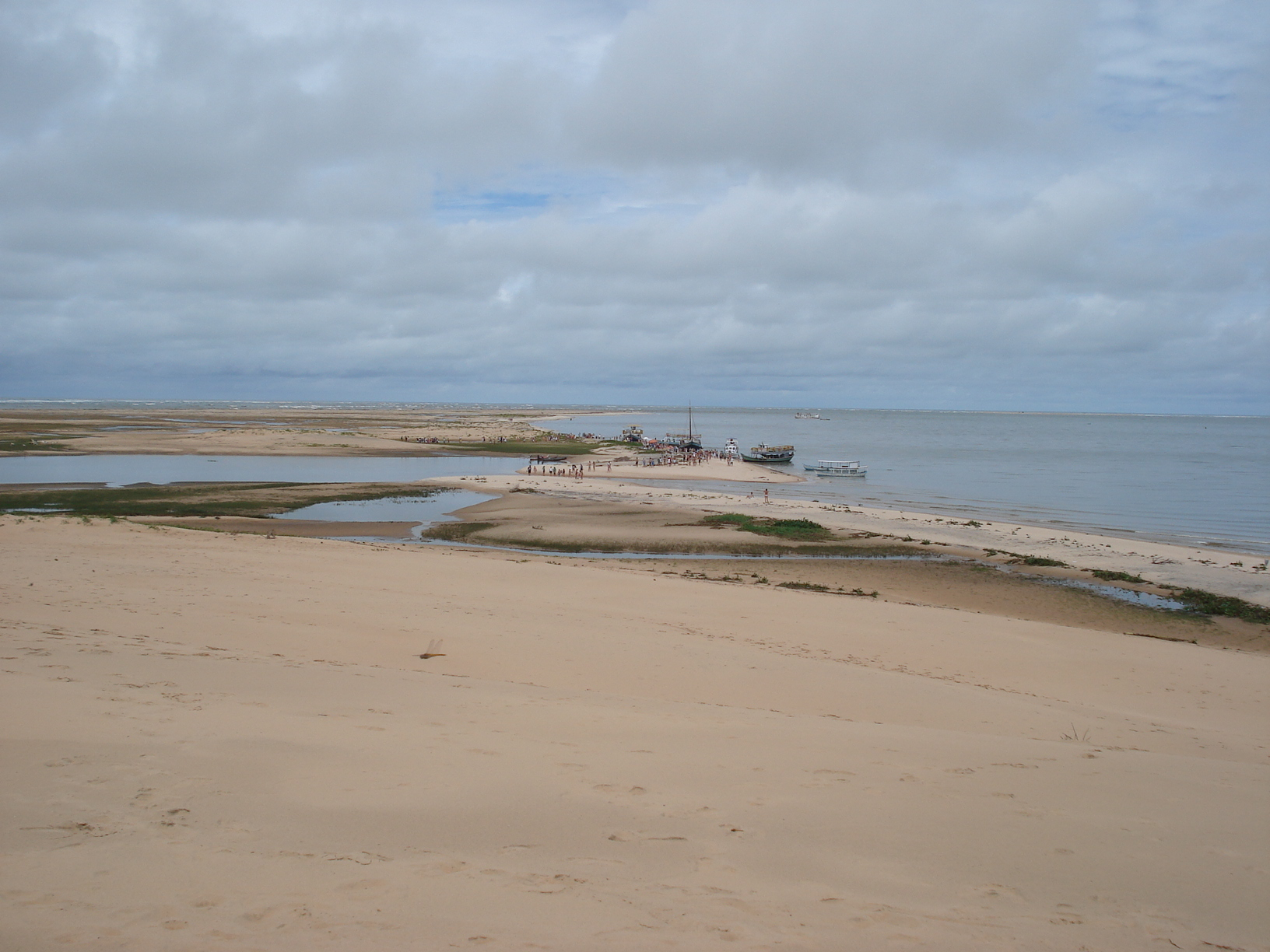
- Base level of Rio São Francisco.

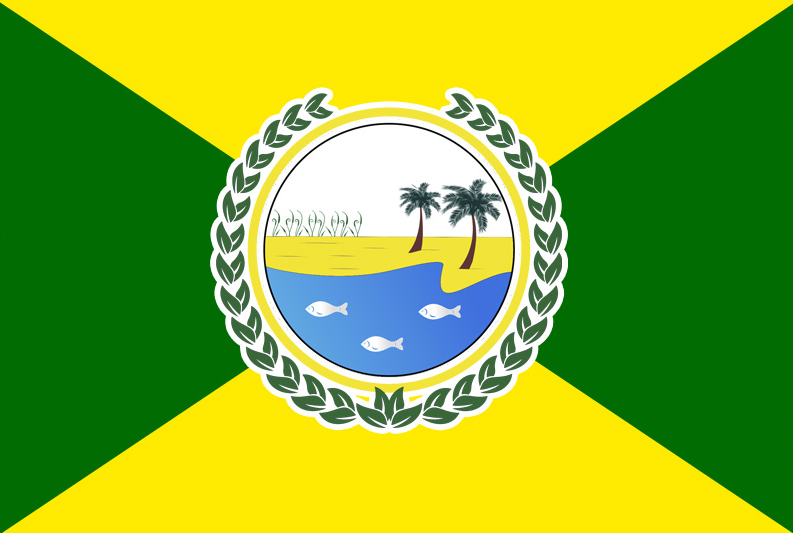
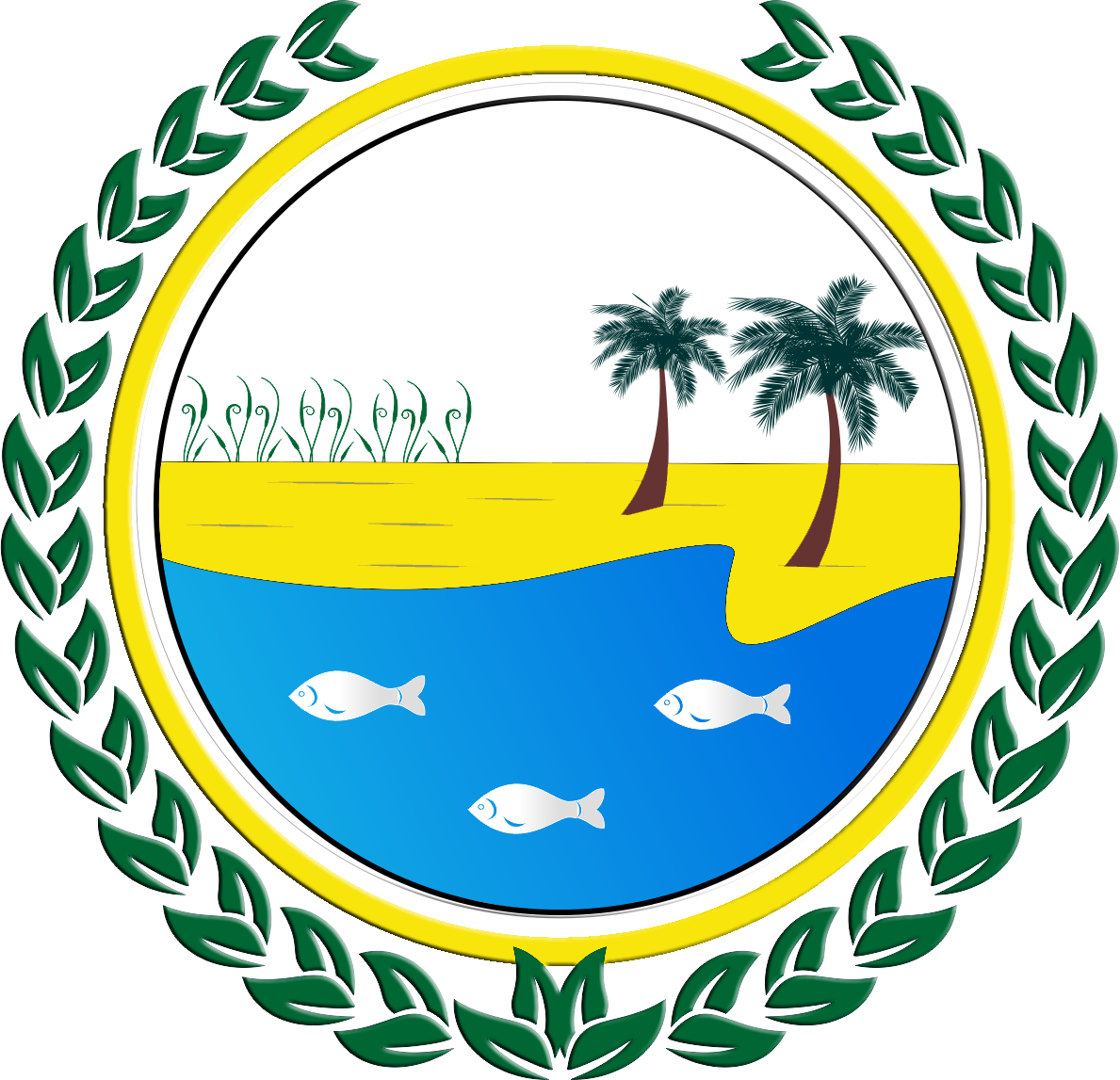
- Flag Seal
- Nickname: PBU
- Interactive map of Piaçabuçu
- Coordinates: 10°24′21″S 36°26′02″W
- Country: Brazil
- Region: Northeast
- State: Alagoas
- Founded: May 31, 1832

Government
  - Mayor: Dalmo Moreira Santana Júnior (PSB)

Area
  - Total: 242.9 km^{2} (93.8 sq mi)
- Elevation: 5 m (16 ft)

Population (2020)
  - Total: 17,848
  - Density: 82/km^{2} (210/sq mi)
- Time zone: UTC−3 (BRT)
- HDI (2000): 0.613 – medium

Piaçabuçu (Central northeastern portuguese pronunciation: [piɐˈsɐbʊˈsu]) is a municipality located in the Brazilian state of Alagoas. It is the southernmost municipality in Alagoas, and lies near both São Francisco River and the Atlantic Ocean. Its population was 17,848 (2020) and its area is 240 km^{2}.
