= Wire Opera House =

Coordinates: 25.3846°S 49.2761°W

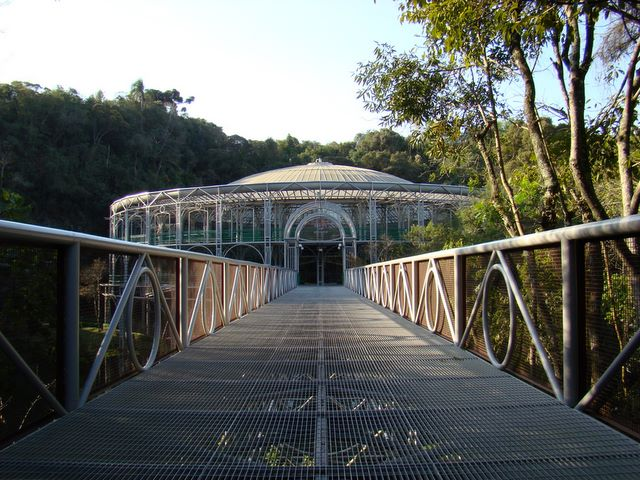
The façade.

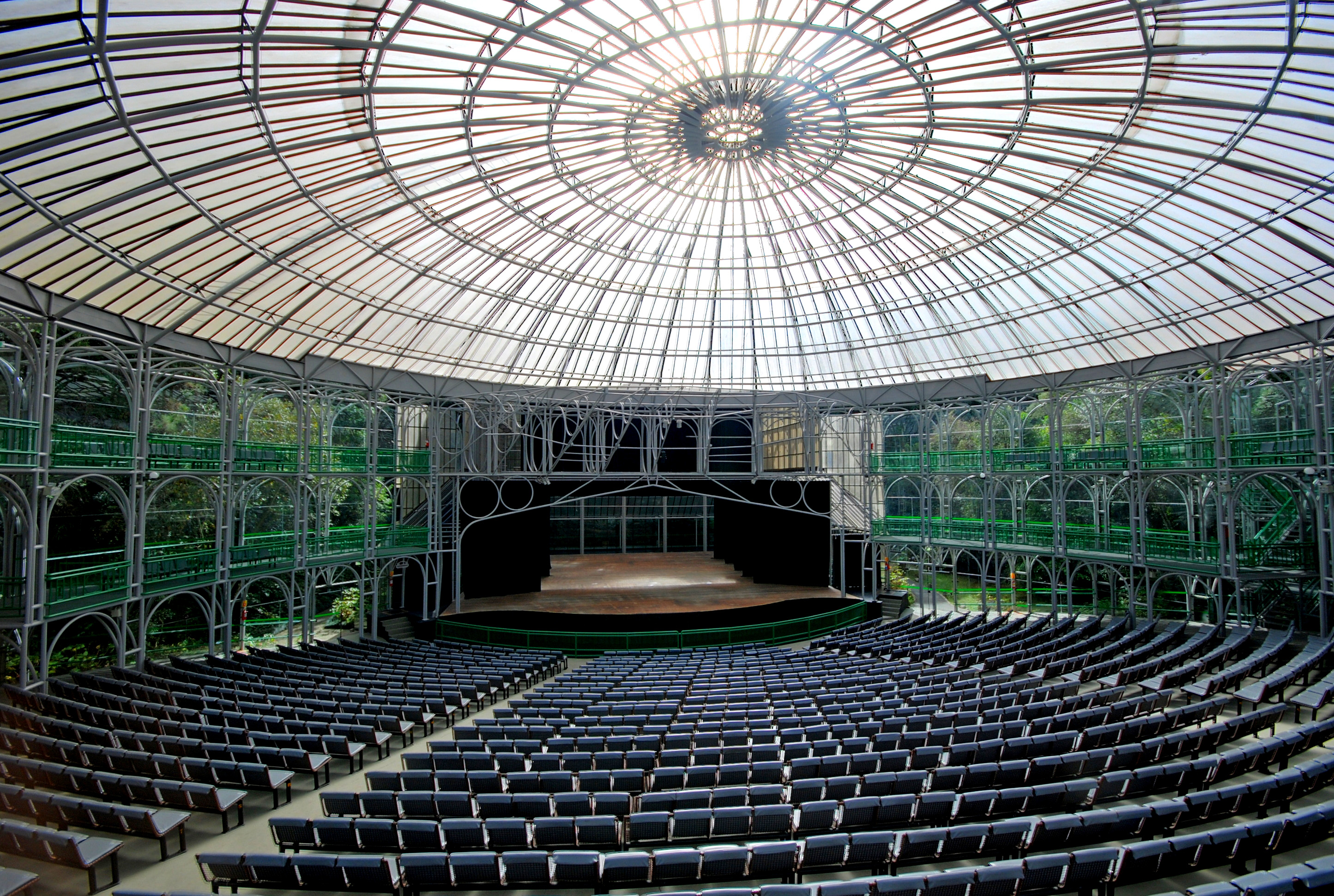
The Wire Opera House's auditorium.

The Ópera de Arame, in Portuguese, or the Wire Opera, in English, is a theatre house located in the city of Curitiba, the capital of the state of Paraná, in southern Brazil. It is one of the major tourist attractions of the city. The opera house has a capacity of 2,400 spectators.

Situated in the middle of an urban green park, Parque das Pedreiras ("Park of the Quarries"), the Wire Opera House theatre is built out of steel tubes. It is built on the site of a former rock quarry close to "Pedreira de Paulo Leminski." The structure was built in the center of an artificial lake and is accessed by a walkway. Designed by Domingos Bongestabs, the metallic structure weighs a total of 360 tons of steel. The structure was built in 75 days and opened on March 18, 1992. It underwent many changes until 2006. The idea in 1992 was to offer to the public an outdoor space, with a new and innovative perspective, where artists could present their music.

== See also ==
- List of concert halls
- List of opera houses
