= Arapuca =

Handcrafted trap used by the Guaraní for small prey

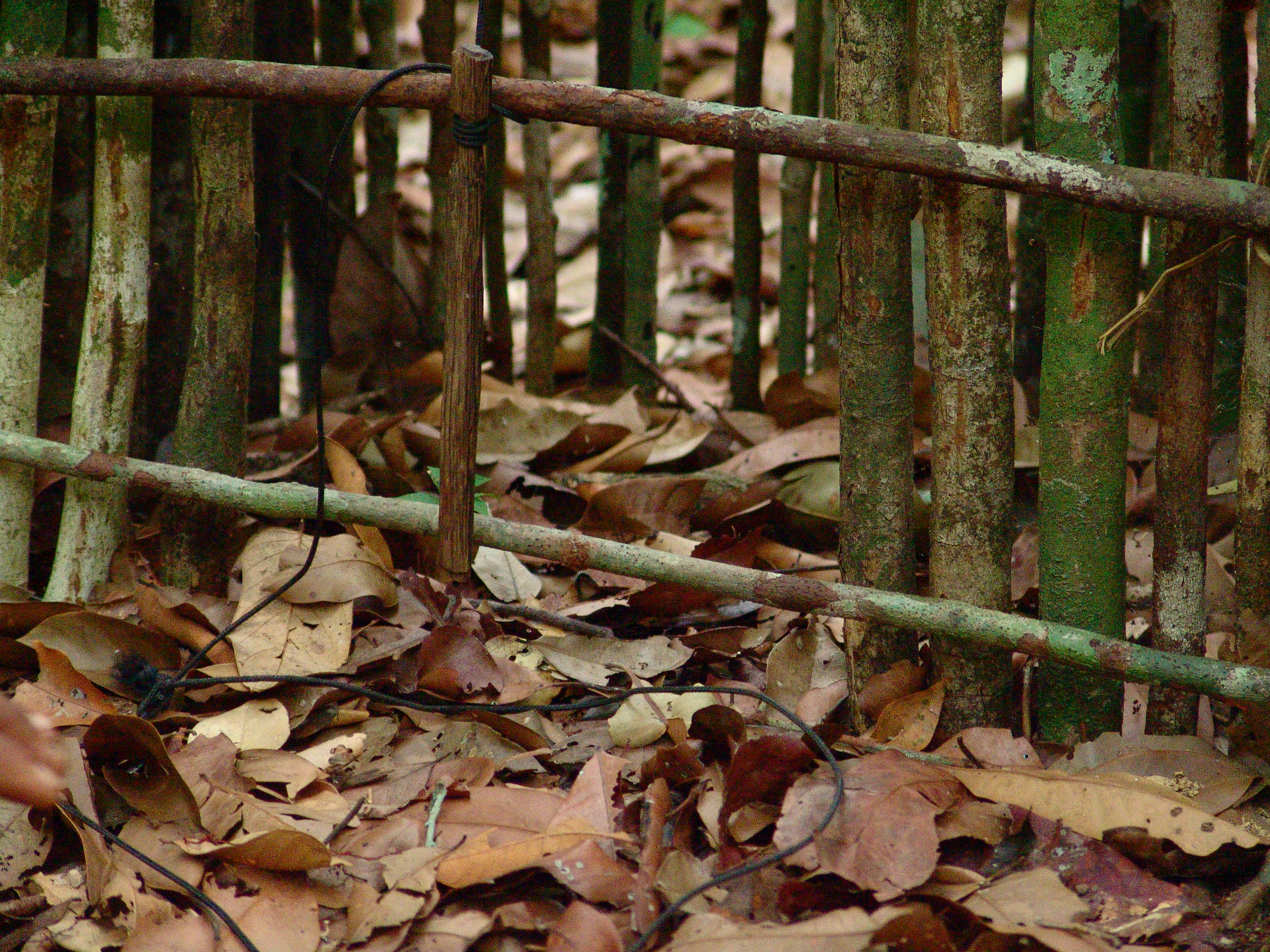
An arapuca

An arapuca (Brazilian Portuguese pronunciation: [a.ɾaˈpu.kɐ]) or aripuca is a handcrafted trap used by the Guaraní to catch birds, monkeys and other small animals. Its height is usually less than a meter, but there is a giant, 17-meter-tall reproduction of one of these traps in the touristic complex of La Aripuca, in the outskirts of the city of Puerto Iguazú, in Misiones, Argentina.

An arapuca is a pyramid built out of tied sticks, and it can trap live prey without hurting it. It is placed where the hunter knows the prey usually passes through or in its preferred habitat, along with small baits, like seeds or pieces of bread. When the animal steps on the right spot, the trap is triggered by its weight, dropping the pyramidal structure on top of it and preventing it from fleeing. The trigger is normally concealed under a layer of dried leaves and soil, taken from the same place so it will not look suspicious to the victim.
