= Parnamirim =

- Municipality
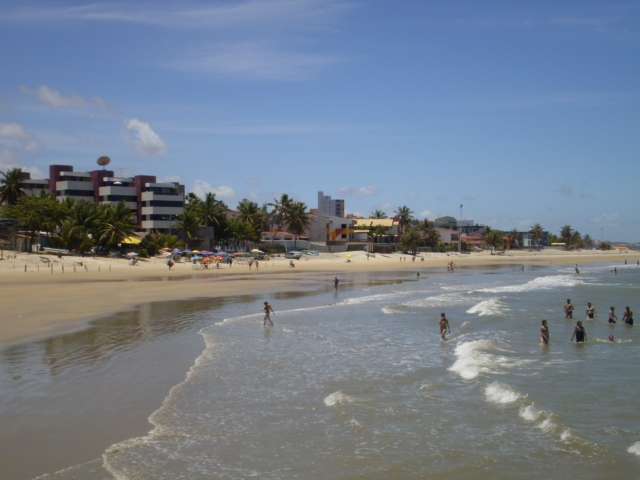
- Pirangi do Norte Beach

- Flag Coat of arms
- Nickname: "Trampolim da Vitória" ("Trampoline of Victory")
- Anthem
- Location of Parnamirim in the State of Rio Grande do Norte

- Location of Rio Grande do Norte in Brazil
- Coordinates: 5°55′S 35°15′W
- Country: Brazil
- State: Rio Grande do Norte
- Metropolitan region: Natal
- Adjacent municipalities: Natal (north), Macaíba (west), São José de Mipibu and Nísia Floresta (south), Atlantic Ocean (east)
- Distance to capital: 17 km
- Emancipation: December 17, 1958

Government
  - Mayor: Raimunda Nilda da Silva Cruz (Solidarity)
  - Term: 2025–2028
  - Councillors: 21

Area
  - Municipality: 124.006 km^{2} (47.879 sq mi)
  - Urban: 49.4703 km^{2} (19.1006 sq mi)
  - Rank: RN: 130th
- Elevation: 55 m (180 ft)

Population (2022 Brazilian census)
  - Municipality: 252,716
  - Estimate (2025): 271,713
  - Rank: RN: 3rd
- Demonym: Parnamirinense
- Time zone: UTC−3 (BRT)
- Postal code: 59140-000 to 59161-999
- Climate: Tropical savanna (As)
- HDI (UNDP/2010): 0.766
- HDI rank: RN: 1st
- Gini coefficient (2020): 0.55
- GDP (2021): R$ 6,845,402.65 thousand
- GDP rank: RN: 3rd/BRA: 214th
- GDP per capita (2021): R$ 25,121.67
- Website: www.parnamirim.rn.gov.br

Parnamirim is a Brazilian municipality in the state of Rio Grande do Norte, located 17 kilometers south of the state capital, Natal. Part of the Natal Metropolitan Region, it covers an area of 124 km² and had a population of 252,716 inhabitants according to the 2022 Brazilian Census, as reported by the Brazilian Institute of Geography and Statistics (IBGE), making it the third most populous municipality in the state, following Natal and Mossoró, and the 115th in Brazil. Conurbated with the capital, bordering it to the north, Parnamirim is experiencing significant economic growth, particularly in the real estate sector.

Emancipated from Natal in 1958, Parnamirim is internationally recognized as the "Trampoline of Victory" due to its historical ties to World War II, when it served as the site of the American airbase Parnamirim Field. Its strategic global location made it a key departure point for numerous American aircraft of all types, transporting troops to the African front. The significant presence of American soldiers influenced the local population, introducing their culture, stimulating the local economy, and even participating in the social life of residents at the time.

Parnamirim boasts the highest Human Development Index (HDI) among municipalities in Rio Grande do Norte, with a value of 0.766. It is home to the Barreira do Inferno Launch Center, the first rocket launch base in Brazil and South America. Tourist attractions such as the Cashew of Pirangi, the beaches of Cotovelo and Pirangi do Norte, and the hosting of events and music concerts during the high season, make the city one of the primary tourist destinations in Rio Grande do Norte.

== Etymology ==
The name Parnamirim comes from the Tupi term “Paranã-mirim,” which means "small river," derived from paranã ("large river; sea") and mirĩ ("small"). Although several rivers and streams still flow through the area corresponding to the municipality of Parnamirim, it is believed that the “Paranã-mirim” known to the Potiguar indigenous people, who inhabited the Captaincy of Rio Grande during the colonial period (17th century), referred to a watercourse that has since disappeared.

== History ==
=== Origins ===
The first land grants in the area now comprising Parnamirim date back to the 17th century. However, until the early 20th century, much of the region remained uninhabited and covered by dense forest. The exception was the valley of the Pium River, which had been settled since the first half of the 18th century. In 1881, the Natal-Nova Cruz Railway began operations, with its tracks passing through what is now the municipality, then part of Natal. Despite this, the area remained sparsely populated.

In the early 20th century, Portuguese immigrant Manuel Duarte Machado, who had resided in Natal since 1903, acquired a significant portion of the land that now forms the municipality. These lands stretched from the Guarapes plantation in Macaíba to the Cajupiranga plantation, which gave rise to the current neighborhood of the same name, and included the Pitimbu plantation, intersected by the river of the same name. The Pitimbu plantation was purchased from João Duarte da Silva and his wife, Joanna Leopoldina Duarte da Silva, while the Cajupiranga plantation belonged to Francisco Pereira de Brito and Maria Honorina de Cerqueira Brito.

In 1927, French pilot Paul Vachet visited Natal to select a site for an aerodrome, to be built by the French aviation company Compagnie Générale Aéropostale (CGA). The chosen site, approximately one thousand square meters in the Pitimbu plantation, was donated by Manuel Machado to Vachet, who transferred ownership to CGA via a deed. Construction of the aerodrome, which coincided with the rise of air transport in Brazil, took about three months, as stipulated in the contract, beginning on July 21, 1927. The first landing occurred at 11:45 p.m. on October 14, 1927, by the Nungesser-et-Coli aircraft, which departed from Saint-Louis, in what is now Senegal (then a French colony), bound for Natal. The trip across the Atlantic, which took more than 19 hours, was captained by Dieudonné Costes and Joseph Le Brix.

On September 27, 1928, the aerodrome also began receiving domestic flights, with the Laté-25 aircraft landing in Natal at dusk after departing from São Paulo. To improve access to the airfield, the Government of Rio Grande do Norte constructed a dirt road in the same year, starting at the Guarapes plantation and passing through the Natal-Nova Cruz Railway. The airfield was expanded in 1933 when Manuel Machado sold adjacent land to Air France, the French state-owned company that acquired CGA. Air France operated the airfield until June 1940, when France surrendered to Nazi Germany during World War II, and the aerodrome was decommissioned.

=== World War II ===
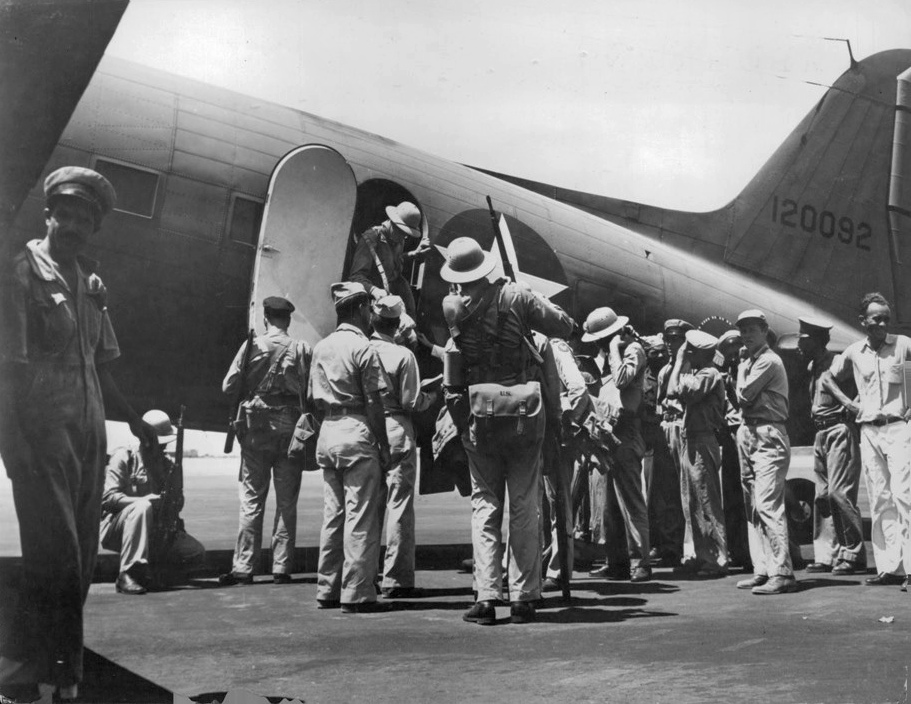
U.S. Army Air Forces fighter pilots disembarking at Parnamirim Field during World War II

In July 1941, Brazilian President Getúlio Vargas signed a mutual defense agreement allowing the United States to establish airbases in Northeast Brazil, including one in Natal. On March 2, 1942, Vargas enacted Decree-Law 4,142, transforming the former CGA airfield into the Natal Air Force Base (BANT). East of BANT, the United States constructed Parnamirim Field at a cost of US$9.5 million.

Approximately six thousand workers, mostly migrants from rural Rio Grande do Norte, participated in the construction of the new base. These workers rested in canvas tents set up west of the bases, forming the nucleus of a settlement that would become the modern city, as many workers established permanent residences there. The United States also contributed by building a 20-kilometer paved road connecting both BANT and Parnamirim Field to the Port of Natal, replacing the old dirt road. During the war, the Americans viewed their base as the vertex of a triangle known as the Trampoline of Victory, with its other points in North Africa and Southern Europe.

In October 1946, just over a year after the end of World War II, the United States handed Parnamirim Field over to the Brazilian Air Force (FAB), and the Natal Air Force Base began operating a passenger terminal. Meanwhile, the settlement south of Natal continued to grow, gaining its first health center and school in 1948. On December 23, 1948, the area was elevated to district status under State Law No. 146, authored by Deputy Antônio Soares Filho and sanctioned by Governor José Augusto Varela, with the support of Natal's mayor, Sylvio Pedroza. That same year, construction began on a chapel, which was halted in 1949 due to lack of funds and resumed in 1950. The chosen patron saint was Our Lady of Fátima.

On February 9, 1949, the new district, named Parnamirim, was officially established with the opening of a judicial registry and the appointment of its first notary, Otávio Gomes de Castro, who also founded the local branch of the Assembly of God on May 12, 1946. On November 24, 1951, BANT’s passenger station became the Augusto Severo International Airport, through Federal Law 1,473-A, enacted by Senate President Café Filho, a native of Natal. On April 1, 1952, the chapel of Our Lady of Fátima was elevated to parish status by the Bishop of Natal, Dom Marcolino Esmeraldo de Souza Dantas. The parish was inaugurated on the morning of April 26 with a mass led by BANT’s chaplain, Father João Correia de Aquino, who became the first parish priest.

Throughout the 1950s, the district of Parnamirim continued to develop. In 1958, State Deputy Gastão Mariz de Faria introduced a bill in the Legislative Assembly of Rio Grande do Norte to elevate the district to municipality status. The bill was approved and became State Law 2,325 on December 17, 1958, signed by Governor Dinarte Mariz (Gastão’s uncle), officially creating the municipality, detached from the capital.

=== From establishment to name change ===
The new municipality was formally established on January 10, 1959, when Deoclécio Marques de Lucena, a retired Brazilian Air Force lieutenant, was appointed as Parnamirim’s first mayor by the state governor. The inauguration ceremony took place at the Presidente Roosevelt School and was presided over by Otávio Gomes de Castro, the local notary for a decade. However, the new municipality did not meet the requirements of the time, as it had fewer than ten thousand inhabitants, the minimum required by the state constitution for creating new municipalities. Additionally, the local population disagreed with the municipal boundaries, as both BANT and the international airport, which had spurred the city’s growth, remained within Natal’s territory. Another territorial dispute involved the area now known as Passagem de Areia, which belonged to Macaíba and was separated from Parnamirim by the Natal-Recife Railway, as outlined in Article 2 of Law 2,325:

Article 2 – The boundary line of the new municipality shall follow that of the current district, defined as follows: To the north and east, starting from the Macaíba municipality boundary, at a point 500 meters north of the Peixe Boi site, it follows this line to the intersection with the Natal-Recife Railway; from there, it follows this line to the intersection with the Parnamirim-Jiqui highway; it follows this highway in a straight line, continuing in this direction to the coastline, then along the coast until reaching the boundary of Nísia Floresta, followed by São José de Mipibu, until reaching the intersection with Macaíba, between the intersection with São José de Mipibu, to the starting point of the northern boundary.

In November 1959, the first direct elections for mayor, deputy mayor, and councilors were held separately. Ilson Santos de Oliveira was elected mayor, taking office on February 1, 1960, and serving until January 31, 1964. However, his running mate for deputy mayor, Raimundo Barbosa de Souza, lost to Francisco Fernandes Pimenta, a political opponent. The Municipal Council saw ten councilors elected from four different parties, half of whom were affiliated with the National Democratic Union (UDN), the deputy mayor’s party. Approximately 1,200 people voted in the election.

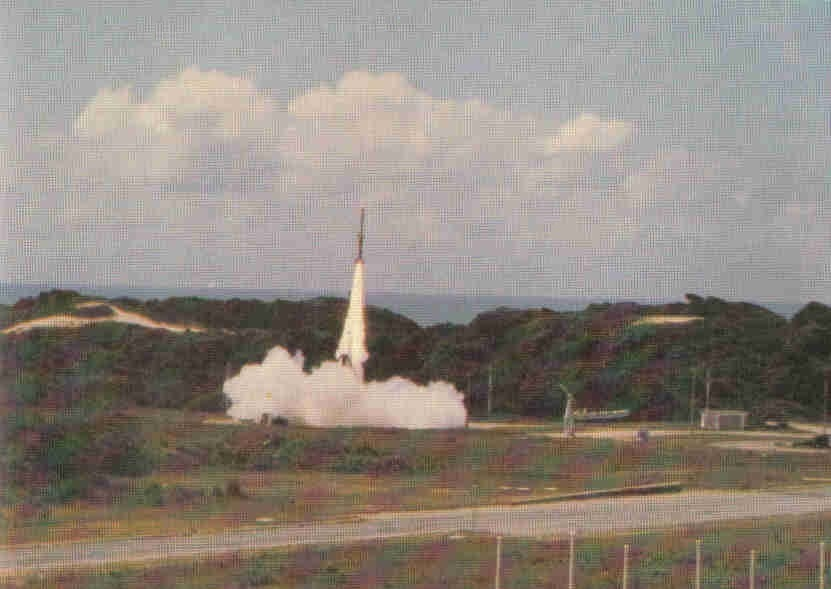
Nike-Apache, the first space rocket launched at the Barreira do Inferno Launch Center (CLBI) on December 15, 1965

On May 12, 1962, State Law 2,789, signed by Governor Aluízio Alves, partially resolved Parnamirim’s boundary disputes, except for Passagem de Areia, which remained part of Macaíba. The municipality’s area expanded to include the Taborda stream, and both the airbase and Augusto Severo Airport were transferred from Natal to Parnamirim, increasing its area to 92. From 1964, Parnamirim began receiving electricity from the Paulo Afonso Hydroelectric Complex in Bahia, replacing the generators previously operated at BANT.

On October 12, 1965, the Ministry of Aeronautics officially established the Barreira do Inferno Launch Center (CLBI) along the RN-063 (Rota do Sol), which, within a decade, earned Natal the title of Brazil’s Space Capital. In 1969, the municipality adopted its first flag, and on February 24, 1970, the Ministry of Aeronautics decommissioned the Natal Air Force Base, transforming it into a pilot training center. The 1970 census recorded Parnamirim’s population at 14,052, up from 8,826 in 1960.

In the early 1970s, during the administration of Mayor Antenor Neves de Oliveira (February 1, 1970 – January 31, 1973), the city implemented its first water supply system. On November 29, 1973, the FAB’s training center was redesignated as the Tactical Applications and Equipment Replenishment Center (CATRE), and on December 6, Parnamirim was renamed "Eduardo Gomes" in reference to the Aeronautics Minister who attended the CLBI’s inauguration. This change, supported by the military, was enacted through State Law 4,278, authored by Deputy Moacyr Duarte, approved by the Legislative Assembly of Rio Grande do Norte, and signed by Governor Cortez Pereira, without consulting the local population, which opposed the renaming.

=== 1974–present ===
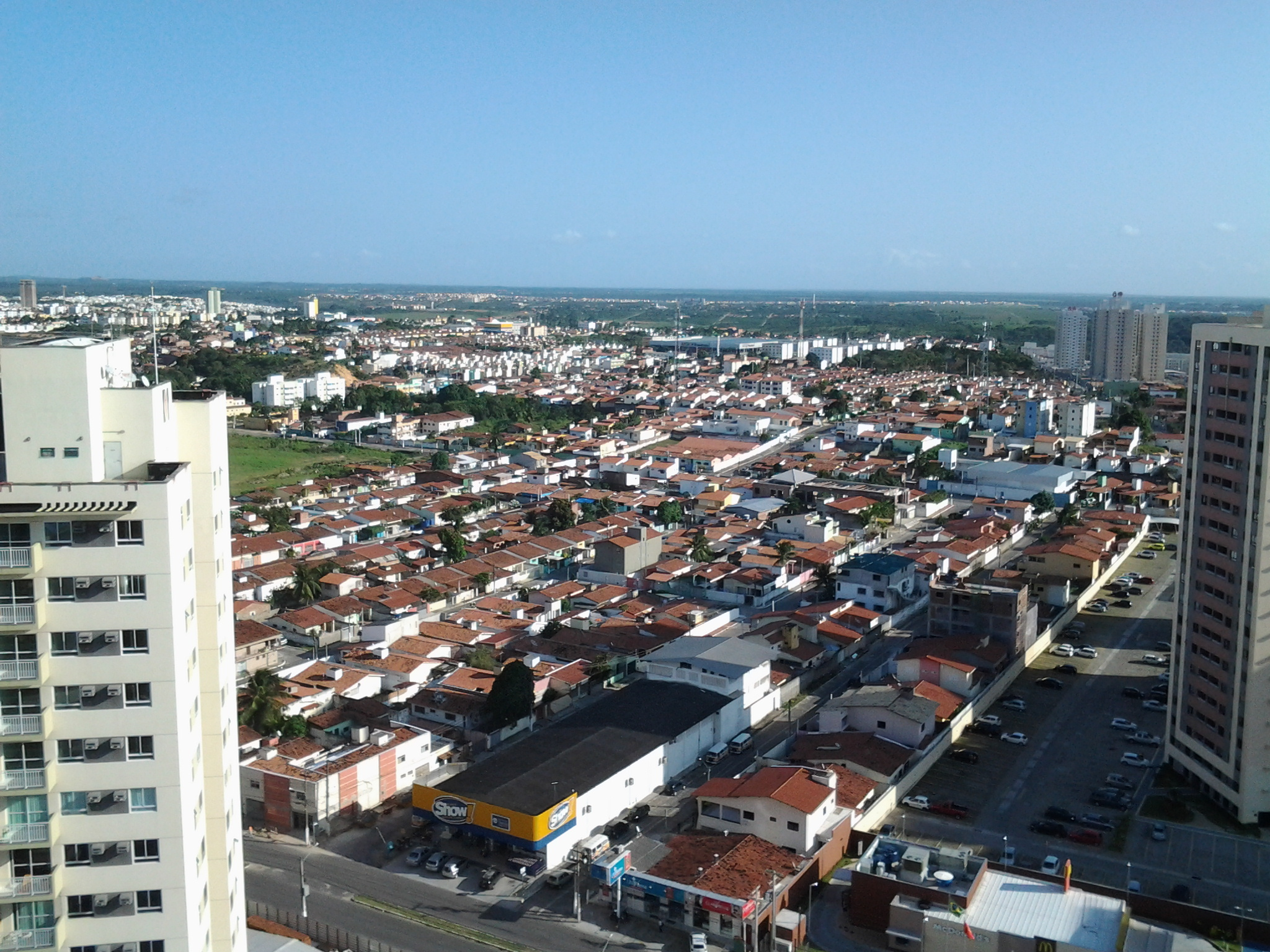
Nova Parnamirim, a neighborhood conurbated with Natal, which, alongside its neighbor Emaús, has driven significant urban and population growth in the municipality since the late 1980s.

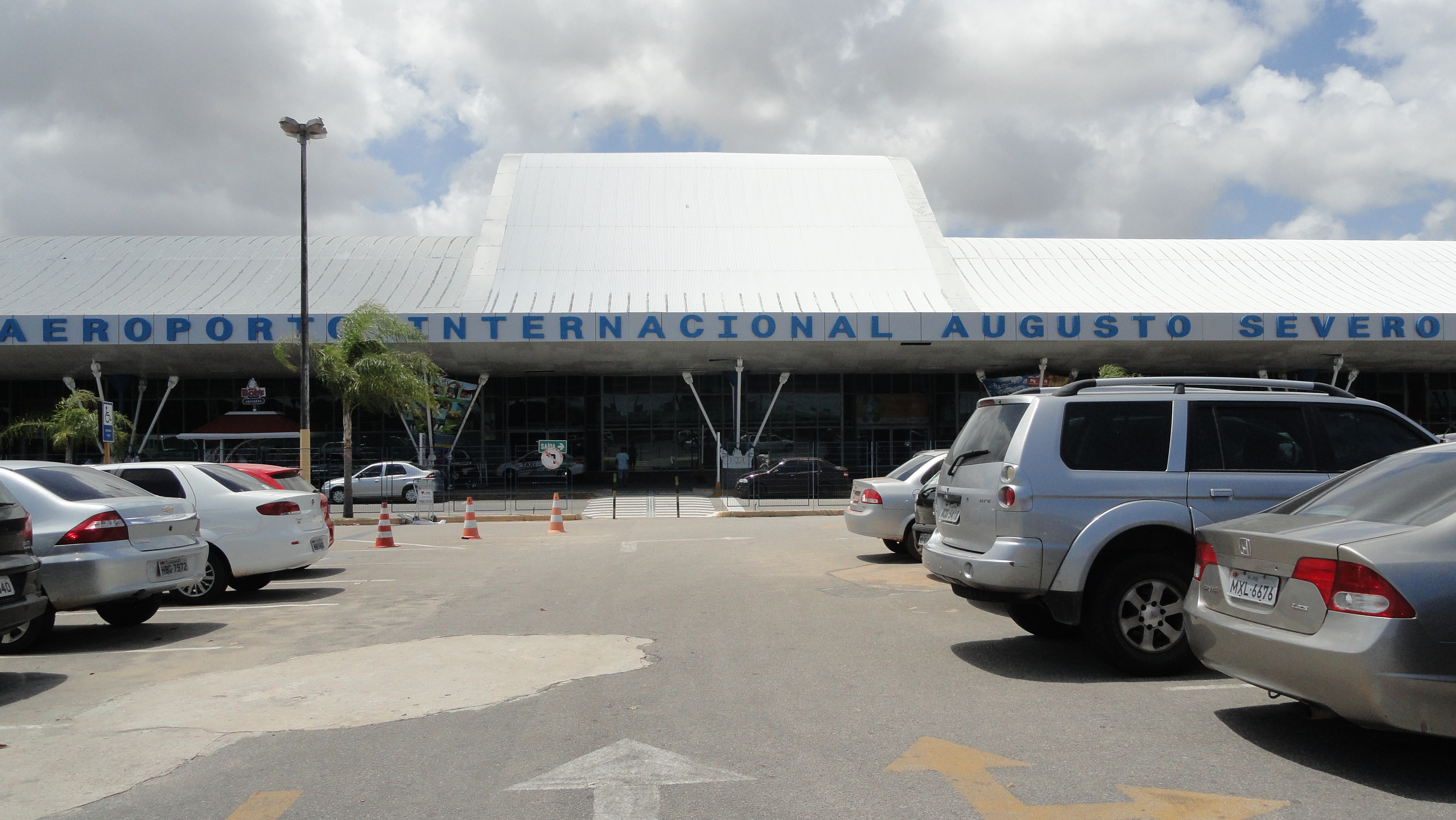
The former Augusto Severo International Airport, decommissioned for civil aviation and commercial aviation in 2014, when it was replaced by the Governador Aluízio Alves International Airport

In 1974, after years of dispute, Passagem de Areia was transferred from Macaíba to Parnamirim, establishing the municipality’s current boundaries. On June 1, 1976, the city gained a state judicial forum and held its first trial, a historic jury composed entirely of women. That year also saw a highly contentious election, ultimately won by former mayor Antenor Neves, who was sworn in for a second term on February 1, 1977. His term, initially set for four years, was extended by two years due to a constitutional amendment, lasting until January 31, 1983.

Neves was succeeded by physician Sadi Mendes Sobreira, known as "the doctor of the poor." However, during his term, he suffered a stroke and died on January 4, 1984. His deputy, Fernando Bandeira de Melo, assumed office until the term ended on December 31, 1988. In 1987, a popular movement led by José Siqueira de Paiva, with 4,665 petition signatures, prompted the assembly to restore the city’s original name. The proposal, presented by Deputy Ruy Barbosa, was approved on June 25, but the change was only formalized on August 6, when the law was published.

On May 23, 1989, a municipal law created the district of Nova Parnamirim, now a neighborhood of the same name, bordering Natal and separated from the city center by the Augusto Severo Airport area, which also includes the Barreira do Inferno Launch Center. In 1990, the Tactical Applications and Equipment Replenishment Center was renamed by the FAB to the Air Training Command, retaining the CATRE acronym, before reverting to the Natal Air Force Base in December 2001. By 1991, Parnamirim became the third most populous municipality in Rio Grande do Norte, with 63,312 inhabitants, more than double the 1980 census figure of 26,362, when it ranked tenth.

In 1996, the municipality established a state military police battalion, and in 2000, with a population of 124,690, it instituted the Parnamirim Master Plan, a foundational urban policy document. In 2004, Nova Parnamirim was officially designated a neighborhood, incorporating Parque do Pitimbu and Parque dos Eucaliptos as housing estates. Throughout the decade, Parnamirim continued its demographic expansion, extending its urban area toward neighboring municipalities Macaíba and São José de Mipibu, reaching 202,456 inhabitants in 2010, a growth of over 60% from 2000, nearly five times higher than Natal’s growth of just over 12% in the same period.

On May 31, 2014, the Augusto Severo International Airport was decommissioned for civil aviation and commercial aviation and returned to the FAB, operating exclusively for military aviation. It was replaced by the Governador Aluízio Alves International Airport in São Gonçalo do Amarante.

== Geography ==

According to the 2017 territorial division by the Brazilian Institute of Geography and Statistics (IBGE), Parnamirim falls within the intermediate and immediate geographic regions of Natal. Previously, under the mesoregions and microregions of Brazil framework, it was part of the Natal microregion, within the East Potiguar mesoregion. Parnamirim spans a territorial area of 124.006, accounting for 0.2348% of the state’s surface, with 49.4703 constituting its urban area. It is part of the Natal Metropolitan Region and is conurbated with the state capital, bordering it to the north. To the south, it borders Nísia Floresta and São José de Mipibu, to the west with Macaíba, and is bathed to the east by the Atlantic Ocean, with 11.9 of coastline, comprising the beaches of Cotovelo and Pirangi do Norte.

The terrain of the municipality features altitudes up to 100 meters and is partially situated within the Brazilian coastal plain, characterized by dunes shaped by wind action. Further inland lie the coastal tablelands, composed of clay and significantly altered by human activity. Parnamirim is located within the area of rocks from the Barreiras Group, formed during the Upper Tertiary period and primarily covered by paraconglomerates of flint and quartz. These rocks also form the cliffs along the coast. The soils in Parnamirim are deep, porous, well-drained, and vary in texture, consisting of sand (neosoils or quartz sands, covering most of the territory) or clay (latosols, specifically dystrophic red-yellow), but exhibit low fertility.

Parnamirim lies within the Atlantic Forest biome, with species characterized by dense, slender trunks that are semi-evergreen, retaining leaves for most of the year. Common species in the municipality include the cashew tree, sandpaper tree, Brazilwood, pitombeira, and sapucaia. However, much of the original vegetation has been cleared due to urban expansion, through the creation of subdivisions, leaving only scattered remnants, some protected by the master plan, including the Cashew of Pirangi, once considered the world’s largest cashew tree, and the Jiqui Lagoon. The fauna includes at least 98 species of birds, 70 arthropods, 17 mammals, nine amphibians, and six fish.

Over 80% of Parnamirim’s territory lies within the watershed of the Pirangi River, with the remaining less than 20% part of the diffuse drainage eastern coastal strip. Two rivers flow through the municipality: the Pium River, originating at the border with Nísia Floresta and emptying into the Atlantic Ocean, and the Pitimbu River, which begins in Macaíba, crosses the Natal neighborhood of Pitimbu, from which it takes its name, and flows into Parnamirim at the Jiqui Lagoon, located in the Nova Parnamirim neighborhood and contributing to the water supply for the southern and eastern zones of Natal. The local hydrography also includes the Água Vermelha, Cajupiranga, Lamarão, Mendes, and Ponte Velha streams.

The climate is tropical savanna, classified as As, with rain concentrated between March and July and an annual precipitation index exceeding 1,500 millimeters (mm). However, lightning occurrences are rare, with a density of only 0.219 strikes/km²/year.

Climate data for Parnamirim
Month	Jan	Feb	Mar	Apr	May	Jun	Jul	Aug	Sep	Oct	Nov	Dec	Year
Mean daily maximum °F	92.1	90.5	92.3	91.8	91.0	90	88.3	87.4	89.4	91.0	89.8	91.8	92.3
Mean daily minimum °F	72.7	72.3	72.1	72.0	70.0	70	67.3	65.5	67.3	68.5	70.7	73.0	65.5
Average precipitation inches	3.71	4.44	7.43	8.31	8.50	11.30	8.97	4.40	1.87	0.60	0.66	1.08	61.29
Mean daily maximum °C	33.4	32.5	33.5	33.2	32.8	32	31.3	30.8	31.9	32.8	32.1	33.2	33.5
Mean daily minimum °C	22.6	22.4	22.3	22.2	21.1	21	19.6	18.6	19.6	20.3	21.5	22.8	18.6
Average precipitation mm	94.3	112.9	188.8	211.2	215.9	286.9	227.9	111.8	47.6	15.3	16.7	27.4	1,556.7
Source: EMPARN (temperature records: July 28, 2020–present; precipitation averages: 1995–2020)

== Demography ==
Historical population
Year	Pop.	±%
1960	8,826	—
1970	14,502	+64.3%
1980	26,362	+81.8%
1991	63,312	+140.2%
2000	124,690	+96.9%
2010	202,456	+62.4%
2022	252,716	+24.8%
Source: IBGE

The development of Greater Natal has drawn people to Parnamirim from other parts of Rio Grande do Norte and Brazil. This phenomenon can be attributed to the greater capacity of municipalities such as Parnamirim, which are located within the metropolitan region encompassing Natal, to assimilate newcomers seeking employment opportunities in the state capital. Many new residents settle in areas near the capital, leading to a conurbation between the two cities.

Although Extremoz, another municipality in the metropolitan region, recorded the highest percentage population growth in the state between the 2010 Brazilian Census and the 2022 Brazilian Census (over 150%), Parnamirim saw the largest absolute growth, rising from 202,456 inhabitants in 2010 to 252,716 in 2022. In both censuses, it remained the third most populous municipality in Rio Grande do Norte, surpassed only by Natal and Mossoró, with a geometric growth rate of 1.87% per year during this period. The population density was 2,037.93, and the sex ratio was 89.26 (8,926 men per 10,000 women), with 52.84% female and 47.16% male. According to the same census, 46.76% of the population identified as White, 45.18% as Pardos, and 7.77% as Blacks, with small minorities of Asians (0.15%) and Indigenous (0.14%).

Population distribution (2022)
District	Population	% of total
Parnamirim (seat)	243,612	96.4
Pium	4,205	1.66
Pirangi do Norte	3,486	1.38
Cotovelo	1,413	0.55
Total	252,716	100

In the 2010 census, the last to publish data on religion, 62.99% of residents were Roman Catholics, 23.73% Evangelicals, and 2.13% Spiritists. Another 8.51% reported no religion, with other denominations accounting for 2.64%. Within the Roman Catholic Church, Parnamirim belongs to the Archdiocese of Natal and has Our Lady of Fátima as its patroness. Various Protestant or Reformed denominations are also present, with the Assembly of God, Baptist Church, and Universal Church of the Kingdom of God being the main ones.

Parnamirim holds the highest Human Development Index (HDI-M) in Rio Grande do Norte. In 2010, according to the United Nations Development Programme (UNDP), its HDI was 0.766, ranking 274th in Brazil. Specifically, the longevity index was 0.825, the income index was 0.750, and the education index was 0.726. In the same year, 88.2% of the population lived above the poverty line, 8.2% between the indigence and poverty lines, and 3.7% below the indigence line, with a Gini coefficient, measuring economic inequality, of 0.55. The wealthiest 20% contributed 59.7% of municipal income, while the poorest 20% contributed only 3%. Between 2000 and 2010, the percentage of the population with a per capita household income below 140 reais fell from 27% to 11.8%, a 56.2% reduction.

== Politics and subdivisions ==
As a municipality, Parnamirim has two branches of government: the executive branch, represented by the mayor and their cabinet of secretaries, and the legislative branch, represented by the municipal chamber, composed of 18 councilors. The chamber is responsible for drafting and voting on fundamental laws for administration and the executive, particularly the municipal budget, known as the Budget Guidelines Law. Parnamirim is governed by its organic law, enacted on April 2, 1990, and serves as the seat of an intermediate-level state judicial district. According to the Superior Electoral Court (TSE), the municipality had 134,254 voters in May 2022, representing 4.703% of Rio Grande do Norte’s electorate.

Parnamirim consists of its seat and three districts, established by Municipal Law 841/1994: Cotovelo, Pirangi do Norte, and Pium, collectively forming the Coastal District. The seat comprises 22 neighborhoods, 13 of which were instituted by Law 783/1993. There is also a military area housing the Natal Air Force Base and the former Augusto Severo International Airport. The most populous neighborhood is Nova Parnamirim, bordering Natal, initially created as a district in 1989 and dissolved in 1993, when it was split into the Parque do Pitimbu and Parque dos Eucaliptos neighborhoods. Both became housing estates of Nova Parnamirim in 2004, when it was officially designated a neighborhood. It had 60,960 inhabitants in the 2022 Brazilian Census. The newest neighborhoods are Parque das Árvores and Encanto Verde, established in 2013 and 2016, respectively.

Neighborhoods and districts of Parnamirim
Neighborhoods		Neighborhoods
1	Bela Parnamirim	14	Parque das Nações
2	Boa Esperança	15	Parque de Exposições
3	Cajupiranga	16	Parque do Jiqui
4	Centro	17	Passagem de Areia
5	Cohabinal	18	Rosa dos Ventos
6	Emaús	19	Santa Tereza
7	Encanto Verde	20	Santos Reis
8	Jardim Planalto	21	Vale do Sol
9	Liberdade	22	Vida Nova
10	Monte Castelo	Districts
11	Nova Esperança	23	Cotovelo
12	Nova Parnamirim	24	Pirangi do Norte
13	Parque das Árvores	25	Pium
Note: Unnumbered areas do not belong to any neighborhood or district.

== Economy ==
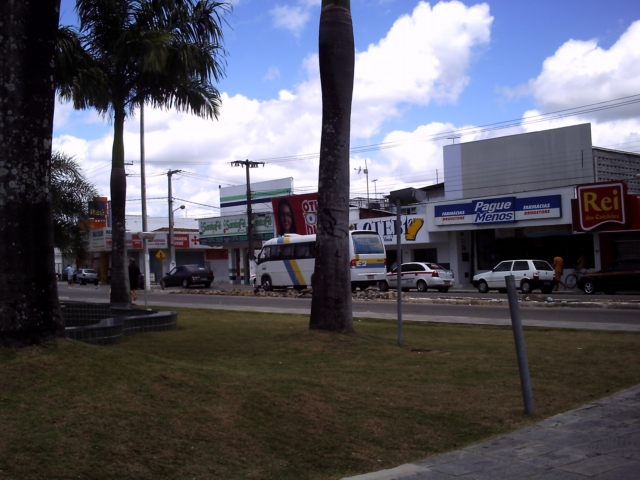
Shops on Brigadeiro Everaldo Breves Avenue, in downtown Parnamirim

Parnamirim’s gross domestic product (GDP) is the third largest in the state, surpassed only by Natal and Mossoró, and the second largest in its microregion, surpassed only by Natal. According to 2011 IBGE data, the municipality’s GDP was R$ 2,709,922 thousand, of which 429,357 thousand came from net product taxes minus subsidies. The GDP per capita was R$ 13,001.84.

Agriculture contributes the least to Parnamirim’s economy, with 20,982 thousand reais of the city’s GDP from the gross value added of agriculture. According to the IBGE in 2009, the municipality had a herd of 7,580 cattle, 160 horses, 1,590 pigs, 680 goats, 22 donkeys, 55 mules, 1,510 sheep, and 411,594 poultry, including 219,471 hens and 192,123 roosters, broilers, and chicks. In 2009, the city produced 2.603 million liters of milk from 2,410 cows. It also produced 4,326 dozen chicken eggs and 56 thousand dozen quail eggs. In temporary agriculture, the main products are maize (86 tons), cassava (1,968 tons), beans (146 tons), and sugarcane (14,520 tons).

The industry is currently the second most significant sector for the municipality’s economy, contributing 310,041 reais to the GDP from the gross value added of the industrial sector. Much of this comes from the Industrial District, located along the BR-101 highway, which hosts various companies across different sectors, including the first Coca-Cola factory in Brazil. It is a mixed industrial district with small, medium, and large enterprises.

The service sector generates 1,081.317 reais to the municipal GDP, making it the largest contributor to the city’s economy. According to the IBGE, the city had 2,958 local units, 2,890 companies, and 55,994 workers in 2008. Of those workers, 29,678 were employed and 26,316 were salaried. Wages and other remunerations totaled 332,401 reais, with an average monthly wage of 2.4 minimum wages.

== Infrastructure ==
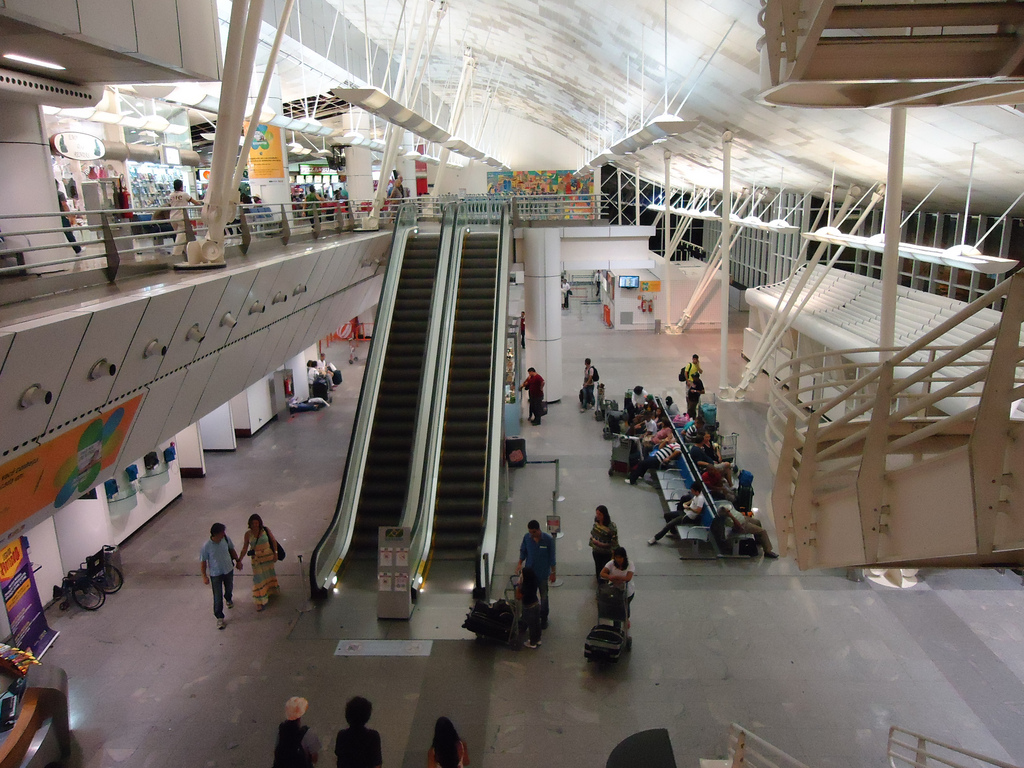
Terminal of Augusto Severo International Airport in January 2013, when it was still operational. At the time, its terminal was rated as the third best in the country.

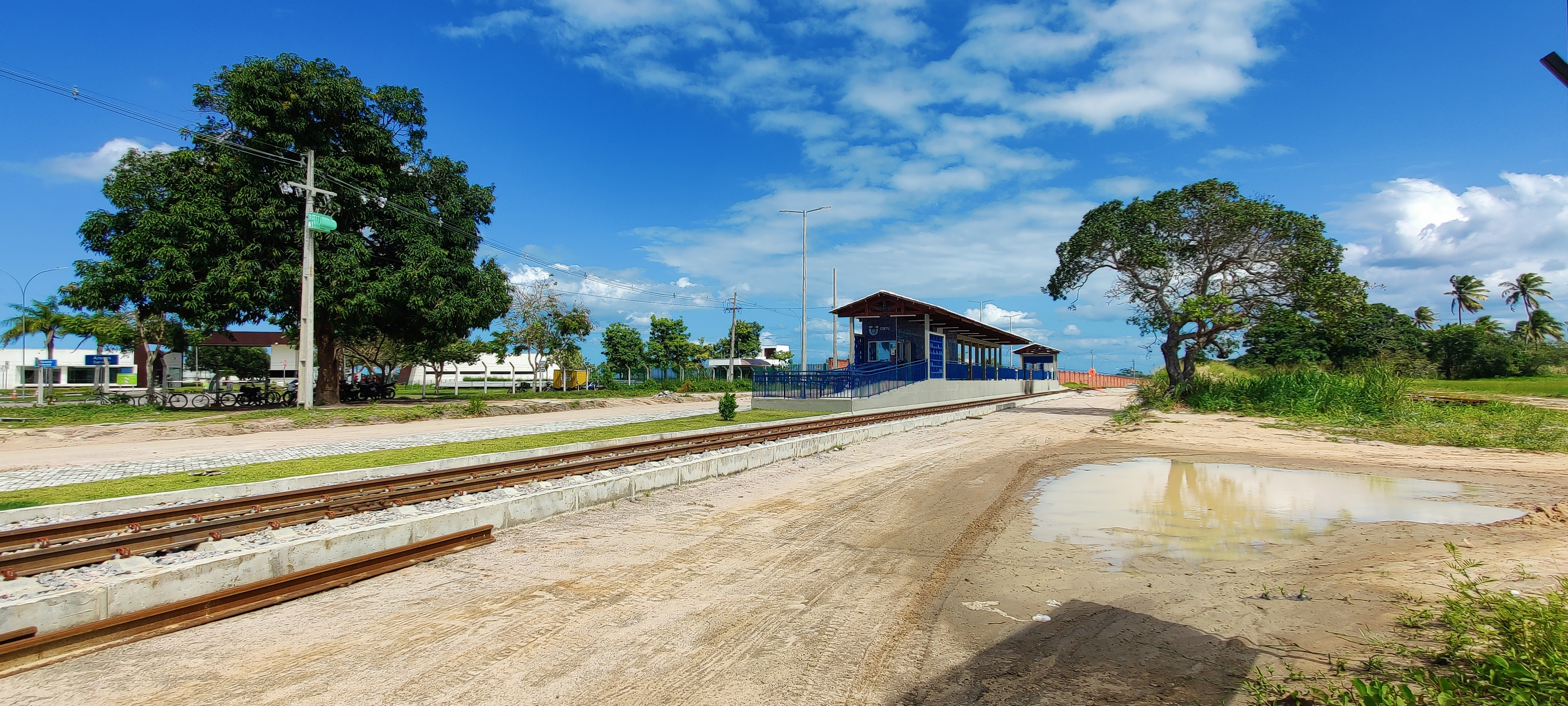
Cajupiranga Station, operational since late July 2022, part of the South Line of the Natal Urban Train System.

In 2010, the municipality had 99.48% of its 60,344 households with piped water, 99.81% with electricity, and 98.81% with waste collection. According to the latest National Basic Sanitation Survey (PNSB) conducted in 2017, Parnamirim's water supply network spanned 333 kilometers, with 79,206 connections or service units, of which 76,347 were residential. On average, 66,022 m³ of water was treated, but only 31,373 reached consumption points, resulting in a loss rate of 52.5%. The daily per capita consumption was 396.1 liters per service unit. In contrast, the sewage collection network extended only 31 kilometers, with an average of 1,096 m³ treated.

Both water supply and sewage treatment services in Parnamirim are managed by the Rio Grande do Norte Water and Sewage Company (CAERN), which operates two offices in the city. The electricity supply is handled by the Rio Grande do Norte Energy Company (COSERN), part of the Neoenergia Group, which serves all municipalities in Rio Grande do Norte. The nominal voltage of the electrical grid is 220 volts. Four mobile phone operators provide coverage: Claro, Oi, TIM, and Vivo, with 084 as the area code (DDD). According to the latest census, 60.67% of households had only a mobile phone, 33.72% had both a mobile and landline phone, 1.43% had only a landline, and 4.17% had neither. The postal code (CEP) ranges from 59140-001 to 59161-999.

The municipal vehicle fleet in 2020 included 62,809 cars, 28,621 motorcycles, 7,048 pickup trucks, 3,860 SUVs, 2,527 utility vehicles, 2,389 trucks, 2,288 scooters, 1,699 trailers, and 3,012 in other categories, totaling 114,253 vehicles. In terms of road transport, Parnamirim is traversed by three major thoroughfares: two federal highways (BR-101 and BR-304) and one state highway (RN-063, also known as the "Rota do Sol"). Parnamirim is home to the Augusto Severo International Airport, located adjacent to the Natal Air Force Base, which now operates exclusively for military aviation since it was decommissioned for civil aviation and commercial aviation on May 31, 2014, when it was replaced by the Governador Aluízio Alves International Airport in São Gonçalo do Amarante. For rail transport, the city is served by the South Line of the Natal Urban Train System, with four stations: Boa Esperança, Cajupiranga, Jardim Aeroporto, and Parnamirim.

=== Healthcare ===
The healthcare network in Parnamirim comprises 31 primary health care units (UBS), four psychosocial care centers (CAPS), and two general hospitals (as of August 2018), namely the Dr. Deoclécio Marques de Lucena Regional Hospital (state-managed) and the Divino Amor Maternity Hospital (municipal). The former is the larger of the two, offering 24-hour emergency services and providing care through the Unified Health System (SUS) in various specialties, including orthopedics, where it is a reference center. With 92 beds for hospitalization (as of July 2021), it was inaugurated on August 9, 2004, and is maintained by the Rio Grande do Norte State Health Department (SESAP-RN).

According to data from the Municipal Health Department, in 2008, Parnamirim had 345 health professionals residing in the municipality, including 174 community health agents, ten social workers, 101 nursing assistants, 32 dental assistants, 24 nurses, two general practitioners, and two nutritionists. Among health professionals residing outside the municipality, there were 405 individuals, including four community health workers, 43 nursing assistants, 25 biochemists, 52 dentists, 65 nurses, thirteen physiotherapists, thirty gynecologists, six cardiologists, five general practitioners, 46 pediatricians, six nutritionists, nineteen orthopedists, nine psychologists, eleven ophthalmologists, and nine radiologists, along with 36 others in various health professions.

=== Education ===
Parnamirim's network of educational institutions covers all levels, from basic education to secondary education, in both public and private sectors, with a total of 49,216 enrollments (2020 school census), the majority in elementary education. Among the higher education institutions are Maurício de Nassau College (UNINASSAU); the Metropolitan College of Science and Technology (FAMEC), formerly União Americana College; UNIRB Parnamirim College, previously the Parnamirim College of Management and Business; the Federal Institute of Rio Grande do Norte (IFRN); and the Potiguar University (UnP).

The education component of the Municipal Human Development Index (IDH-M) reached 0.726 in 2010, while the literacy rate for the population aged ten and older, as reported in the same year's census, was 92.4% (93.1% for women and 91.7% for men). Among neighborhoods, the highest literacy rates were in Cohabinal (97.3%) and Nova Parnamirim (96.3%), while the lowest were in Santa Tereza (85.4%) and Liberdade (85.1%). The expected number of years of schooling was 10.24 in 2010, surpassing the state average of 9.54 years.

Completion rates for elementary education (ages 15–17) and secondary education (ages 18–24) were 59.99% and 59.63%, respectively. School attendance rates were 95.74% for children aged 5–6 and 89.15% for those aged 11–13 in the final years of elementary education. Among youths, 62.24% of those aged 15–17 had completed elementary education, and 52.5% of those aged 18–20 had completed secondary education. Among the population aged 25 and older, 65.19% had completed elementary education, 52.59% had completed secondary education, 9.86% were illiterate, and 16.55% had completed higher education. More recent data from 2014 indicated a dropout rate of 3.9% in elementary education and 10.7% in secondary education.

== Culture ==
The Parnamirim Culture Foundation oversees the municipality's cultural sector, aiming to plan and implement cultural policies through programs, projects, and activities that promote cultural development. Affiliated with the Mayor’s Office, it operates as part of the municipality’s indirect public administration with administrative and financial autonomy, supported by budgetary allocations, its own assets, revenue application, and contracts or agreements with other institutions. Municipal holidays include May 13 and December 17, commemorating the patron saint Our Lady of Fátima and the city’s political emancipation, respectively.

=== Arts ===
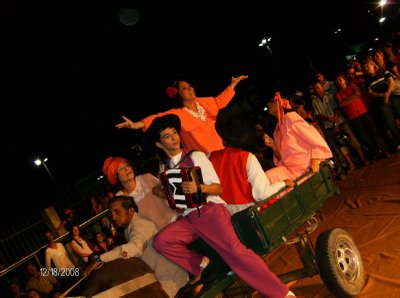
Performance of the show On the Wings of History in 2008

In Parnamirim’s theatrical scene, the Paulo Barbosa da Silva Municipal Cine-Theater stands out as one of the newest cultural venues in Rio Grande do Norte, inaugurated in September 2014 with a capacity for over 500 people. Municipal institutions also provide significant support. For instance, the Parnamirim Culture Foundation assists annually in May with celebrations for Our Lady of Fátima. In 2011, it organized the operetta Oratory of Our Lady of Fátima in honor of the city’s patron saint, alongside theatrical performances and religious shows.

Since 2006, the foundation has annually organized the show On the Wings of History, a theatrical production that recounts the city’s history for its residents. It is performed in various neighborhoods and districts in December, around the anniversary of political emancipation. The Conto e Encanto Reading Project, launched in 2009, features children’s theater performances for children aged 2–6 in Parnamirim’s daycare centers.

Handicrafts are another vibrant expression of Parnamirim's cultural identity, with artisans creating distinctive works using regional raw materials and reflecting local culture and lifestyles. Various groups, including the Municipal Social Assistance Department (Semas), bring together artisans, providing spaces for crafting, exhibiting, and selling their products. These items are typically sold at fairs, exhibitions, or shops, such as the Paz de Deus Square Craft Fair, held annually in May.

=== Attractions ===
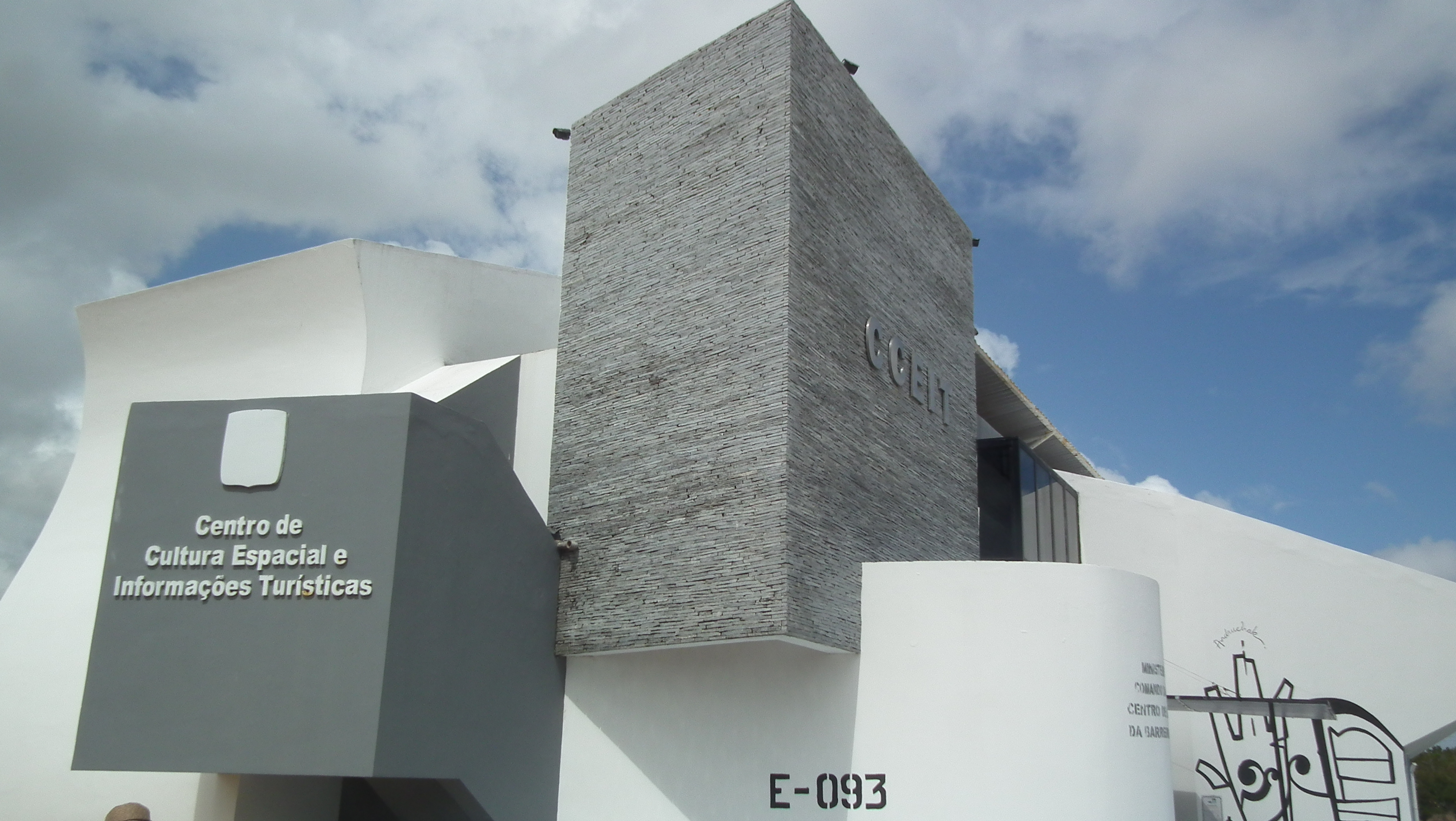
Space Culture and Tourist Information Center (CCEIT)

The Barreira do Inferno Launch Center (CLBI), located along the RN-063, is a Brazilian Air Force (FAB) base for rocket launches, featuring a beach and an aerospace museum. Across the highway, the Space Culture and Tourist Information Center (CCEIT), inaugurated in 2011, houses an extensive collection detailing the history of CLBI and replicas of rockets launched at the base.

The Aluízio Alves Park, opened on March 18, 2007, is part of a complex that includes a luminous fountain, restrooms, a skate park, playground, and an arena theater, as well as a small artificial river, a replica of the Pico do Cabugi, and a life-sized statue of the former Potiguar governor. It also features a planetarium named after him. Another attraction is the Municipal Public Market, a key hub for popular commerce in the city.

The beaches of Cotovelo and Pirangi do Norte are among the main natural attractions. Cotovelo is known for its cliffs and significant scenic value. Pirangi do Norte is notable for the Pirangi Reefs and is home to the Cashew of Pirangi, which spans 10,000 square meters and was recognized by the Guinness Book of World Records as the largest cashew tree in the world in 1994.

Among cultural attractions, the Rio Grande do Norte Livestock and Agricultural Machinery Exhibition, commonly known as "Festa do Boi," stands out. Held since 1955, when Parnamirim was still a district of Natal, it is the state’s largest agribusiness event. It features livestock exhibitions, contests, auctions, and extensive business activities, alongside a vibrant cultural program with performances by various artists.

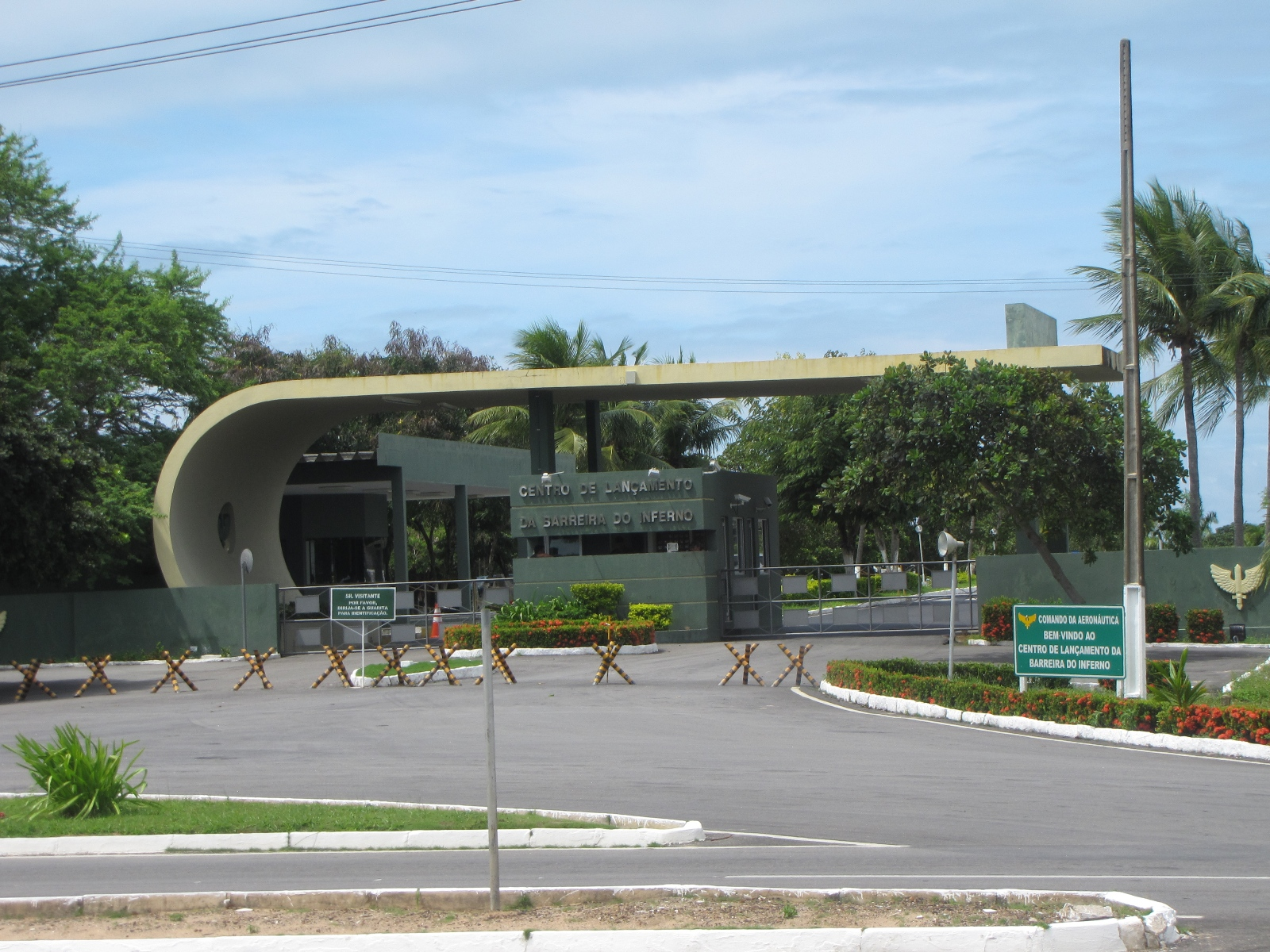
Entrance to the Barreira do Inferno Launch Center

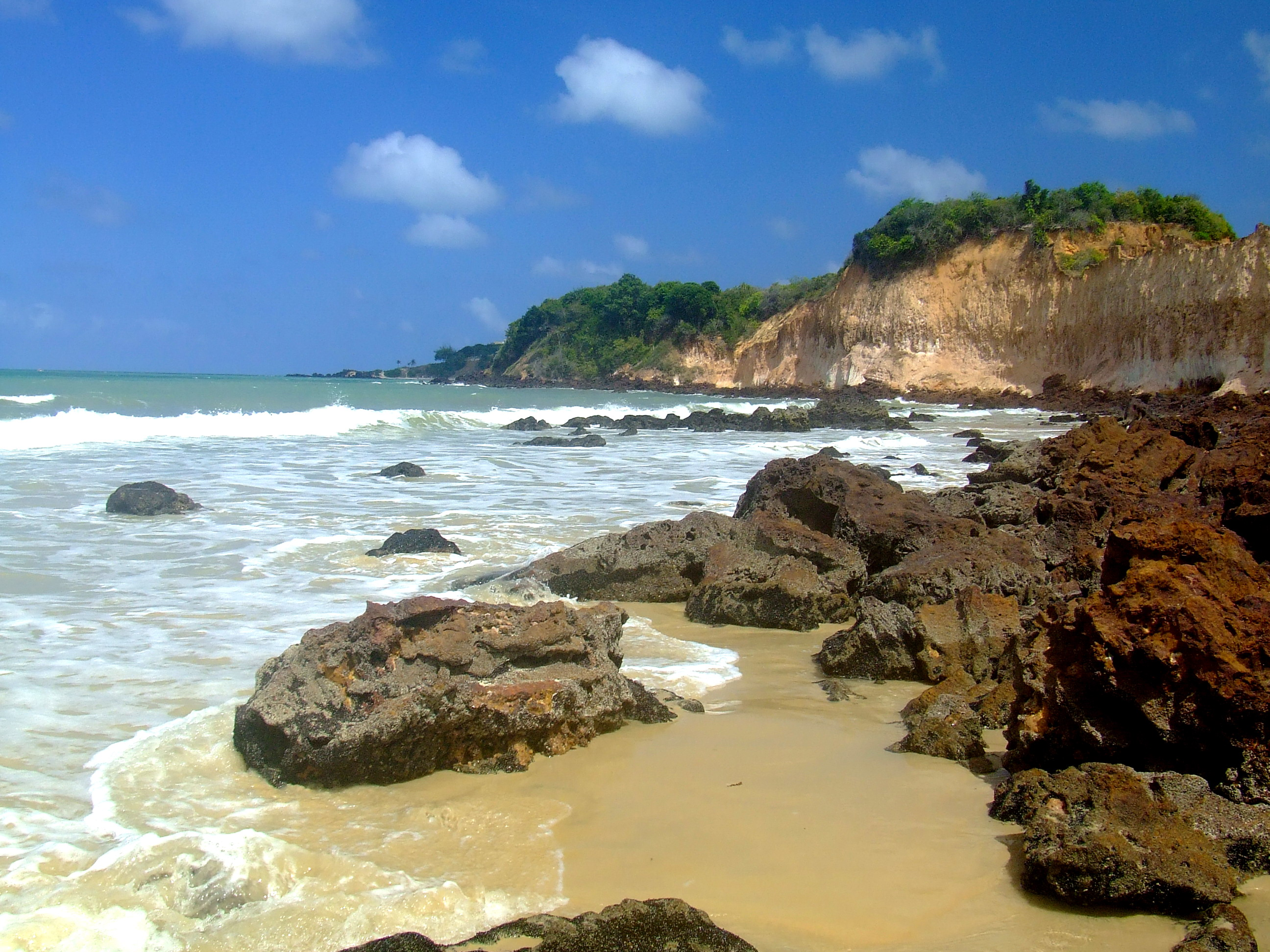
Cotovelo Beach and its cliffs

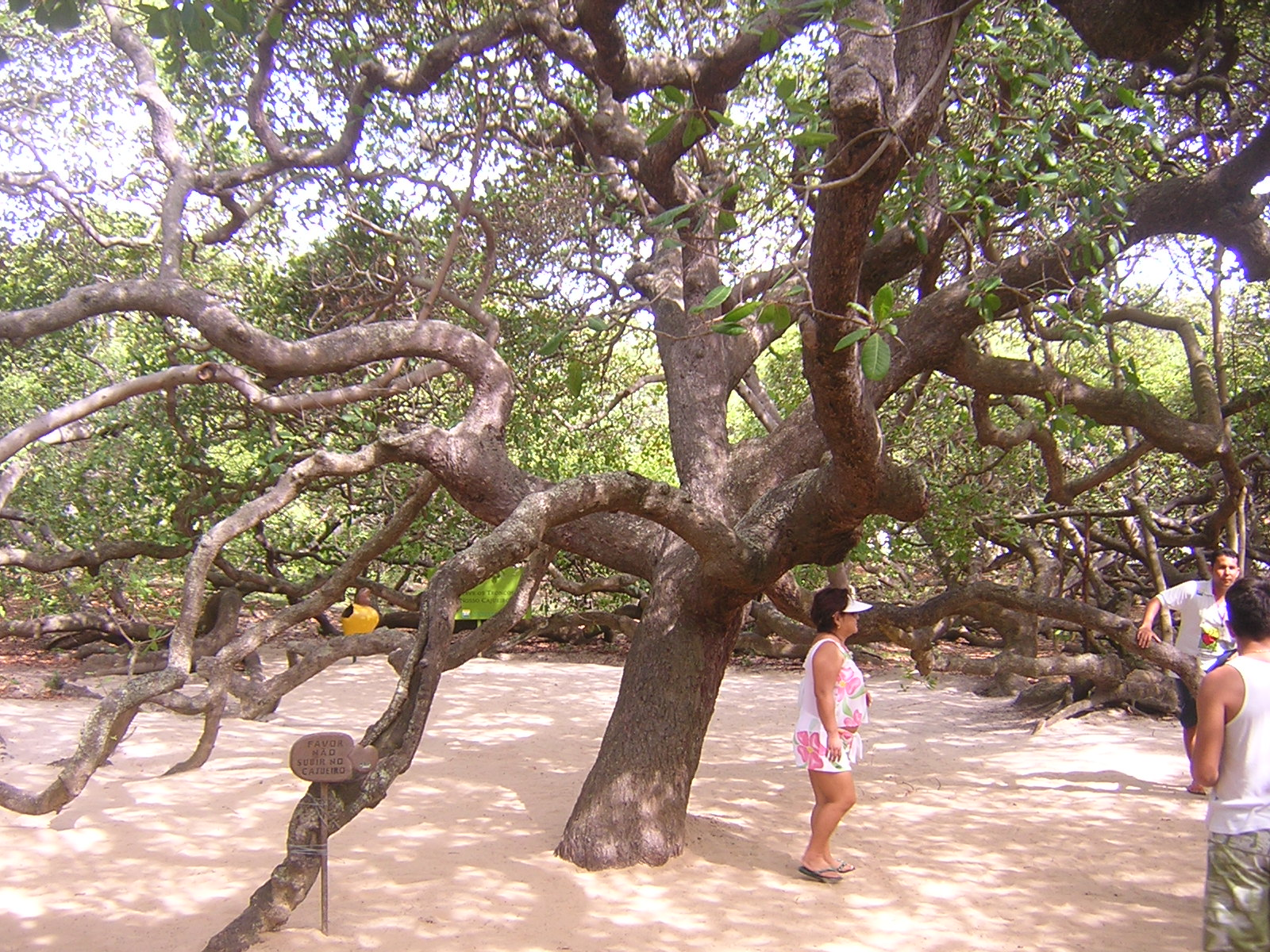
The Cashew of Pirangi in the Pirangi do Norte district

== Sports ==
As in much of the country, the most popular sport in Parnamirim is soccer. A prominent club in the city is Potiguar de Parnamirim, founded on February 11, 1945. The team plays its home matches at Estádio Tenente Luiz Gonzaga, commonly known as Gonzagão, which remains the city's main stadium. Another notable team is the Parnamirim Sport Club, which was founded on July 14, 1985. There is also the Parnamirim Futebol Clube.

The Municipal Secretariat of Tourism, Sports, and Leisure (SETEL) is the public body responsible for planning and overseeing sports activities, as well as the leisure and tourism sectors, in the municipality of Parnamirim. In addition to the football clubs mentioned, the city also hosts teams in various other sports, including futsal, athletics, volleyball, beach soccer, dodgeball, cycling, handball, and BMX. Among the notable competitions, the Parnamirim School Games, held annually since 2004, stand out as a major event, bringing together over a thousand students from public and private schools to compete in a variety of sports.

== See also ==
- For All - O Trampolim da Vitória
- List of cities in Brazil by population

== Bibliography ==
- Duarte, Cynthia Romariz; Petta, Reinaldo Antonio; Medeiros, Cleyber Nascimento de; Araújo, Ludmagna Pereira (2004). "Mapeamento do uso e ocupação do solo da bacia do rio Pitimbu/RN" [Mapping of land use and occupation in the Pitimbu River basin/RN]. Anais do II Simpósio Regional de Geoprocessamento e Sensoriamento Remoto (in Portuguese). Aracaju, SE: EMBRAPA.
- Farias, Flávio Henrique Cunha de (2009). Caracterização biológica e zoneamento ambiental do Parque Estadual do Jiquí - RN/Brasil: subsídios ao plano de manejo [Biological characterization and environmental zoning of Jiquí State Park - RN/Brazil: contributions to the management plan]. Curso de Mestrado em Biologia da Conservação, Departamento de Biologia Animal (Dissertação (Mestrado)) (in Portuguese). Lisbon, Portugal: University of Lisbon. p. 56.
- Giesta, Josyanne Pinto (2016). Expansão urbana de Parnamirim: os desafios do planejamento urbano [Urban expansion of Parnamirim: the challenges of urban planning] (in Portuguese). Natal: IFRN Editora. p. 195.
- Medeiros, Cleyber Nascimento de; Petta, Reinaldo Antonio; Duarte, Cynthia Romariz (2007). "Estudo do meio físico para avaliação da vulnerabilidade à ocupação humana do Município de Parnamirim (RN), utilizando técnicas de geoprocessamento" [Study of the physical environment to assess vulnerability to human occupation in the Municipality of Parnamirim (RN), using geoprocessing techniques]. Geociências (in Portuguese). 24 (3). São Paulo: 239–253.
- Peixoto, Carlos (2003). A história de Parnamirim [The history of Parnamirim] (in Portuguese). Natal: Z Comunicação. p. 222.
