= World's largest cashew tree =

"World's largest cashew tree" (Portuguese: o maior cajueiro do mundo) may refer to one of two trees in Brazil:

- Cashew of Pirangi (O Cajueiro de Pirangi), said to cover between 7,300 and 8,400 square metres
- Cashew of A Praia (O Cajueiro da Praia), said to cover 8,800 square meters
