= BR-304 (Brazil highway) =

Highway in Brazil

BR-304
- Rodovia do Futuro
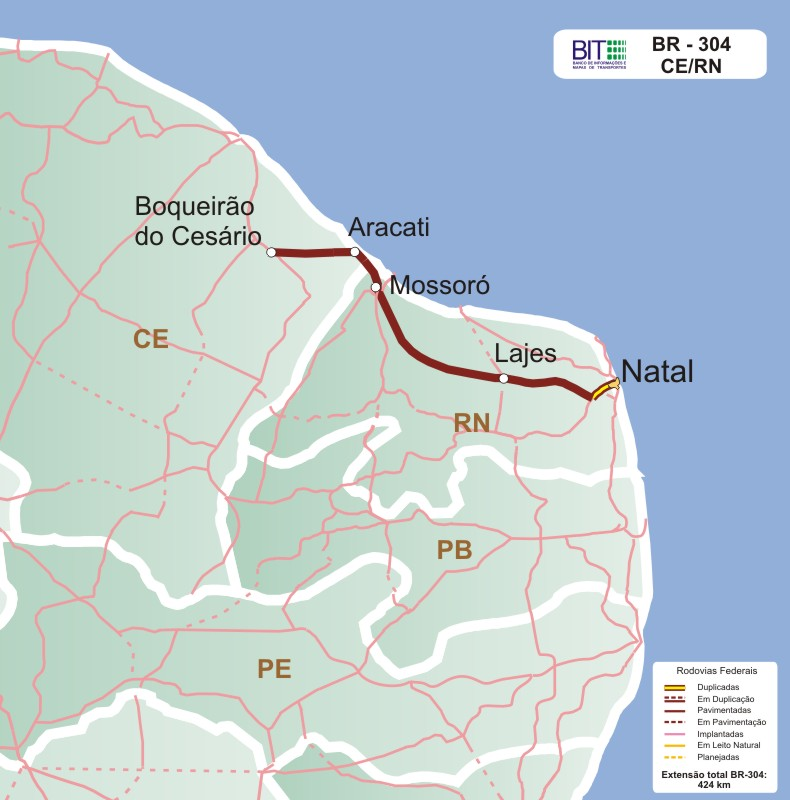

Route information
- Length: 422.3 km (262.4 mi)

Major junctions
- From: Beberibe, Ceará
- To: Natal, Rio Grande do Norte

Location
- Country: Brazil

Highway system
- Highways in Brazil; Federal

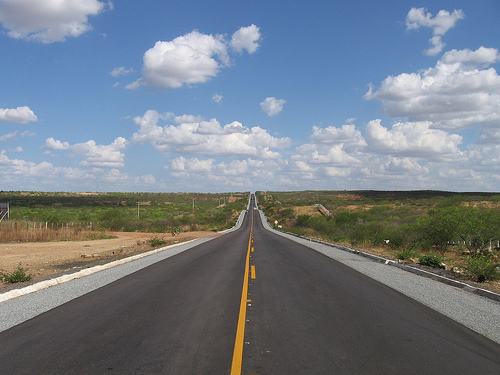
Rodovia BR-304

BR-304 is a Brazilian federal highway that begins in Beberibe, Ceará and ends in Natal, Rio Grande do Norte. The highway also serves the municipalities of Aracati in Ceará and Mossoró, Lajes and Parnamirim in Rio Grande do Norte.
