= Nísia Floresta, Rio Grande do Norte =

Municipality in Rio Grande do Norte, Brazil

Coordinates: 6°04′S 35°08′W

- Municipality
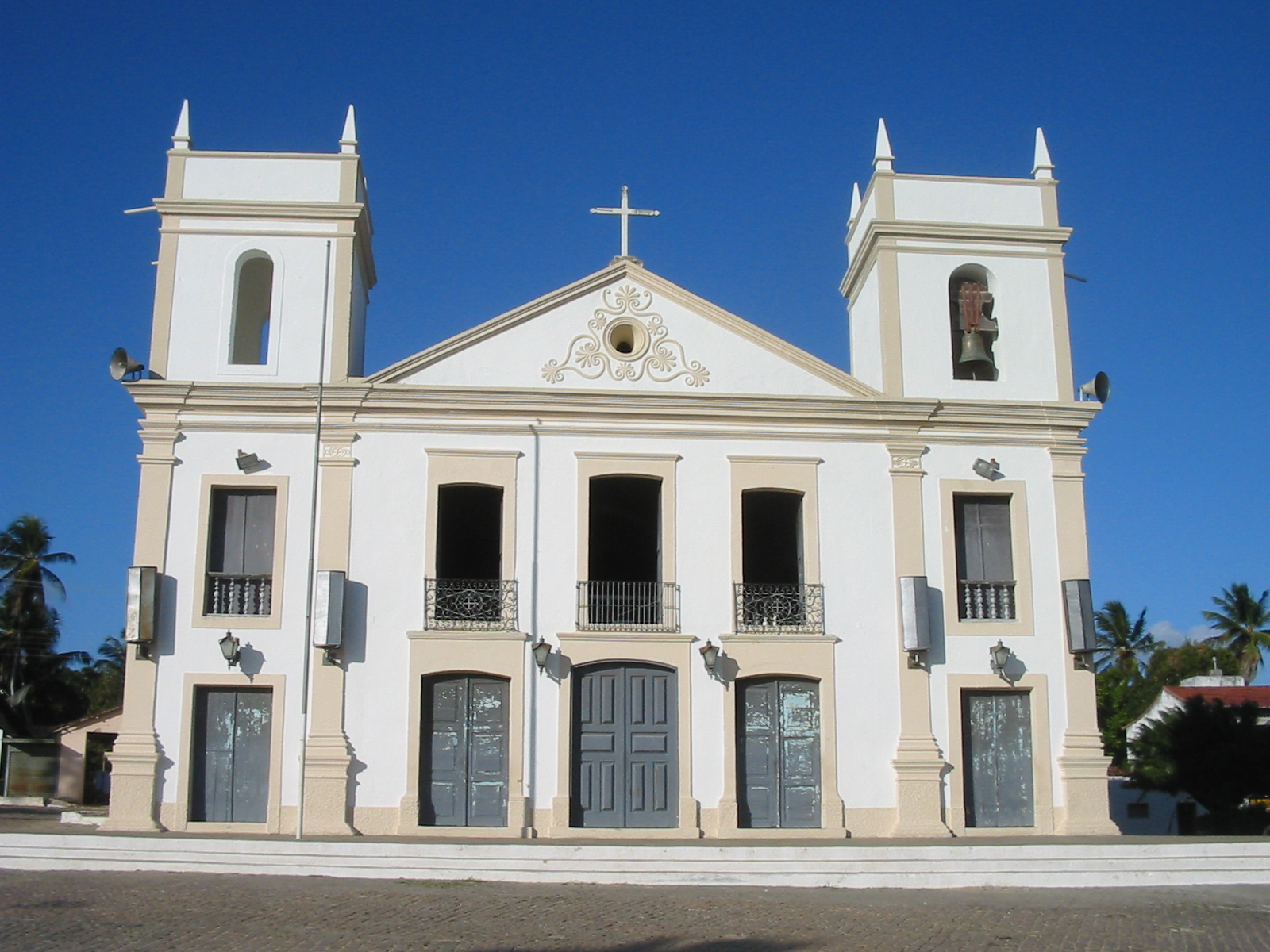
- Nísia Floresta cathedral.

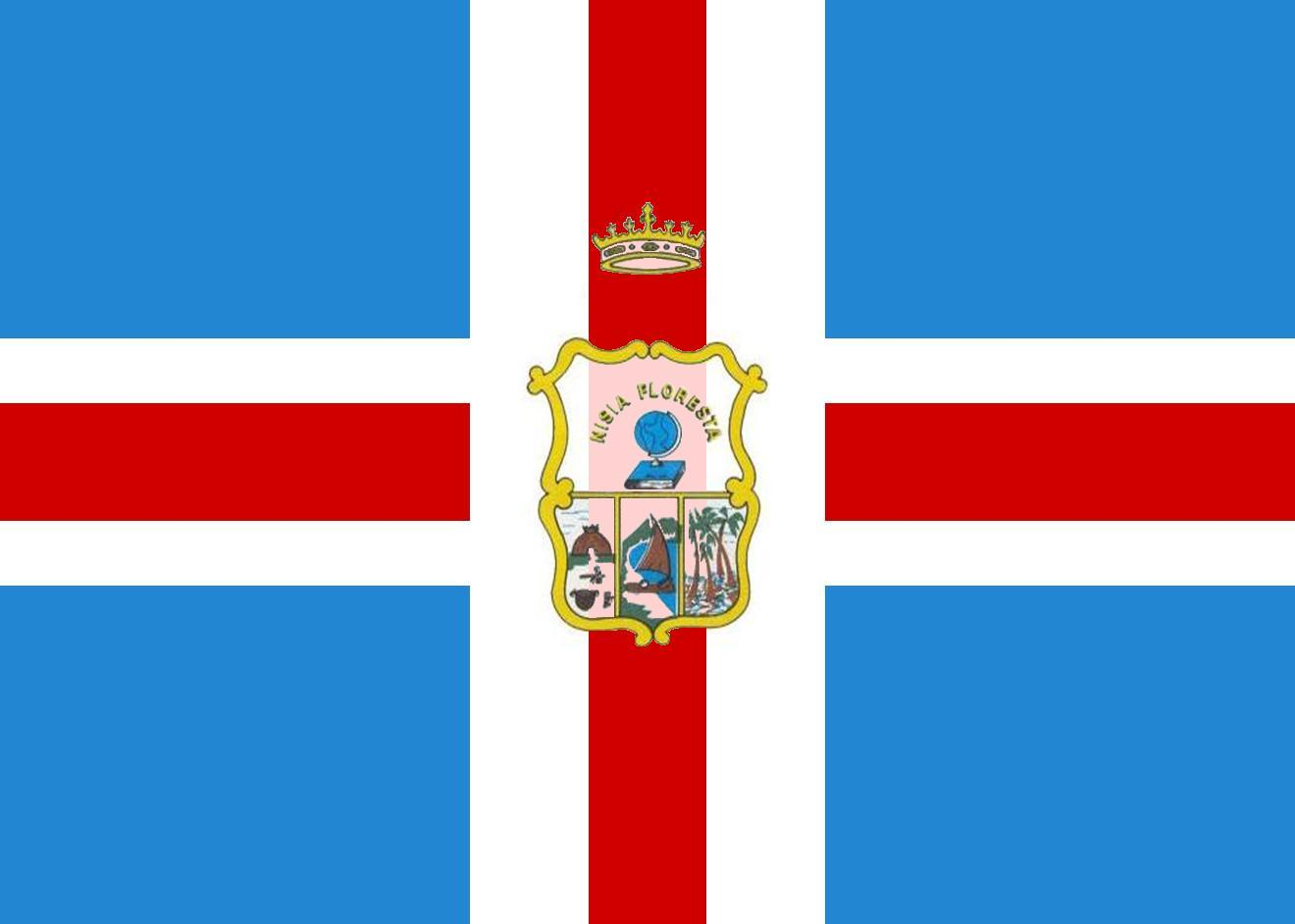
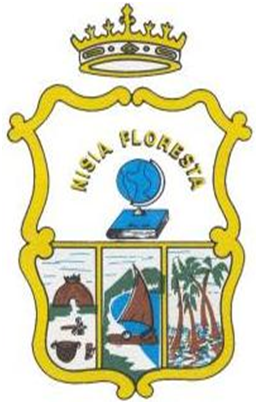
- Flag Coat of arms

- Location in Brazil
- Country: Brazil
- Region: Nordeste
- State: Rio Grande do Norte
- Mesoregion: Leste Potiguar

Population (2020)
  - Total: 27,938
- Time zone: UTC−3 (BRT)

Nísia Floresta is a municipality in the state of Rio Grande do Norte in the Northeast region of Brazil.

The municipality contains the Nísia Floresta National Forest, a 169 hectares (420 acres) sustainable use conservation unit created in 2001.

== See also ==
- List of municipalities in Rio Grande do Norte
