= Sistema de Trens Urbanos de Natal =

Brazilian railway

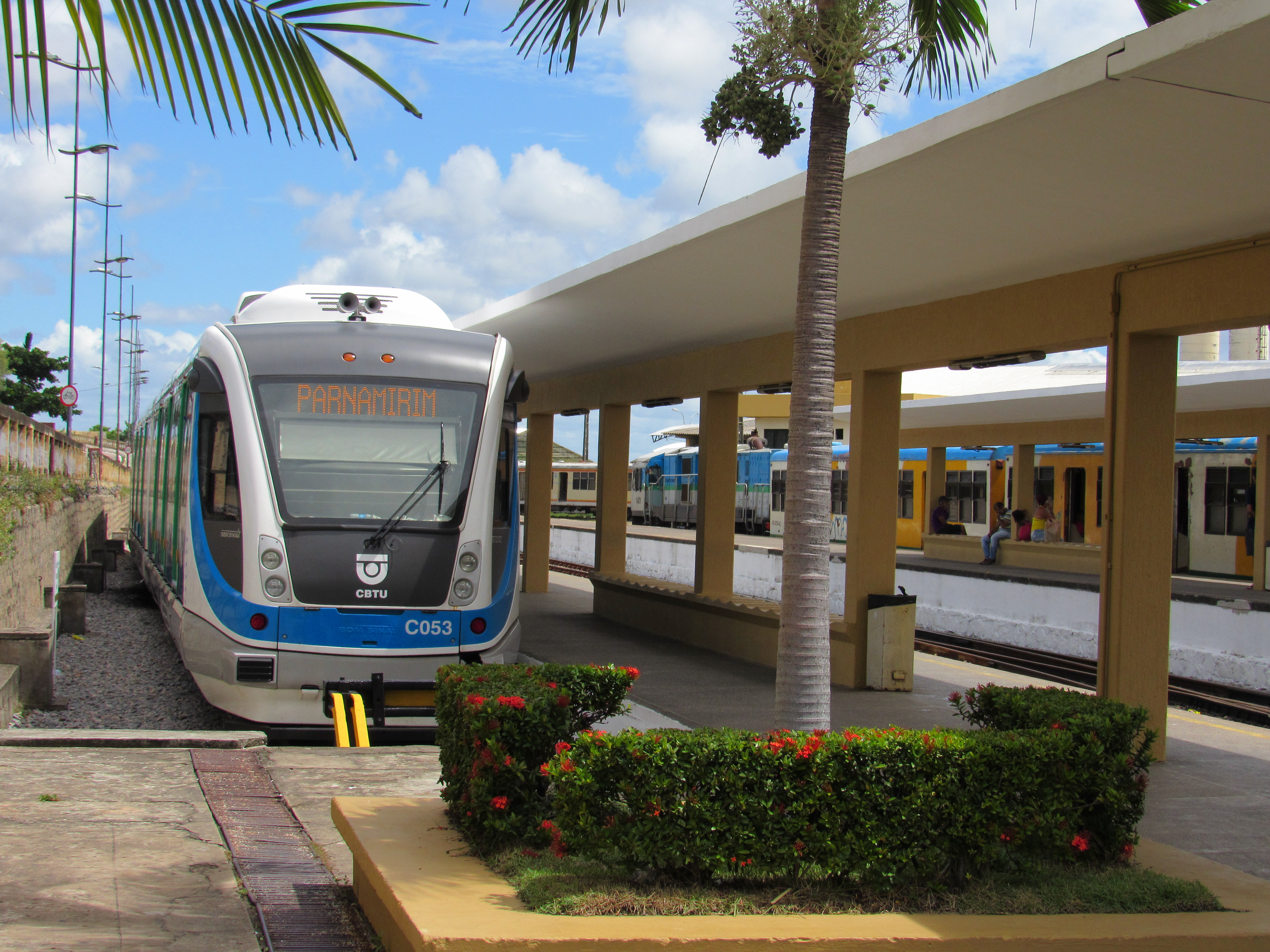

Overview
- Owner: CBTU
- Locale: Natal, Rio Grande do Norte, Brazil
- Transit type: Commuter rail
- Number of lines: 2
- Number of stations: 24
- Daily ridership: 15,000
- Annual ridership: 3.7 million

Technical
- System length: 56.2 km (34.9 mi)
- Track gauge: 1,000 mm (3 ft 3 3/8 in) metre gauge

The Sistema de Trens Urbanos de Natal (Natal Urban Trains System) is the metropolitan train system of the Natal Metropolitan Region in Brazil. It is operated by the Companhia Brasileira de Trens Urbanos (CBTU).

It consists of 22 stations on a two-line system of 56 kilometres. It was extended to 24 stations and 71 km on 17 January 2023. Rodoviaria of Natal is not directly linked, but walkable, closest stations Bom Pastor and Cidade Esperança.
