= Cajueiro da Praia =

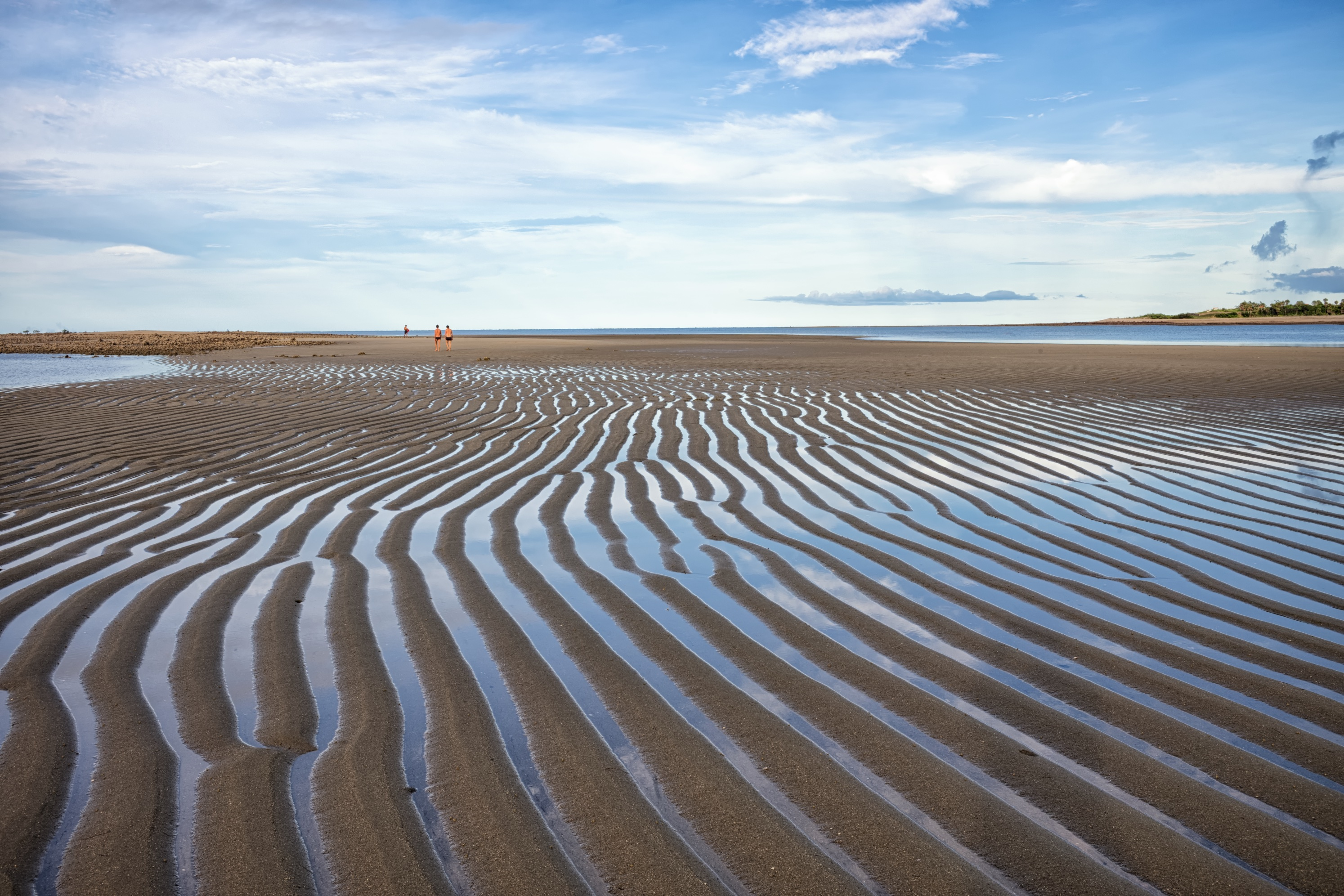

- Location in Piauí and Brazil
- Coordinates: 02°55′40″S 41°20′09″W
- Country: Brazil
- Region: Northeast
- State: Piauí

Government
  - Mayor: Girvaldo Albuquerque da Silva

Area
  - Total: 271.348 km^{2} (104.768 sq mi)

Population (2020)
  - Total: 7,674
  - Density: 22.7/km^{2} (59/sq mi)
- Time zone: UTC−3 (BRT)

Cajueiro da Praia is one of the four coastal cities of Piauí, Brazil.

The municipality contains part of the 313,800-hectare (775,000-acre) Delta do Parnaíba Environmental Protection Area, created in 1996.

The city is home to the Cashew of A Praia (Cajueiro da Praia), which is either the largest cashew tree in the world, at 8,800 square metres (2.2 acres), or the second largest, after the Cashew of Pirangi. The tree has been studied by the State University of Piauí.
