= Macaíba =

Municipality in Rio Grande do Norte, Brazil

Coordinates: 5.85778°S 35.3539°W

- Municipality
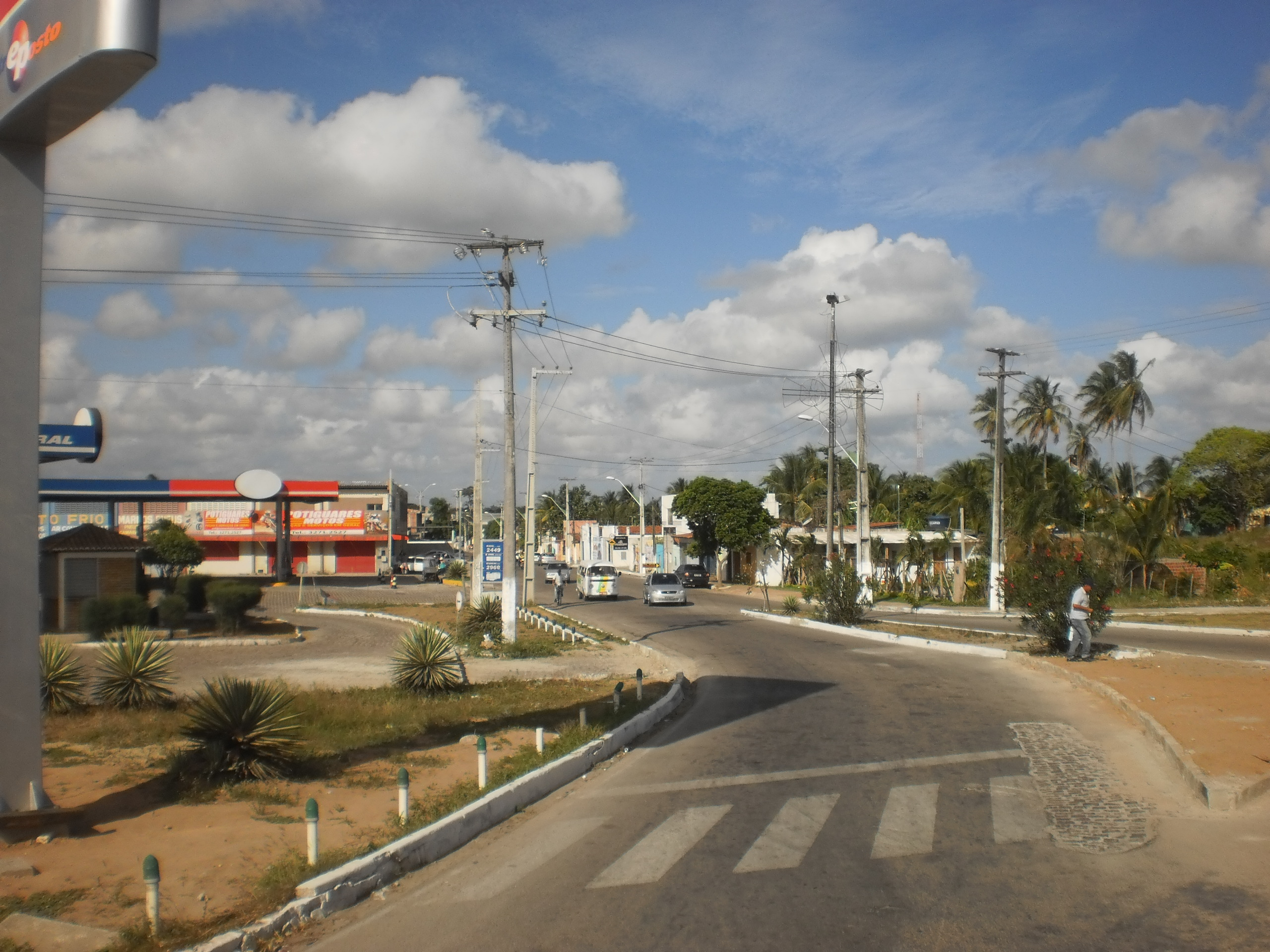

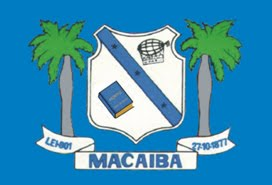
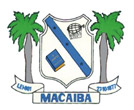
- Flag Coat of arms
- Interactive map of Macaíba
- Country: Brazil
- Region: Nordeste
- State: Rio Grande do Norte
- Mesoregion: Leste Potiguar

Population (2020)
  - Total: 81,821
- Time zone: UTC−3 (BRT)

Macaíba is a municipality in the state of Rio Grande do Norte in the Northeast region of Brazil.

== Climate ==
Macaíba has a rather dry tropical savanna climate (Köppen As) with like most of the Nordeste coast a strong dry season from September to January. Although the area is substantially drier than Natal, in accordance with its location in the transition to the agreste further west, the climate is hot year round and humidity is generally high particularly in the rainy season.

Climate data for Macaíba
Month	Jan	Feb	Mar	Apr	May	Jun	Jul	Aug	Sep	Oct	Nov	Dec	Year
Record high °C (°F)	35.3 (95.5)	34.9 (94.8)	35.5 (95.9)	35.0 (95.0)	33.7 (92.7)	32.9 (91.2)	33.0 (91.4)	33.7 (92.7)	34.3 (93.7)	33.8 (92.8)	34.3 (93.7)	34.2 (93.6)	35.5 (95.9)
Mean daily maximum °C (°F)	31.6 (88.9)	31.7 (89.1)	31.4 (88.5)	31.0 (87.8)	30.5 (86.9)	29.7 (85.5)	29.2 (84.6)	29.6 (85.3)	30.2 (86.4)	30.8 (87.4)	31.0 (87.8)	31.2 (88.2)	30.7 (87.3)
Daily mean °C (°F)	26.7 (80.1)	26.9 (80.4)	26.7 (80.1)	26.1 (79.0)	25.4 (77.7)	24.3 (75.7)	23.7 (74.7)	23.9 (75.0)	24.6 (76.3)	25.3 (77.5)	26.0 (78.8)	26.4 (79.5)	25.5 (77.9)
Mean daily minimum °C (°F)	22.4 (72.3)	22.5 (72.5)	22.5 (72.5)	22.2 (72.0)	21.7 (71.1)	21.1 (70.0)	20.4 (68.7)	20.2 (68.4)	20.7 (69.3)	21.3 (70.3)	21.5 (70.7)	21.9 (71.4)	21.5 (70.7)
Record low °C (°F)	15.8 (60.4)	17.8 (64.0)	18.6 (65.5)	17.0 (62.6)	17.0 (62.6)	18.6 (65.5)	15.7 (60.3)	15.0 (59.0)	14.6 (58.3)	15.4 (59.7)	15.8 (60.4)	14.9 (58.8)	14.6 (58.3)
Average rainfall mm (inches)	48.7 (1.92)	88.2 (3.47)	150.5 (5.93)	176.4 (6.94)	160.7 (6.33)	158.0 (6.22)	117.3 (4.62)	67.3 (2.65)	28.1 (1.11)	12.7 (0.50)	16.0 (0.63)	24.1 (0.95)	1,048 (41.27)
Average relative humidity (%)	69.2	70.2	74.0	78.0	79.0	81.4	79.6	76.3	72.2	67.8	67.3	68.4	73.6
Source 1: Universidade Federal de Campina Grande
Source 2: INMET

== See also ==
- List of municipalities in Rio Grande do Norte
