= Rio Grande do Norte =

State of Brazil

- State
- Flag Coat of arms

- Location in Brazil
- Coordinates: 5.74°S 36.55°W
- Country: Brazil
- Region: Northeast
- Capital and largest city: Natal

Government
  - Type: Unitary state
  - Governor: Fátima Bezerra (PT)
  - Vice Governor: Walter Alves (MDB)
  - Senators: Rogério Marinho (PL); Styvenson Valentim (Podemos); Zenaide Maia (PSD)
  - Legislature: Legislative Assembly of Rio Grande do Norte

Area
  - Total: 52,796.791 km^{2} (20,384.955 sq mi)
  - Rank: 22nd

Population (2022)
  - Total: 3,302,729
  - Rank: 16th
  - Density: 62.55549/km^{2} (162.0180/sq mi)
  - Rank: 10th
- Demonym: Potiguar or Norte-rio-grandense

GDP (2024)
  - Total: R$111.453 billion (US$20.682 billion)

HDI
  - Year: 2024
  - Category: 0.778 – high (15th)
- Time zone: UTC-3 (BRT)
- Postal Code: 59000-000 to 59990-000
- ISO 3166 code: BR-RN
- Website: www.rn.gov.br

Rio Grande do Norte (UK: /ˌriːuː ˌɡrændi duː ˈnɔːrti/, US: /- ˌɡrɑːn-/, Brazilian Portuguese: [ˈʁi.u ˈɡɾɐ̃dʒ(i) du ˈnɔʁtʃi]) is one of the states of Brazil. It is located in the northeastern region of the country, forming the northeasternmost tip of the South American continent. The name literally translates to "Great Northern River", referring to the mouth of the Potenji River.

The state is divided into 167 municipalities and the capital and largest city is Natal. The state has 410 km (254 mi) of sandy beaches and contains Rocas Atoll, the only atoll in the South Atlantic Ocean. The main economic activity is tourism, followed by the extraction of petroleum (the second largest producer in the country), agriculture, fruit growing and extraction of minerals, including considerable production of seasalt, among other economic activities. The state is home to 1.7% of the Brazilian population and produces 1% of the country's GDP. In 2017, the murder rate rose by 655%, making Rio Grande do Norte the state with the highest murder rate in Brazil: 63.9 per 100,000. But since then, it has experienced a gradual decline, dropping 6 percentage points in 2023 to 21.65.

Tourist attractions in the state include the Cashew of Pirangi (the world's largest cashew tree), the dunes and the dromedaries of Genipabu, the beaches of Ponta Negra, Maracajaú and Pipa, the Carnatal, Natal's carnival, the sixteenth-century Forte dos Reis Magos fortification, the hills and mountains of Martins, the Natal Dunes State Park, and others. The folklorist Luís da Câmara Cascudo was born and worked in the state. The state is the closest part of mainland Brazil to the archipelago of Fernando de Noronha.

== Geography ==
Rio Grande do Norte is dominated by its coastline. The state is famed for its beaches and sand dunes, and the air is, according to NASA, the second-cleanest in the world after Antarctica.

Two climates predominate: humid tropical, in the oriental littoral, and semi-arid, in the remaining (most part) of the State (including the North coast). The rainforest which once covered most of Brazil's coast had its northern end in the south of Rio Grande do Norte; the area north of Natal, the capital, is under dunes, a kind of formation associated with semi-arid climate. The semi-arid climate is characterized not only by the low level but also the irregularity of rainfall; some years can go by with no or very little rain; most of the interior of the State is part of the Polygon of Droughts (an area which receives special attention from the federal government). There are also many mangroves in the state, and the interior is dominated by rainforest. Rocas Atoll in the Atlantic Ocean, 260 km Northeast of Natal, also belongs to the state of Rio Grande do Norte. It is contained in the fully protected Atol das Rocas Biological Reserve.

== History ==
The first European to reach the region may have been the Spaniard Alonso de Ojeda in 1499. The northeastern tip of South America, Cape São Roque, 20 miles (32 km) to the north of Natal, was first officially visited by European navigators in 1501, in the 1501–1502 Portuguese expedition led by Amerigo Vespucci, who named the spot after the saint of the day. The Vespucci expedition also named the Potengi (Tupi for "River of Shrimps") river, whose considerably large mouth contrasted with the nearby bodies of water, "Rio Grande" (Portuguese for "Great River"), after which the Captaincy, Province, and State were named. For decades thereafter, no permanent European settlement was established in the area, inhabited by the Potiguara people.

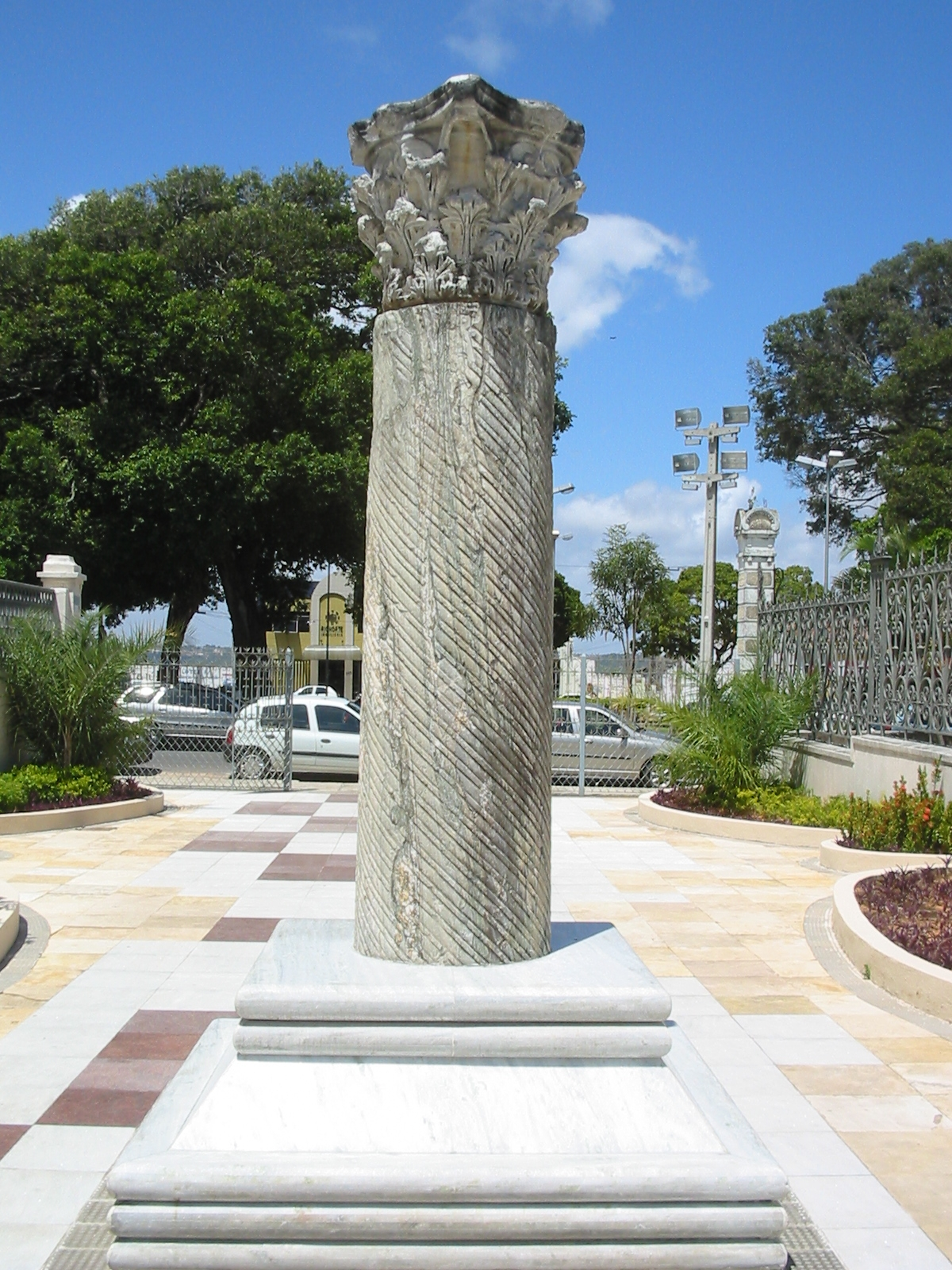
Column Capitolina was donated to the state by Mussolini.

In the 16th century (between 1535 and 1598), it was explored by French pirates in search for brazilwood. In 1598, the Portuguese built the Forte dos Reis Magos and, in the following year, founded the city of Natal. Raising cattle and sugarcane plantation lifted the local development and economy.

In 1633, the area became a battleground between the expansionist Portuguese, seeking to take more land for their Brazilian territories, and the Dutch, who gained a foothold in South America.

After a short period of peace and prosperity in Olinda and Recife, the sugar prices went down in the market of Amsterdam and the region entered into a serious economic crisis. The economic problems led the Portuguese settlers and native Brazilians to revolt against the Dutch in what is known today as the massacres of Cunhaú and Uruaçu.

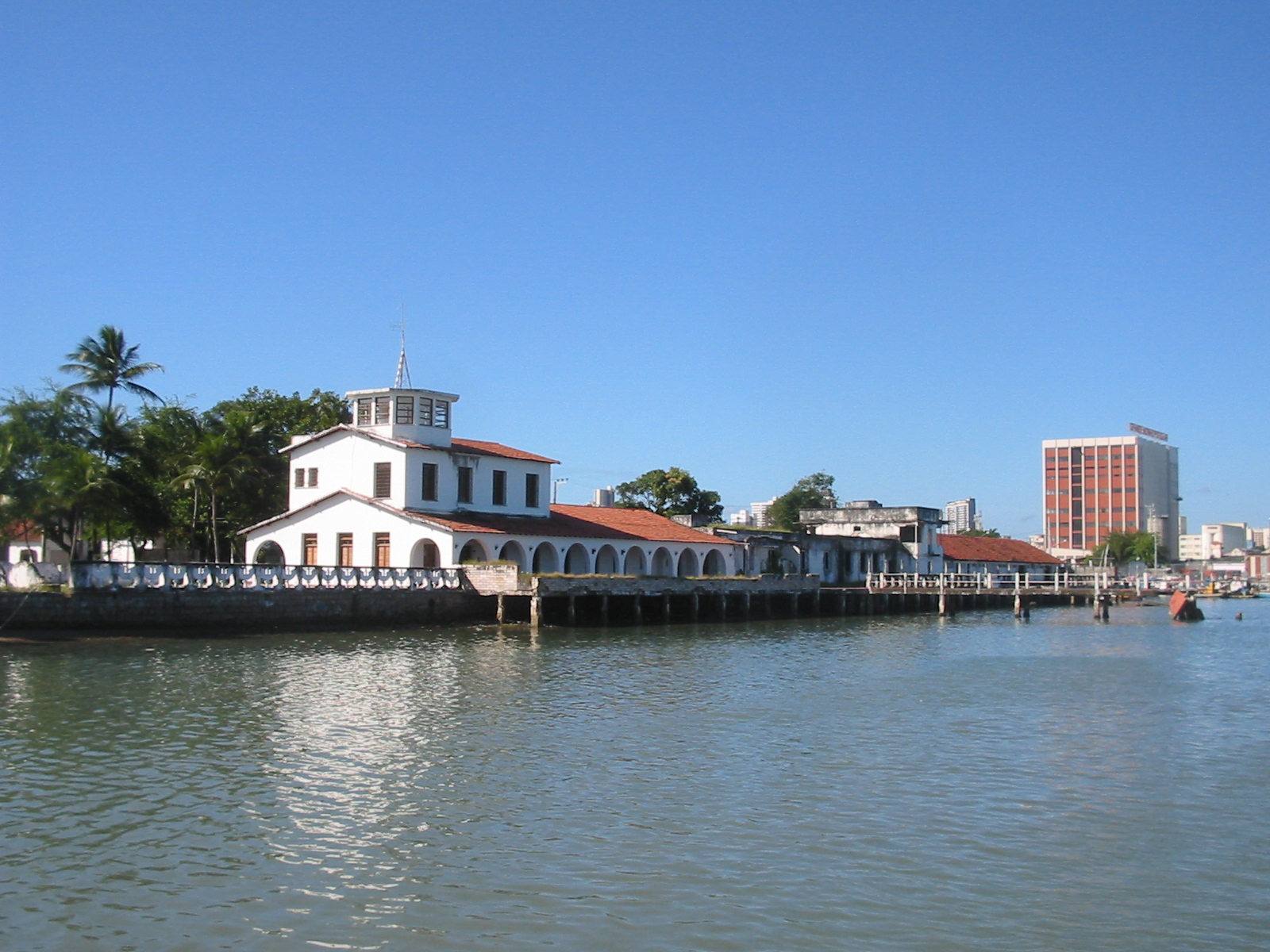
Rampa, one of the American air bases used during World War II.

The religious confrontations (the Portuguese-Brazilian Catholicism and the Dutch Calvinism), Portugal's restoration of the throne in 1640 and the reconquest of Maranhão in 1643, lead the Portuguese-Brazilians to undertake the 1645 uprising, led by André Vidal de Negreiros and João Fernandes Vieira. The governor of Bahia promised new Portuguese troops, but most of the rebels were Africans and Amerindians. In 1654, the Dutch were finally cast out.

During World War II, Rio Grande do Norte was used as an Allied airbase from which to launch air raids on German-occupied North Africa.

In 1964, Latin America's first space launch site was constructed in Rio Grande do Norte; Barreira do Inferno (Hell's Barrier), which was often referred to as the "Brazilian NASA".

== Demographics ==
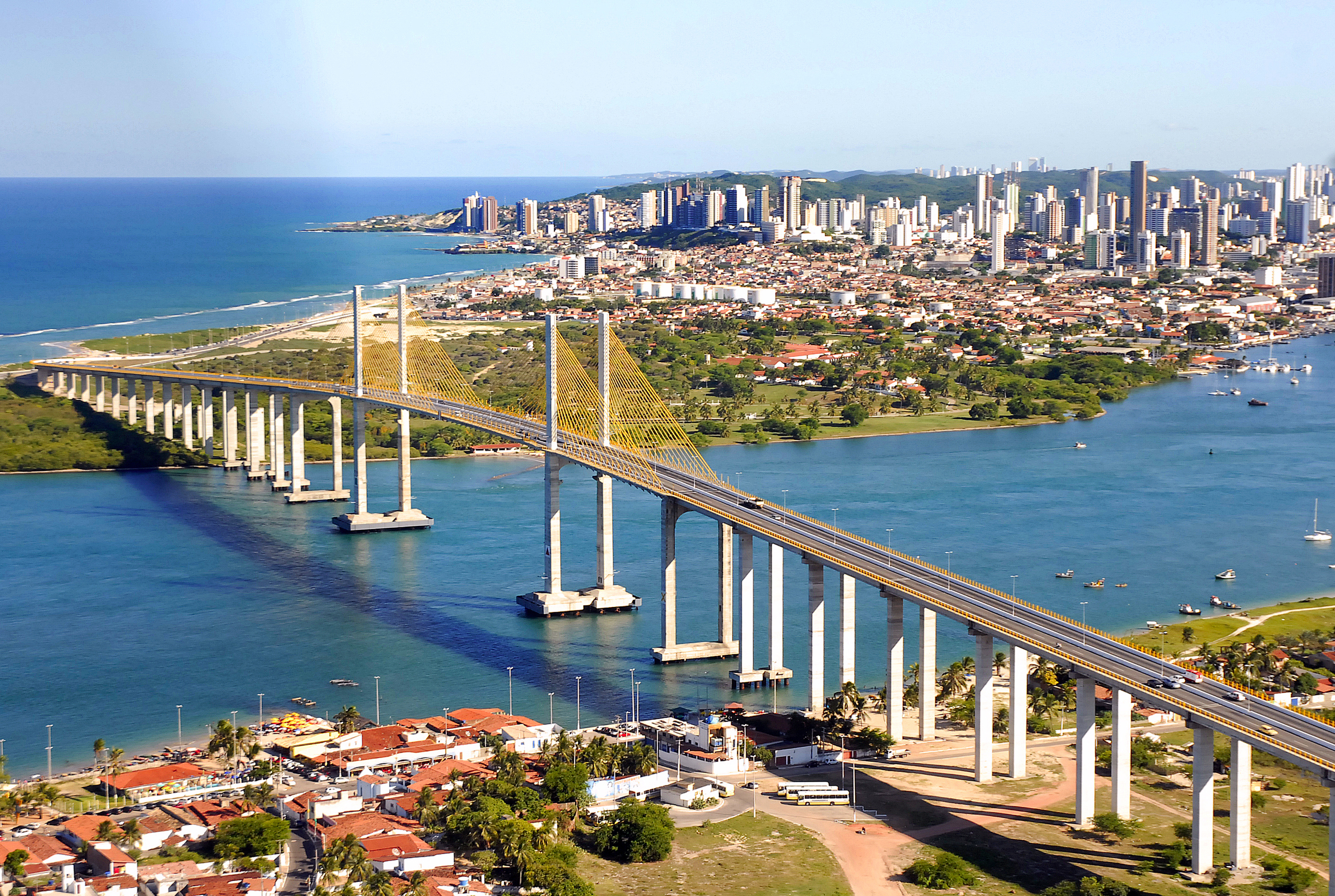
Natal, the capital of the state.

The Brazilian Institute of Geography and Statistics estimates that the population of Rio Grande do Norte was 3,568,765 on 1 December 2021, a 14.76% increase since the 2000 census. As of the 2022 census, multiracial people make up 50.9% of the total population. The second largest group composed by white people was 39.5% of the total population, followed by black people (9.2%), indigenous people 0.3% and Asian people (0.2%).

77,916 Migrants arrived in the state between 2000 and 2010, while 71,287 people left the state between 2000 and 2010.

=== Largest cities ===
Largest cities or towns in Rio Grande do Norte (2021 census by the Brazilian Institute of Geography and Statistics)
Rank		Pop.	Rank		Pop.
1	Natal	897,780	11	Santa Cruz	36,143
2	Mossoró	263,344	12	Nova Cruz	35,617
3	Parnamirim	208,425	13	Apodi	34,808
4	São Gonçalo do Amarante	89,044	14	João Câmara	32,456
5	Macaíba	70,586	15	Touros	31,335
6	Ceará-Mirim	68,580	16	Canguaretama	31,216
7	Caicó	63,147	17	Macau	29,204
8	Açu	53,636	18	Pau dos Ferros	27,974
9	Currais Novos	42,795	19	Areia Branca	25,529
10	São José de Mipibu	40,149	20	Extremoz	24,953

Historical population
Year	Pop.	±%
1872	233,979	—
1890	268,273	+14.7%
1900	274,317	+2.3%
1920	537,135	+95.8%
1940	768,018	+43.0%
1950	967,921	+26.0%
1960	1,157,258	+19.6%
1970	1,611,606	+39.3%
1980	1,933,126	+20.0%
1991	2,414,121	+24.9%
2000	2,777,509	+15.1%
2010	3,168,027	+14.1%
2022	3,302,729	+4.3%

=== Education ===
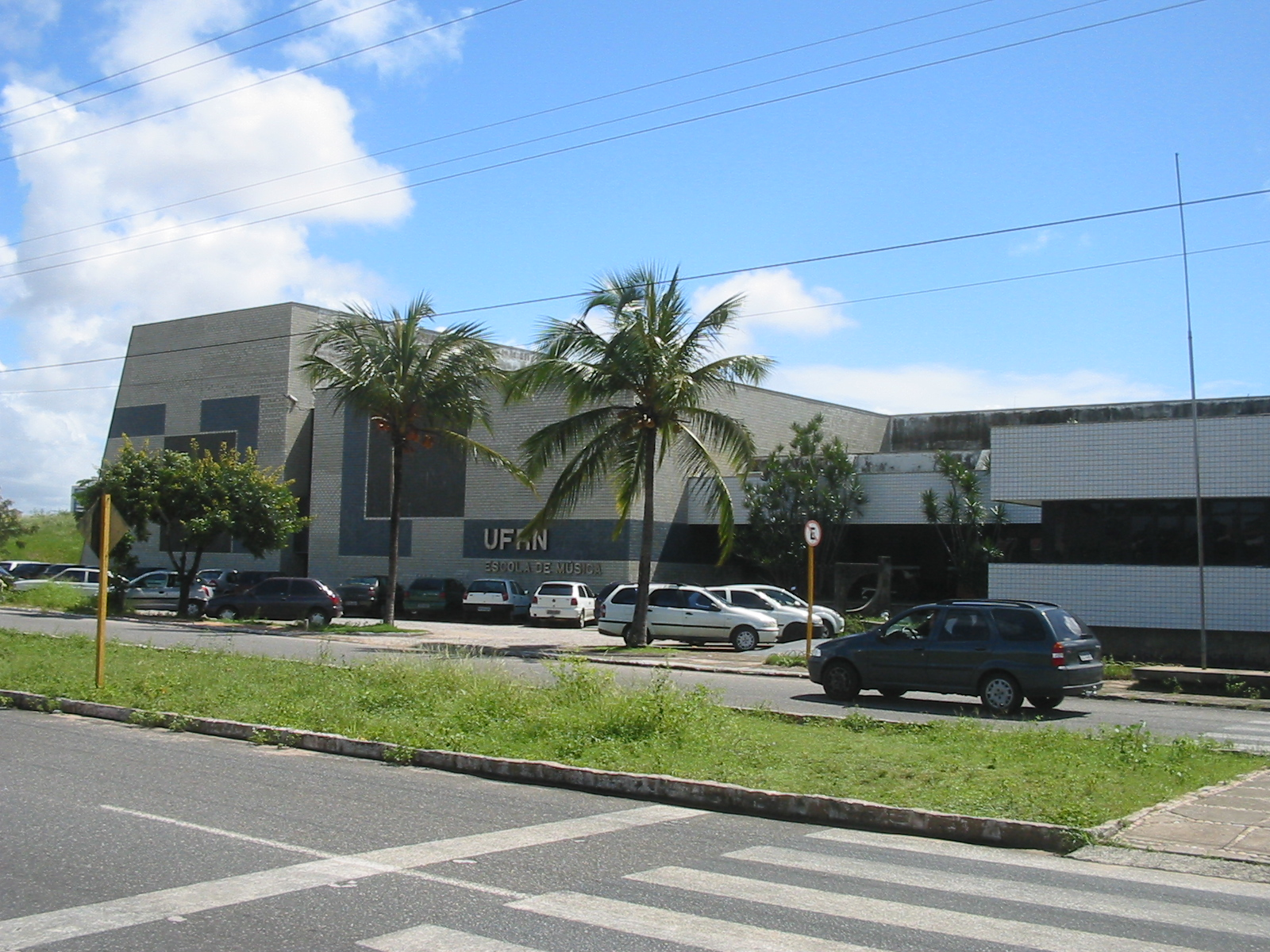
Federal University of Rio Grande do Norte in Natal, considered one of the best in the country.

Portuguese is the official national language, and thus the primary language taught in schools, but English and Spanish are part of the official high school curriculum.

==== Educational institutions ====
- Universidade Federal do Rio Grande do Norte (UFRN) (Federal University of Rio Grande do Norte);
- Universidade Estadual do Rio Grande do Norte (UERN) (State University of Rio Grande do Norte);
- Universidade Potiguar (UnP) (Potiguar University);
- Universidade Federal Rural do Semi-Árido (Ufersa) (Rural Federal University of Semi-Arid);
- Instituto Federal do Rio Grande do Norte (IFRN) (Federal Institute of Rio Grande do Norte);
- and many others.

== Economy ==
The service sector is the largest component of GDP at 65.2%, followed by the industrial sector at 30.2%. Agriculture represents 4.6% of GDP (2021). Rio Grande do Norte exports: fish and crustacean 30.5%, fruits 19.3%, woven of cotton 12.3%, petroleum 10.8%, cashew 8.5%, sugar 5.3%, chocolate 3.9%, sea salt 3.7% (2002).

Share of the Brazilian economy: 1.9% (2021).

Historically, Rio Grande do Norte has relied upon sugar and cattle for its livelihood. However, since the 1980s, the state government has realised that tourism is a lucrative industry, and more money is being poured into the construction of tourist resorts, and restoring colonial buildings in major cities.

Fruit is also grown in Rio Grande do Norte, with the state supplying 70% of Brazil's melons, and the state is famed for its mango and cashew fields. The world's largest cashew tree is located in the state; it has a circumference of 500 metres and occupies an area of 7,300 cm^{2}, making it 70 times the size of average cashew trees. Rio Grande do Norte is also one of three Brazilian states that together produce the world's entire supply of carnauba wax.

== Infrastructure ==
According to research by Fundação Dom Cabral, Rio Grande do Norte is the state with the second-best infrastructure in the Northeast Region and ninth in the country.

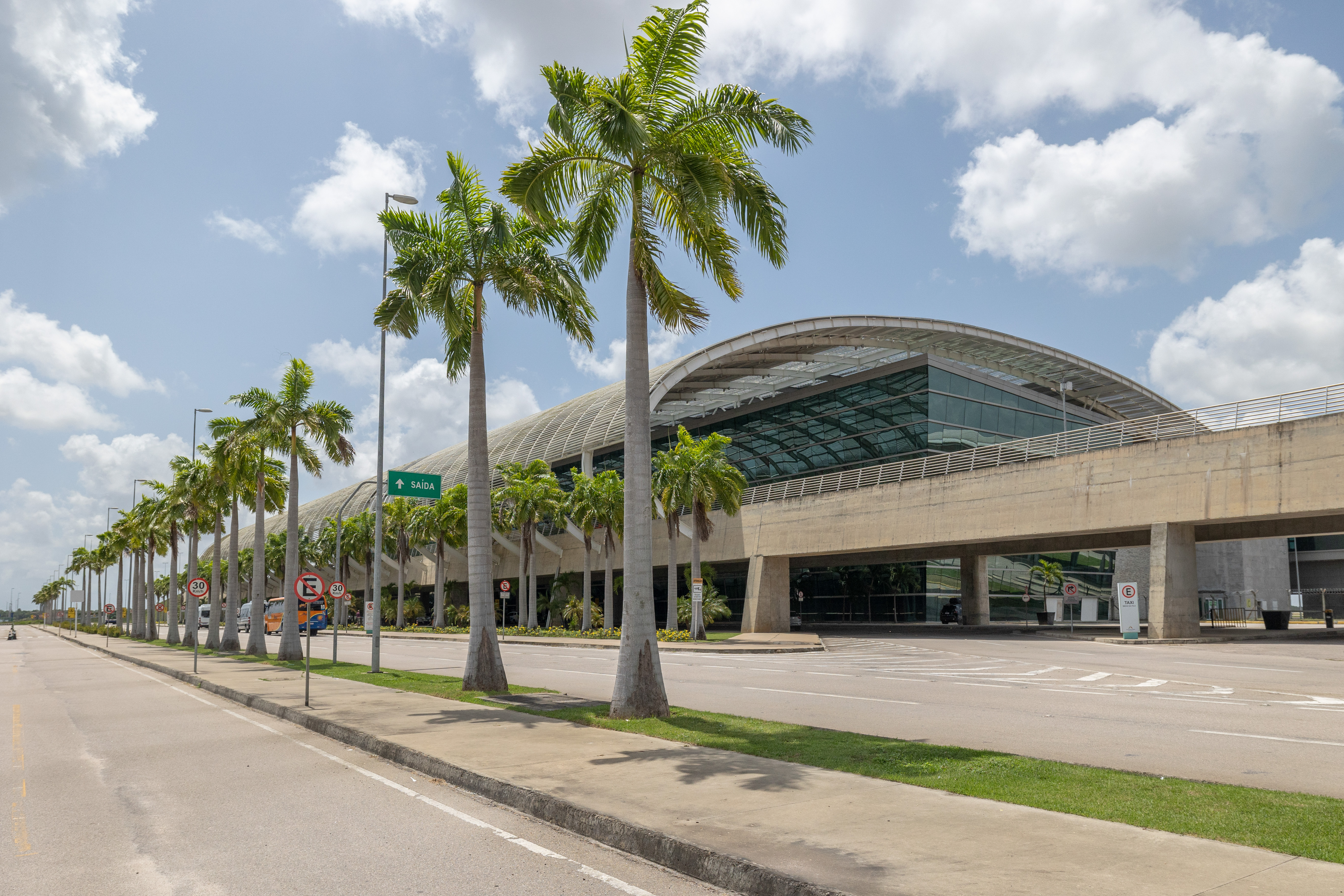
Greater Natal International Airport.

=== International Airport ===
Augusto Severo Airport has ceased to be Greater Natal International Airport since summer 2014. The new airport, situated outside the city, is in São Gonçalo do Amarante. Located virtually at sea level (169 ft), with favorable weather and geographic conditions, Augusto Severo International Airport in Parnamirim is 18 kilometers from Natal (RN). It takes its name from Augusto Severo de Albuquerque Maranhão, a native son of that state who died in an accident in France in 1902. The airport has a total area of 11.3 thousand square meters and capacity for 1.2 million passengers a year. The installations and passenger terminals are air conditioned with equipment that can put out 630 tons of cooled air. With an area of 5.5 million square meters, the airport complex operates with 16,482 square meters of passenger and cargo terminals and administrative and maintenance installations. There are 6,224 meters of runways and 61.5 square meters of apron space, providing connections from the greater Natal region to the main centers of the world. The airport is the only one in the Northeast Region to receive charter flights from Scandinavia.

=== Highways ===
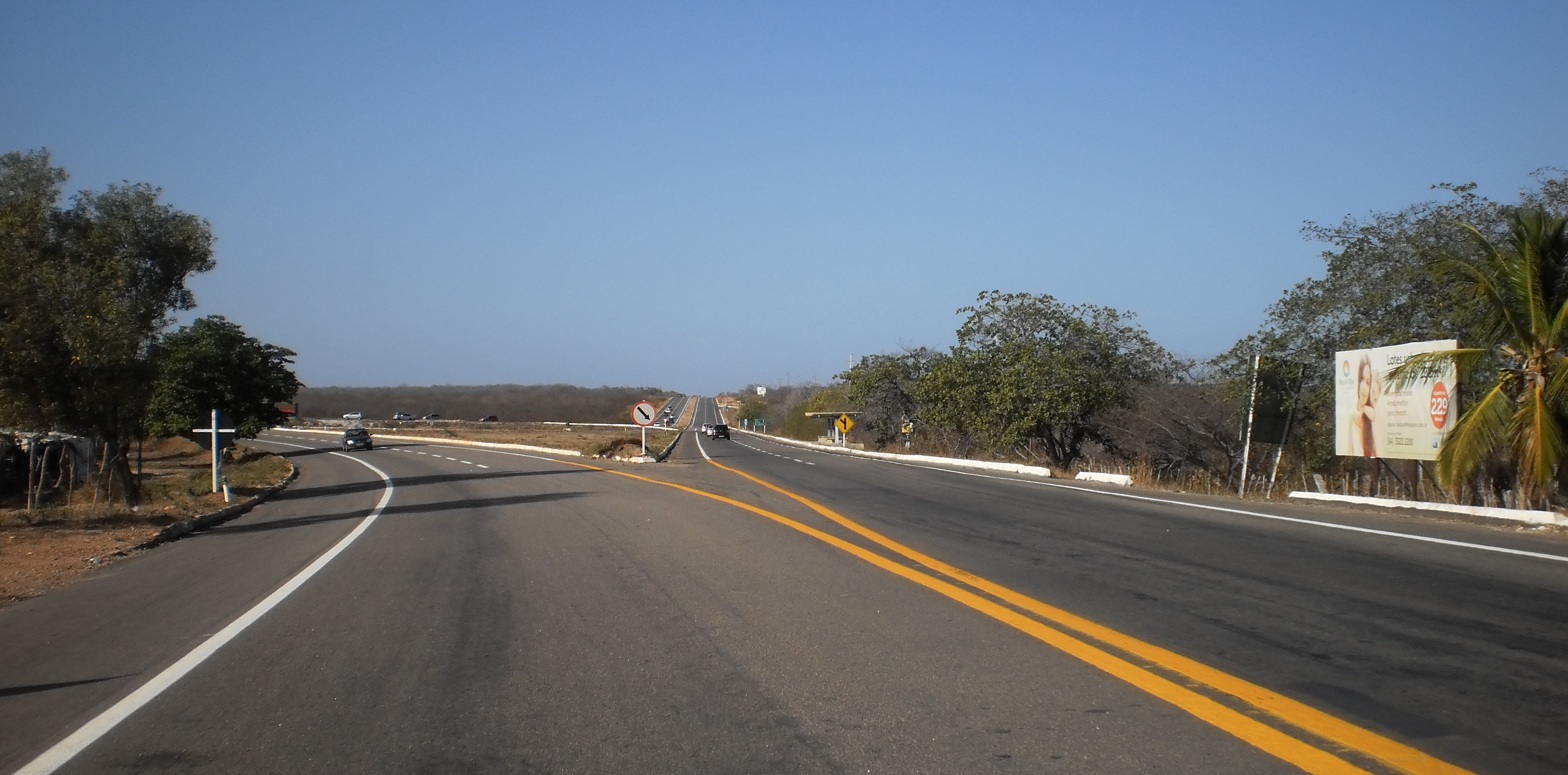
BR-304 highway.

- BR-101;
- BR-104;
- BR-110;
- BR-226;
- BR-304;
- BR-405;
- BR-406;
- BR-427;
- RN-117;
- RN-401.

=== Port ===
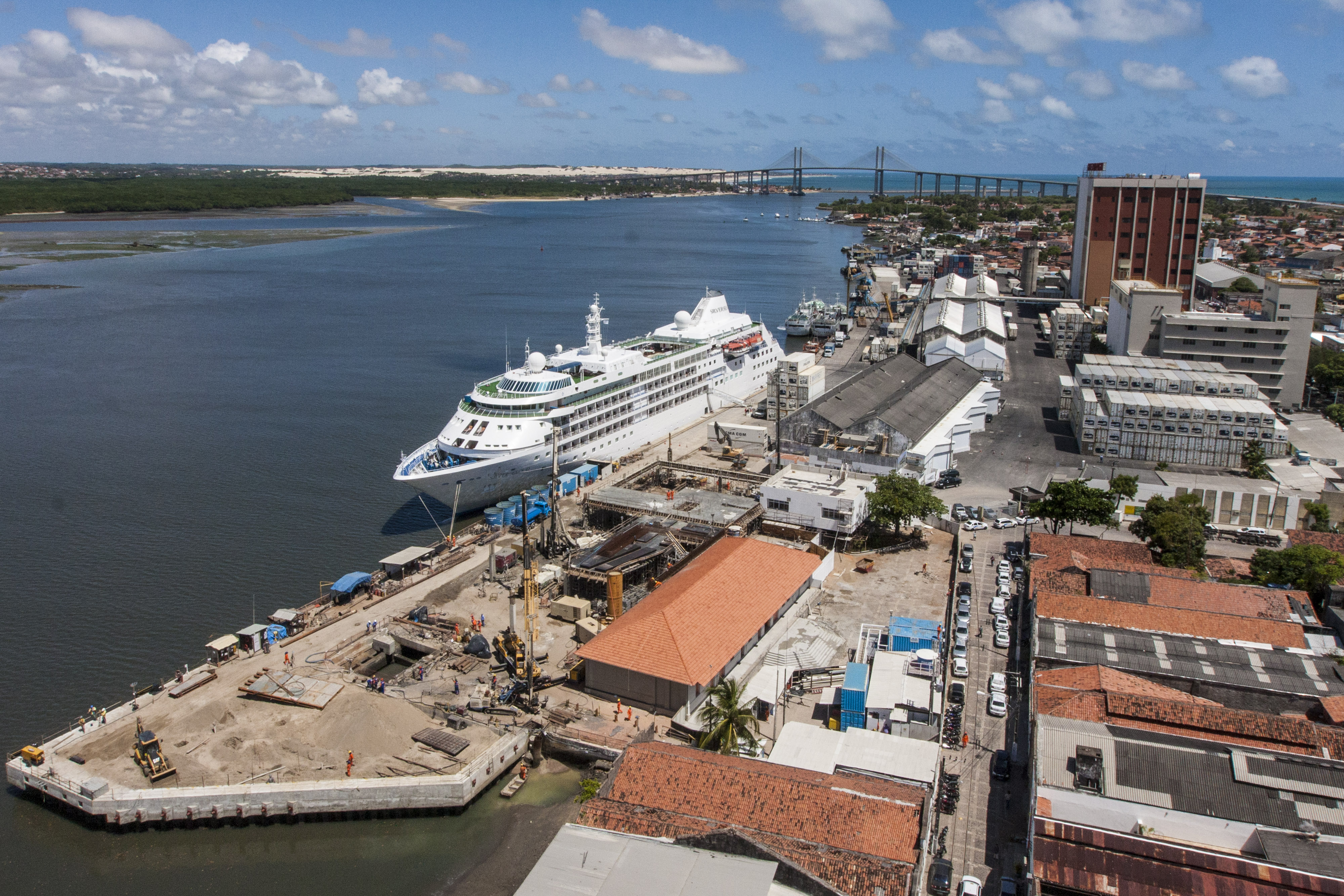
Entrance of the Port of Natal

The Port of Natal is specialized in cold storage cargo such as fruit, fish and shrimp, among others. It has its own customs facilities and is connected to Europe by direct navigation lines, mainly to the ports of Vigo, Rotterdam and Sheerness.

== Culture ==
=== Saint John's Day ===
Festa Junina was introduced to Northeastern Brazil by the Portuguese for whom St John's day (also celebrated as Midsummer Day in several European countries), on 24 June, is one of the oldest and most popular celebrations of the year. Differently, of course, from what happens on the European Midsummer Day, the festivities in Brazil do not take place during the summer solstice but during the tropical winter solstice. The festivities traditionally begin after 12 June, on the eve of St Anthony's day, and last until the 29th, which is Saint Peter's day. During these fifteen days, there are bonfires, fireworks, and folk dancing in the streets. Once exclusively a rural festival, today in Brazil it is largely an urban festival during which people joyfully and theatrically mimic peasant stereotypes and clichés in a spirit of jokes and good times. Typical refreshments and dishes are served. Similar to during Carnival, these festivities involve costume-wearing (in this case, peasant costumes), dancing, heavy drinking, and visual spectacles (fireworks display and folk dancing). Like what happens on Midsummer and St John's Day in Europe, bonfires are a central part of these festivities in Brazil.

== Sports ==
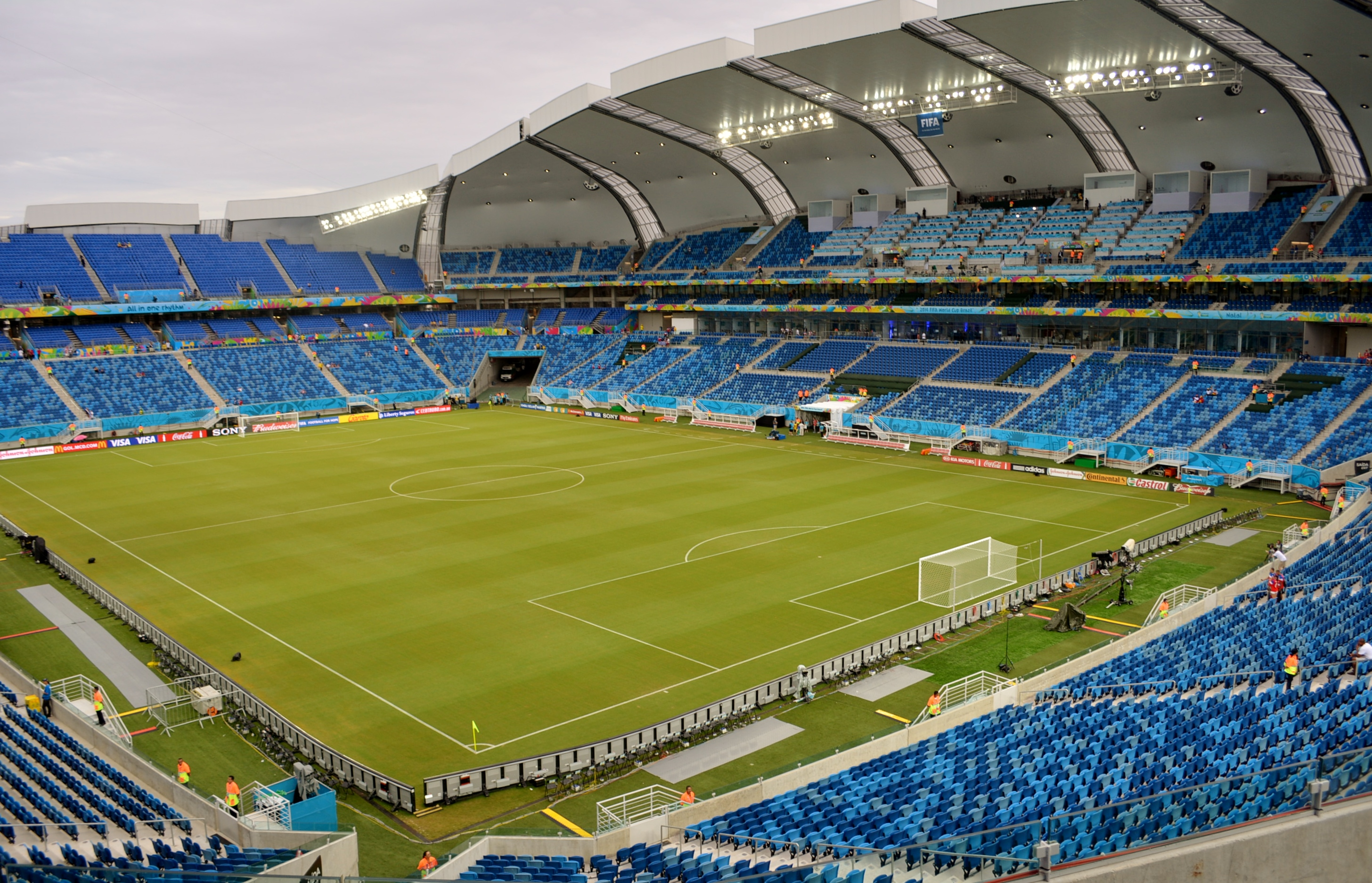
Arena das Dunas in Natal.

Natal, the capital of the state, was one of 12 cities to host games of the 2014 FIFA World Cup held in Brazil.

The three main football clubs in Natal are ABC, Alecrim and América Futebol Clube. ABC and America are the biggest rivals, and their match is often referred as Clássico Rei (King Classic).

The state is one of the member states of the World Sports Alliance.

== Flag ==
The flag of Rio Grande do Norte was adopted on 3 December 1957. It is based on a design by Luís da Câmara Cascudo. In the middle of the flag is the coat of arms of the state, which was adopted on 1 July 1909. It shows a sailing boat at the coast in the middle, representing the fishing and salt industries. Above it is a bar which shows two flowers on the sides and two cotton bolls in the center. To the sides of the shield are a coconut palm to the right and a carnauba palm to the left, connected by two branches of sugar cane. The star above represents the state as part of Brazil.

== See also ==
- List of governors of Rio Grande do Norte
- List of municipalities in Rio Grande do Norte
