= São José de Mipibu =

Municipality in Rio Grande do Norte, Brazil

Coordinates: 6°05′S 35°15′W

- Municipality
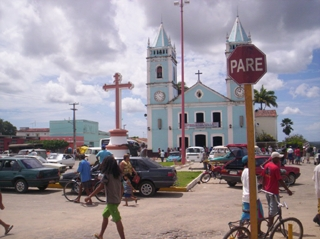

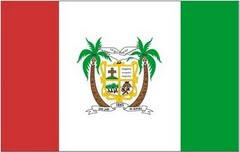
- Flag Coat of arms
- Interactive map of São José de Mipibu
- Country: Brazil
- Region: Nordeste
- State: Rio Grande do Norte
- Mesoregion: Leste Potiguar

Population (2020)
  - Total: 44,236
- Time zone: UTC−3 (BRT)

São José de Mipibu is a municipality in the state of Rio Grande do Norte in the Northeast region of Brazil.

== See also ==
- List of municipalities in Rio Grande do Norte
