= Cashew of Pirangi =

Largest known cashew tree, in Brazil

Coordinates: 5.978657°S 35.123372°W

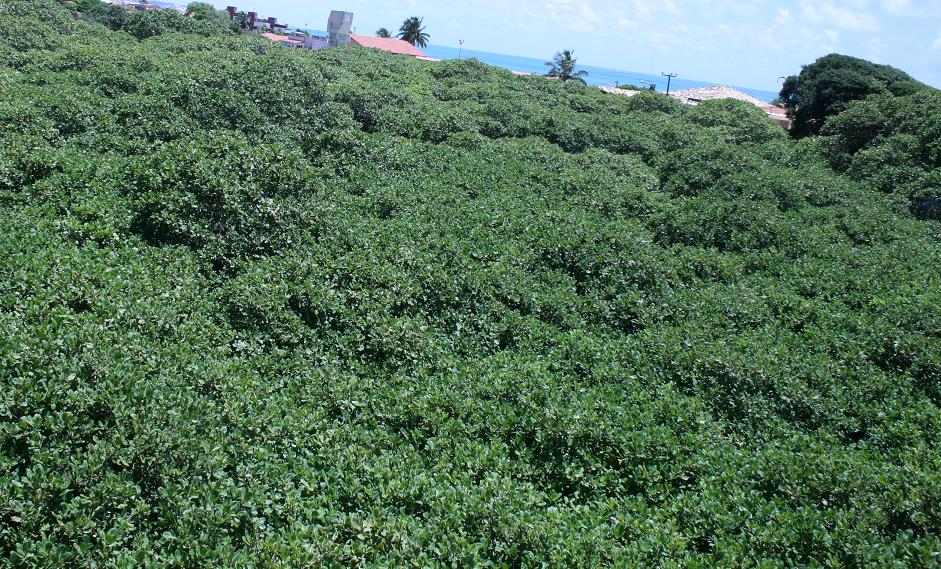
View of the world's largest cashew tree

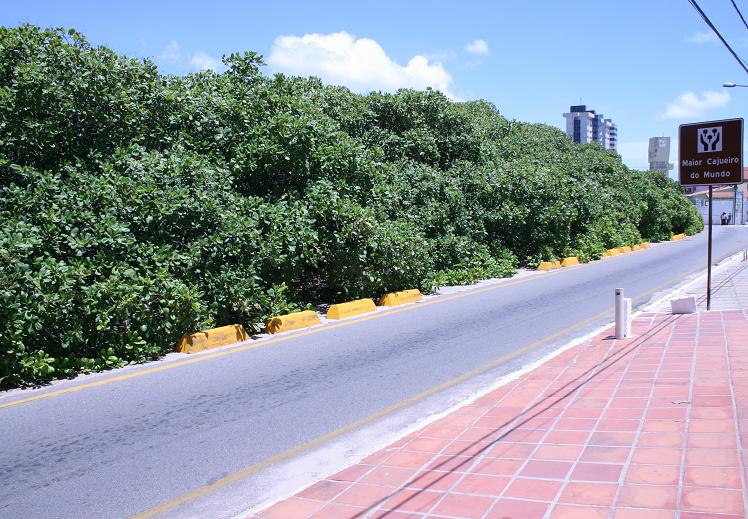
View from intersecting road Rota do Sol (en: Route of the Sun)

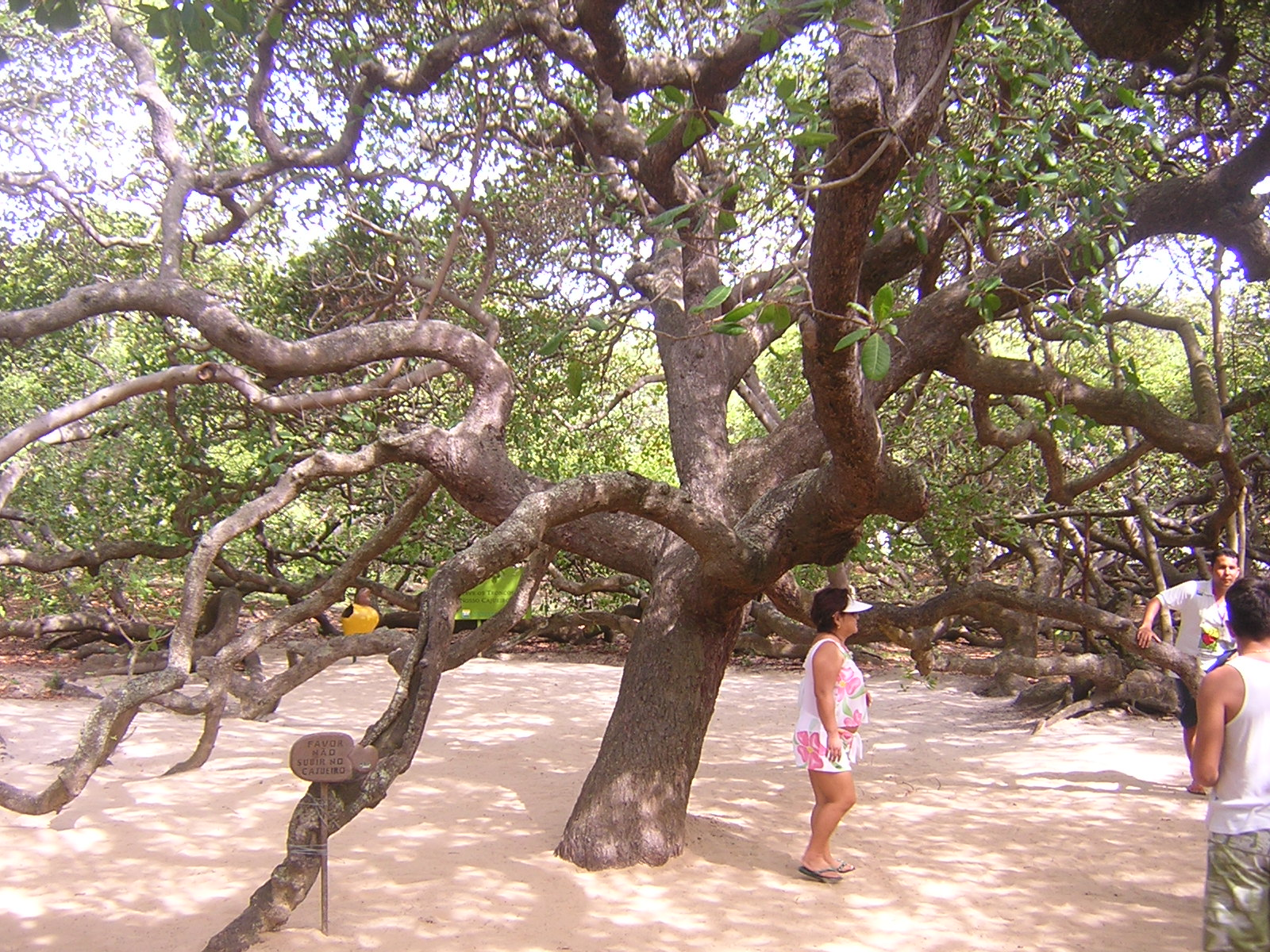
View of the interior with individuals for size comparison

The Cashew Tree of Pirangi (Cajueiro de Pirangi [kaʒuˈe(j)ɾu d(ʒ)i piɾɐ̃ˈʒi]), also called the world's largest cashew tree (maior cajueiro do mundo [majˈɔ(ʁ) kaʒuˈe(j)ɾu du ˈmũdu]), is a cashew tree in Pirangi do Norte, Rio Grande do Norte, Brazil. It covers an area between 7,300 square metres (1.8 acres) and 8,400 square metres (2.1 acres). Having the size of 70 normally sized cashew trees, its branches spread to a circumference of 500 m (1,600 ft).

As the tree's spreading branches bend towards the ground under their own weight, they tend to take new roots where they touch the ground. This may be seen in the images of the interior. It is now difficult to distinguish the initial trunk from the rest of the tree.

Based on its growth characteristics, the tree is estimated to be more than a thousand years old. The tree produces over 60,000 fruits each year.

Flávio Nogueira, Jr., the state secretary of tourism for Piauí, has claimed that another cashew tree in the municipality of Cajueiro da Praia in Piauí is larger, covering an area of 8,800 square metres (2.2 acres). That tree was studied by a laboratory from the State University of Piauí.

== See also ==
- List of individual trees
