= Cravolândia =

Municipality of Bahia, Brazil

Cravolândia Município de Cravolândia
- Municipality
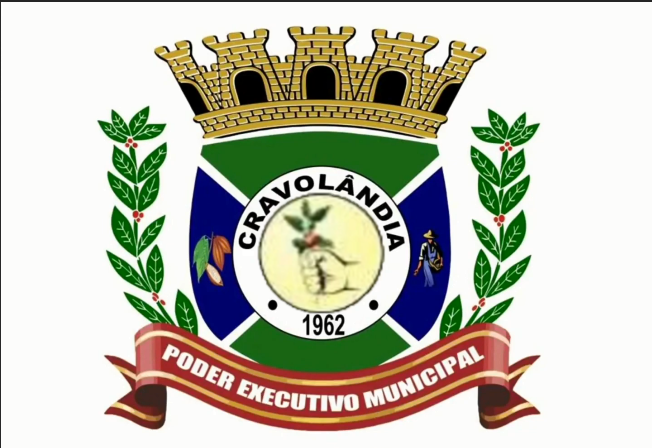
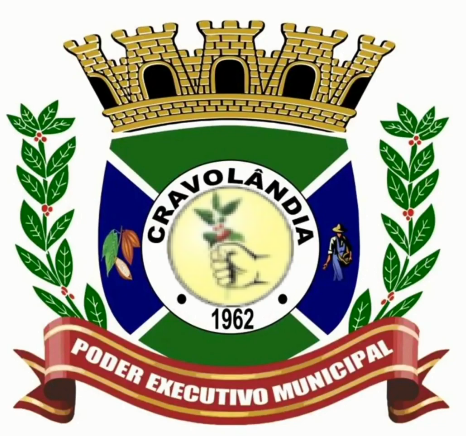
- Flag Coat of arms

- Location of Cravolândia in Bahia

- Location of Cravolândia in the Brazil
- Coordinates: 13°21′32″S 39°48′54″W
- Country: Brazil
- Region: Northeast
- State: Bahia
- Founded: December 8, 1962

Government
  - Mayor: Naelson de Souza Lemos (PT)

Area
  - Total: 182.585 km^{2} (70.496 sq mi)

Population (2020)
  - Total: 5,351
  - Density: 29.31/km^{2} (75.90/sq mi)
- Demonym: Cravolandense
- Time zone: UTC−3 (BRT)

Cravolândia (Portuguese: Cloveland) is a municipality in the state of Bahia in the North-East region of Brazil. Cravolândia covers 182.585 km^{2} (70.496 mi^{2}), and has a population of 5,351 with a population density of 31 inhabitants per square kilometer. It borders the municipalities of Santa Inês, Itaquara, Ubaíra and Wenceslau Guimarães. Cravolândia is located 317 kilometres (197 mi) from Salvador, the state capital of Bahia, and is connected to Salvador by federal highways BR-116 and BR-101.

== History ==
Cravolândia takes its name from the first mayor of the municipality, Mario da Silva Cravo.^{A} Cravo was a coffee producer and a noted a noted brand of coffee, Café Cravo, was produced and exported from Cravolândia in the 1950s. The coffee crop was decimated by agricultural pests in the 1960s. Small-scale coffee cultivation resumed in the 1970s but has never reached the levels of production of earlier decades.

Cravolândia was originally part of a region known as Olhos D'Água do Carrasco, a reference to its role as a place for drovers to stop for water in the movement of their livestock. This name was replaced by Igatiquira, an indigenous name meaning "small ounce". Cravolândia was originally part of the municipality of Jequiriça and later of Santa Inês. It became an independent municipality under Bahia State Law no. 1714 on July 16, 1962.

== Footnotes ==
A.Mario da Silva Cravo is the father and grandfather of the Bahian artists Mário Cravo Júnior (1923-2018) and Mário Cravo Neto (1947-2009). Cravo Júnior and Cravo Neto, however, were born and raised in Salvador, and were not residents of Cravolândia.

== See also ==
- List of municipalities in Bahia
