= Microregion of Litoral Nordeste =

Coordinates: 5°11′56″S 35°27′39″W

Litoral Nordeste
- Microregion
- Country: Brazil
- State: Rio Grande do Norte
- Mesoregion: Leste Potiguar

Litoral Nordeste was a microregion in the Brazilian state of Rio Grande do Norte.

== Municipalities ==
The microregion consisted of the following municipalities:

- Maxaranguape
- Pedra Grande
- Pureza
- Rio do Fogo
- São Miguel do Gostoso
- Taipu
- Touros
