= Touros =

Municipality in Rio Grande do Norte, Brazil

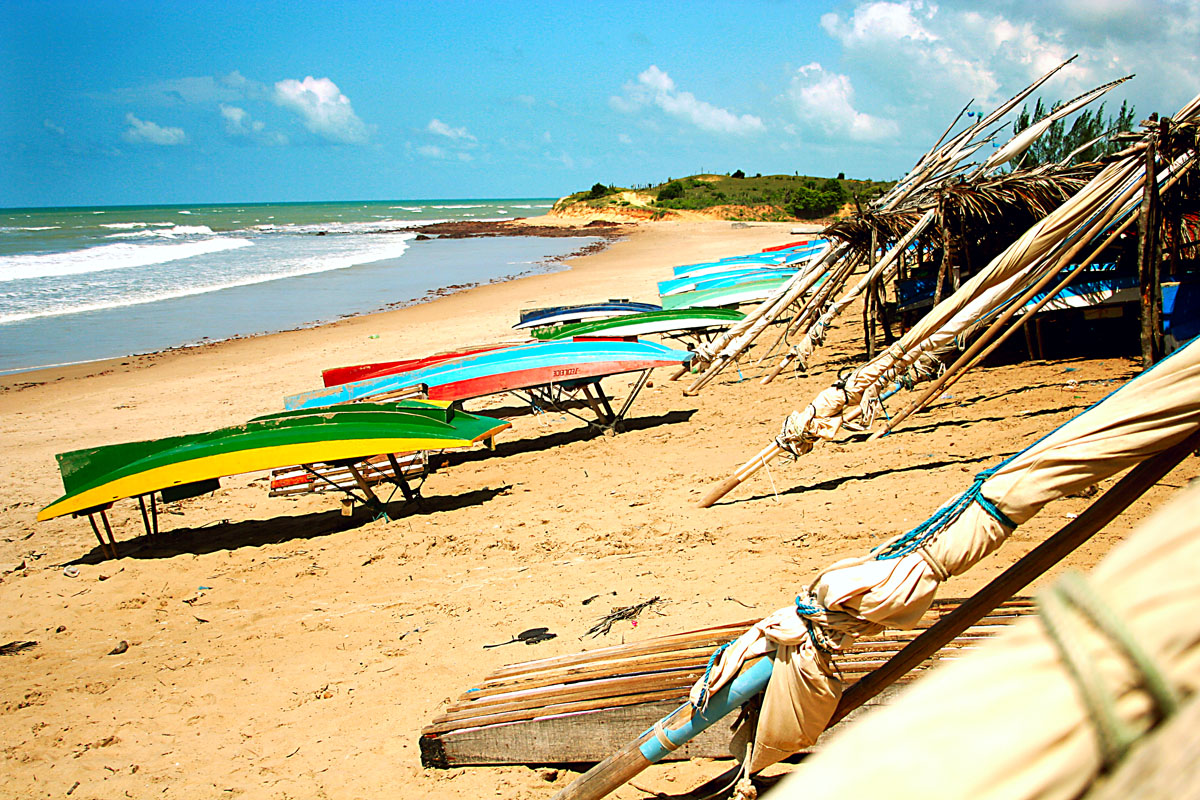
- A beach in Touros named Lagoa do Sal

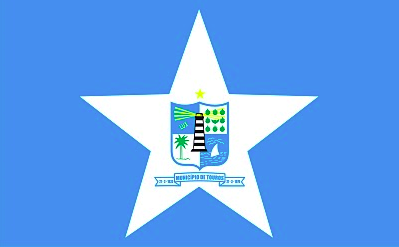
- Flag Coat of arms
- Nickname: Esquina do Brazil (Brazil's Corner)
- Location in Rio Grande do Norte and Brazil
- Coordinates: 05°11′56″S 35°27′39″W
- Country: Brazil
- Region: Northeast
- State: Rio Grande do Norte
- Settled: March 27, 1835

Government
  - Mayor: Pedro Ferreira de Farias Filho (PROS)

Area
  - Total: 753.961 km^{2} (291.106 sq mi)

Population (2020)
  - Total: 33 503
  - Density: 40.21/km^{2} (104.1/sq mi)
- Time zone: UTC−3 (BRT)

Touros (lit. "bulls") is a municipality in Rio Grande do Norte, Brazil. It is known as "Brazil's Corner" because it is located at the northeast corner of the country, being the closest South American city to Africa (2,841 km (1534 knots) from Kabrousse in southwestern Senegal). Touros has many varieties of fish, and there is a nearby seawater basin in the ocean formed by banks of coral.

Bordering municipalities include Rio do Fogo to the southeast, Pureza to the south, João Câmara to the southwest, Parazinho further to the west and São Miguel do Gostoso to the northwest.

Touros is near Rio Carnaubinha.

== Districts ==
Touros are divided into 27 districts and subdivisions:

- Arribão
- Assentamento Aracati
- Assentamento Canudos
- Assentamento Chico Mendes I
- Assentamento Chico Mendes II
- Assentamento Planalto do Retiro
- Santo Antônio
- Baixa do Quinquim
- Boa Cica
- Boqueirão
- Cajá
- Cajueiro
- Carnaubal
- Carnaubinha
- Geral
- Golandim
- Lagoa de Serra Verde
- Lagoa do Sal
- Monte Alegre
- Perobas
- Santa Luzia
- São José
- Tubiba
- Vila Assis
- Vila Israel
- Vila Mayne
- Zabelê.

== History ==
In the 1790s, a drought occurred in Rio Grande do Norte in the last decade brought agricultural farms and workers into Touros, where the land was fertile and for use in agriculture.

The settlement became a district on September 5, 1823, and later in 1832, the parish of Bom Jesus de Navegantes was formed and later on April 11, 1833, the resolution of the provincial council elevated Touros to a town, it also separated from Ceará-Mirim (now the state of Ceara) and became part of Rio Grande do Norte. The municipality was created under provincial law no. 21 on March 27, 1835.

Its municipality was large, it had 180 km of coastline. Later, its own municipalities were created from Touros including Maxaranguape, Pureza in 1962 and São Miguel do Gostoso (ex-São Miguel de Touros).

== Area attractions ==
Brazil's The second largest lighthouse, the Farol do Calcanhar is in the city of Touros. The vila Galé hotel is also a tourist attraction

== Transportation ==
The northernmost section of the BR-101 highway is located in Touros, which is the longest highway in Brazil.

== Flag and seal ==
Its seal is a crest which features the main attraction, the lighthouse in the middle. Inside has four parts, purple on top left and bottom left and the other two white, on bottom left is a palm tree and on the bottom right is a sailboat in the waters.

Its flag color is light blue with a white start, inside is the coat of arms but has its parts in light blue.

== Nature ==
Not only fauna that the area has but even in the seas, where there are marine such as fishes, mollusks and others. One cone snail species native to the Atlantic of the east of Touros is Conus tourosensis which has been recently described in March 2018.
