= João Câmara, Rio Grande do Norte =

Municipality in Rio Grande do Norte, Brazil

Municipality of João Câmara
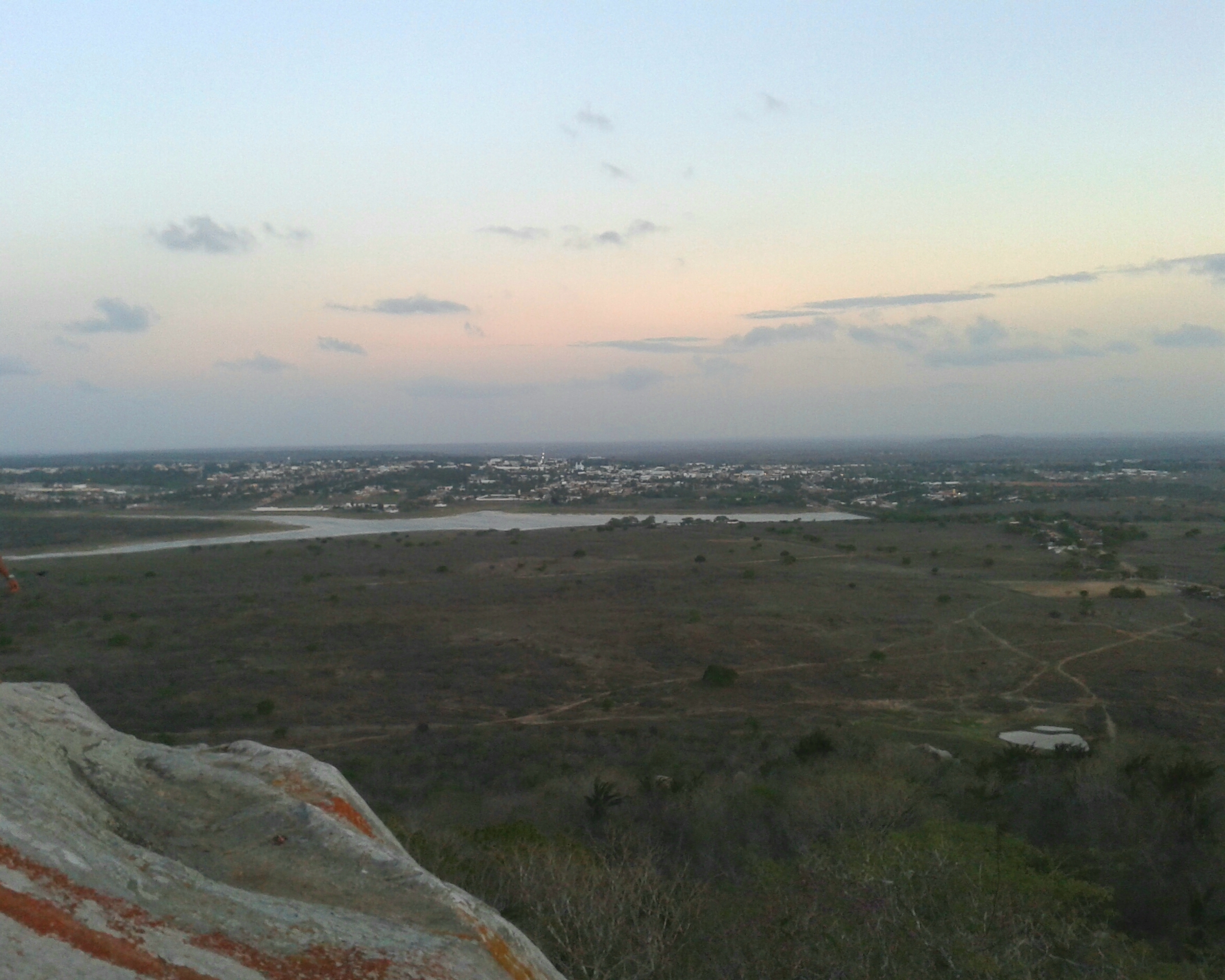
- View of João Câmara

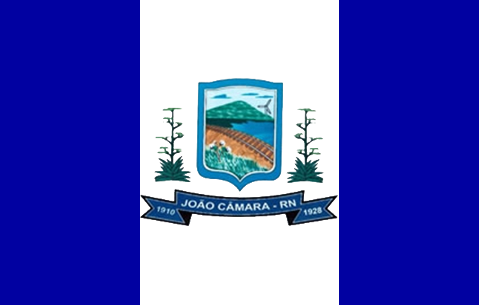
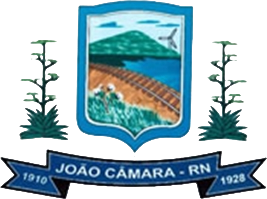
- Flag Coat of arms
- Nicknames: "Terra dos abalos" (Earthquakes land) "Capital do mato grande" (Mato Grande's capital)
- Location in Rio Grande do Norte and Brazil
- Coordinates: 05°32′16″S 35°49′12″W
- Country: Brazil
- Region: Northeast
- State: Rio Grande do Norte
- Founded: 29 October 1928

Government
  - Mayor: Ariosvaldo "Vavá" Targino de Araújo (DEM)

Area
  - Total: 714.951 km^{2} (276.044 sq mi)
- Elevation: 160 m (520 ft)

Population (2020)
  - Total: 35,160
  - Density: 47.6/km^{2} (123/sq mi)
- Time zone: UTC−3 (BRT)
- HDI (2010): 0.595 – medium
- Website: joaocamara.rn.gov.br

João Câmara is a municipality in the state of Rio Grande do Norte, Brazil. The municipality was founded on 29 October 1928.

João Câmara borders eight municipalities, three of which are Touros to the northeast, Pureza to the east and Parazinho to the north.
