= Quilombo Caçandoca =

Caçandoca is a Brazilian quilombo, the first in the country recognized on Navy lands. It occupies an area of 890 hectares, and is located in the municipality of Ubatuba, on the north coast of São Paulo, 250 kilometers from the capital.

== Community ==
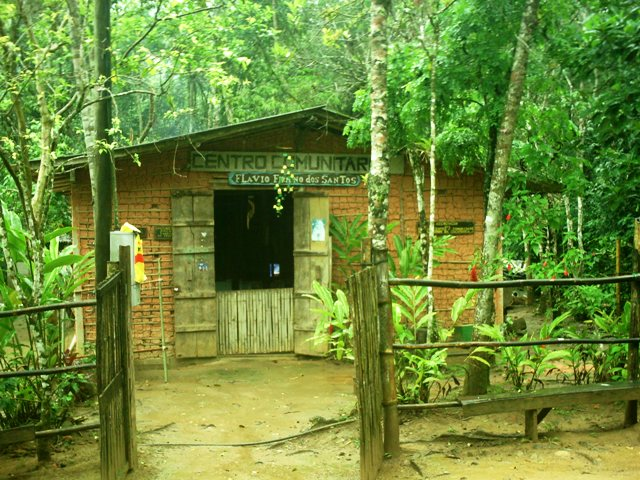
Caçandoca is a Brazilian quilombo, the first in the country recognized on Navy lands.

The quilombo occupies areas of the beach and hinterland of Caçandoca, including the towns of Praia do Pulso, Caçandoca, Caçandoquinha, Bairro Alto, Saco da Raposa, São Lourenço, Saco do Morcego, Saco da Banana and Praia do Simão.

There are two deactivated schools, a church and two cemeteries in the region. There is evidence that, in the cemetery on Caçandoca road, the dead of the lord's family were buried. The other cemetery is between Saco da Aguda and Saco da Cotia, and slaves were buried there. There are also reports that the bodies of black people who died on slave ships during the journey from Africa to Brazil were thrown into the place known as the black hole.

The old sugarcane mill is in the process of being listed.

== History ==
The area of the current quilombo was occupied in the 19th century by a coffee and slave farm, which in 1858 was acquired by José Antunes de Sá. There was also sugar cane cultivation and a mill for its processing.

In 1881, the farm was dismembered. After abolition, some of the former slaves moved to other locations, but some of them remained on the land, as squatters, cultivating mainly bananas and cassava.

It is estimated that, in the 1960s, the total population of the Caçandoca community was around 70 families, totaling 800 people, the majority of whom were of African descent (black and mixed race).

=== Conflict ===
The ruins of the mansion were demolished in 1974, when the expansion of the BR-101 highway increased real estate speculation and land conflicts in the region. A company, Urbanizadora Continental, acquired a 210-hectare plot for the construction of summer homes, but began to monitor an area of 410 hectares. Several families were expelled from their lands, having to leave the community to live in cities close to the coast and the Paraíba Valley.

In 1997, descendants of slaves occupied an area occupied by Continental. In September 1998, the company obtained an injunction giving it the right to repossess the land. It was when the quilombolas founded the Association of the Community of Quilombo da Caçandoca Remnants and asked the São Paulo State Land Institute for land regularization.

In 2000, an Itesp study identified families descending from slaves living in the region and threatened by real estate speculation. In the same year, Caçandoca was recognized as a remaining quilombo community.

A new occupation of the land was promoted in 2001, along the side road that connects Caçandoca to BR-101. The occupation was authorized by a court decision that revoked the injunction previously issued by Continental. In September 2006, the federal government expropriated the company's land, to give the quilombolas the property titles.

Land regularization, however, covers only 210 hectares, of the 890 hectares claimed by the community.

== Survival ==
The quilombo remnant communities of Caçandoca, in Ubatuba, had their origins recognized by federal and state bodies, but they still do not have permission to plant and build their houses, in addition to taking care of the maintenance of the area, which is constantly invaded by animal hunters. and land grabbers.

Many residents of the community are white people who married black people. They live in some of the wattle and daub houses already built, as the population is prevented, by current environmental laws, from expanding the built area.

The remaining people live with resources that come from their work such as fishing, shellfish collection, in addition to banana production - their main productive activities. Some quilombolas work in domestic services in summer homes in luxury condominiums in the surrounding area and handicrafts contribute, in high season, to the family income.

The place that serves as a shelter has few physical and social conditions for survival, as it consists of a nature reserve with a beach and lots of greenery, which has become a delight in the eyes of everyone who passes through the region, even arousing the greed of large real estate companies.

== Bibliography ==
- ORTEGA, José. In the quilombo lands: The daily life and memories of the only quilombo in Brazilian navy lands.
- SCHMITT, Alessandra. Technical-Scientific Report on the Quilombo da Caçandoca Community, Municipality of Ubatuba/São Paulo. ITESP, São Paulo, June 2000.
- OLIVEIRA, L. Ayer de (Organizer). Quilombos: The Time and Turn of the Survivors. Pro-Indian Commission of São Paulo, São Paulo, 2001.
