= Teolândia =

Coordinates: 13°36′07″S 39°29′27″W

- Municipality
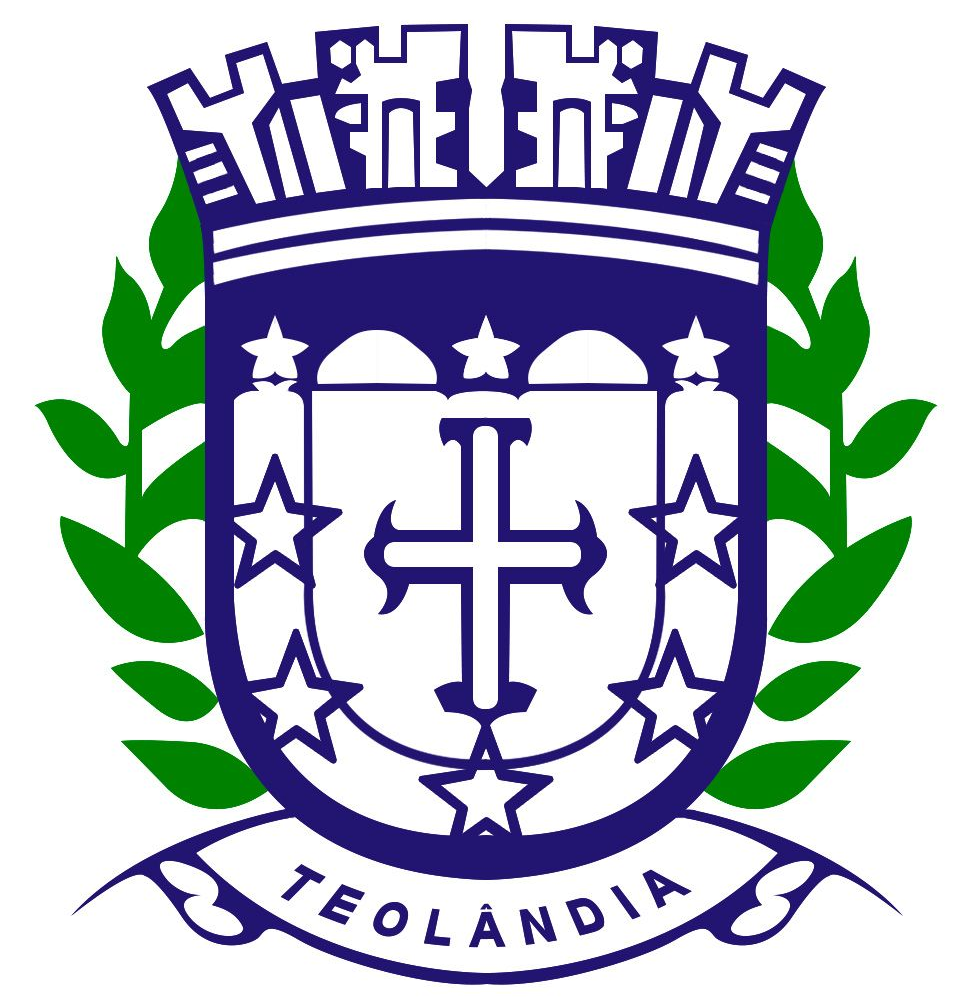
- Flag Coat of arms
- Interactive map of Teolândia
- Country: Brazil
- Region: Nordeste
- State: Bahia

Population (2020)
  - Total: 15,022
- Time zone: UTC−3 (BRT)

Teolândia is a municipality in the state of Bahia in the North-East region of Brazil.

The municipality contains part of the 230,296 hectares (569,070 acres) Caminhos Ecológicos da Boa Esperança Environmental Protection Area, created in 2003.

== See also ==
- List of municipalities in Bahia
