= São Miguel do Gostoso =

Municipality in Rio Grande do Norte, Brazil

Coordinates: 5°07′S 35°38′W

- Municipality
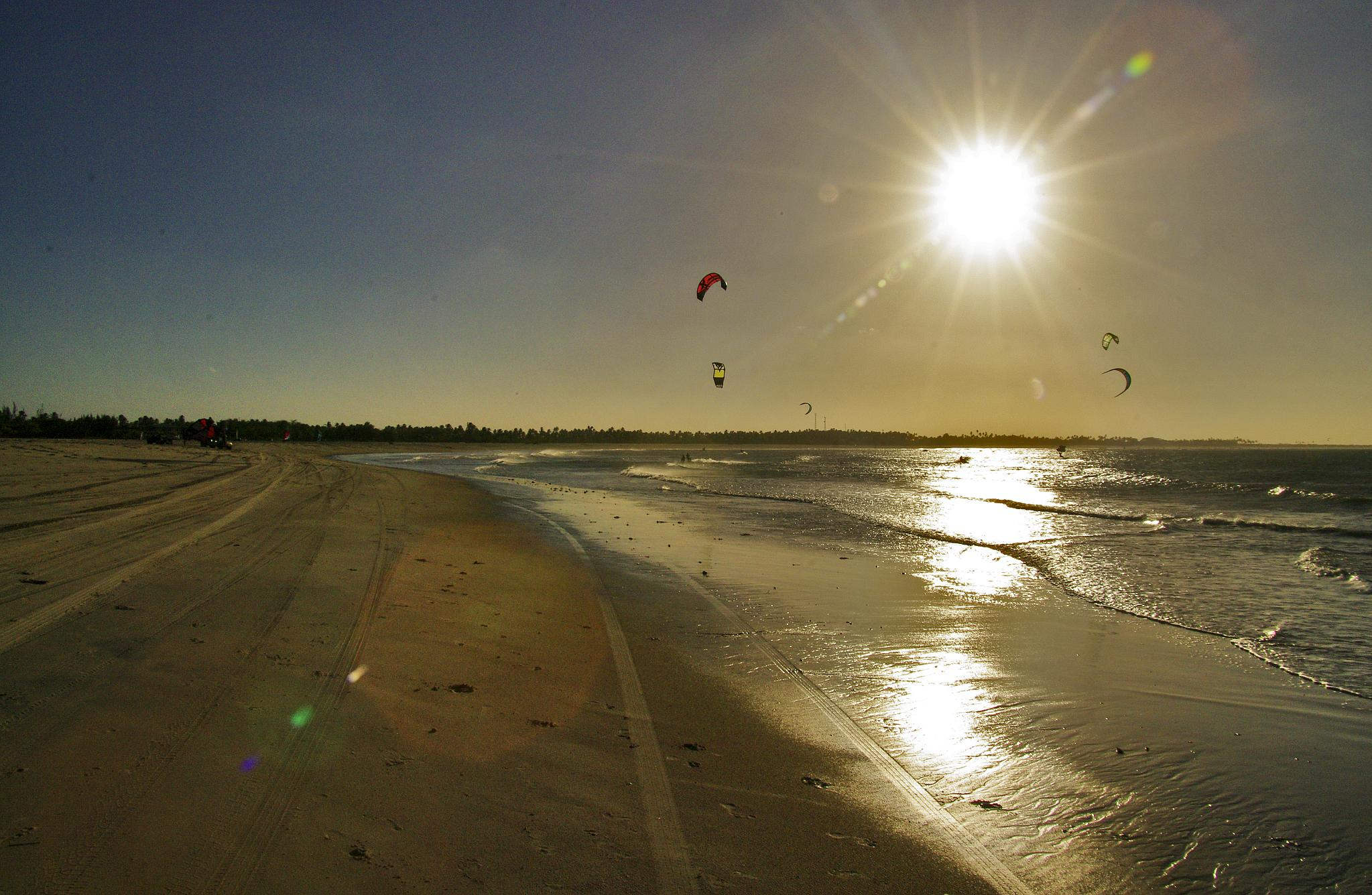

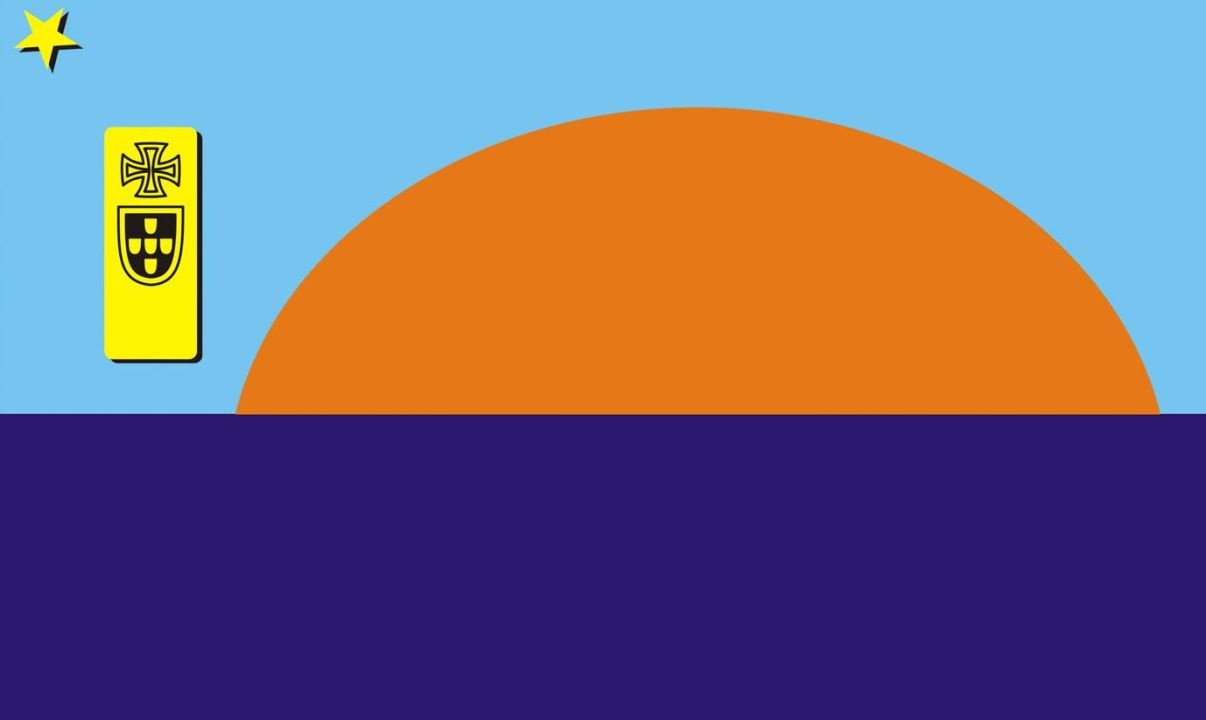
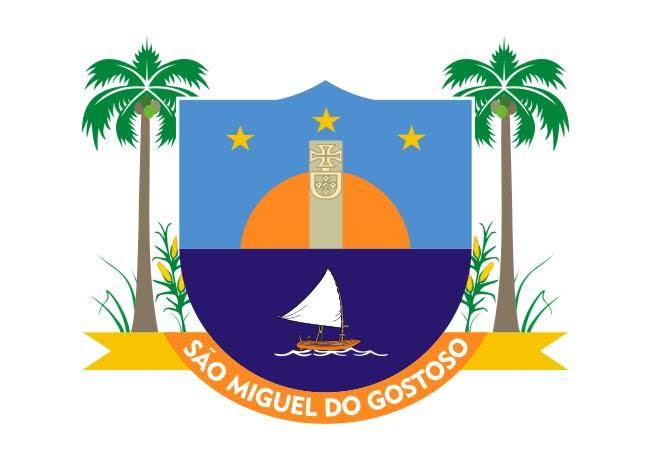
- Flag Coat of arms
- Interactive map of São Miguel do Gostoso
- Country: Brazil
- Region: Nordeste
- State: Rio Grande do Norte
- Mesoregion: Leste Potiguar

Population (2020)
  - Total: 10,362
- Time zone: UTC−3 (BRT)

São Miguel do Gostoso (previously known as São Miguel de Touros) is a municipality in the state of Rio Grande do Norte in the Northeast region of Brazil.

São Miguel do Gostoso was founded on 29 September 1884.

== History ==
On 16 July 1993, the beachfront town of São Miguel split from the municipality of Touros. The new municipality, São Miguel do Gostoso, held its first elections in 1996 and at this time it was decided that the town would retain its original name of São Miguel de Touros.

On 19 November 2000, a local referendum was held and voters decided to change the town's name to São Miguel do Gostoso.

== Name origin ==
According to legend, a town resident, Manoel Gostoso, provided accommodations to traveling salesmen. Gostoso became known for entertaining his guests with stories and jokes. The locals soon began to refer to the town as Gostoso, in honor of Manoel.

On 29 September 1899, Miguel Félix Martins built the first Roman Catholic first church in town, in honor of Saint Michaell. The locals then joined São Miguel to the previous name of Gostoso to create São Miguel do Gostoso.

== Access ==
São Miguel do Gostoso was accessible only by horseback, due to a lack of roads. In the 1960s the BR-101 and RN-221 (Project Pólo Costa das Dunas) roads were constructed to improve the access to Natal..

In the past the town houses were constructed mainly of "taipa" but are today mostly constructed in bricks and cement.

== Tourism ==
In 1989, the city only had one Pousada (local Bed & Breakfast). Today São Miguel do Gostoso has approximately 25 Pousadas, a variation of bars and restaurants and two kite and wind surf schools. The wind conditions attract many visitors for kite surfing and windsurfing

The municipality, in partnership with EMBRATUR, opened the São Miguel do Gostoso Tourist Office.

== General information ==
- Size: 345.9 km² (equivalent to 0.65% of the state of Rio Grande do Norte)
- Rain: Average 1038.3 mm
- Rainy Season: March to June
- Average Annual Temperature: 26,5 °C
- Average Annual Humidity: 68%
- Population: Approximately 10.000 inhabitants
- Economy: Tourism, Agriculture and Fishing
- Electricity: 220 V
- High speed internet: Yes
- Cell phone coverage: Yes

== List of beaches ==
These are the beaches of São Miguel do Gostoso:

- Praia Ponta do Santo Cristo
- Praia do Cardeiro
- Praia da Xêpa
- Praia do Maceió
- Praia de Tourinhos

== See also ==
- List of municipalities in Rio Grande do Norte
