= Caminhos Ecológicos da Boa Esperança Environmental Protection Area =

Protected area in Bahia, Brazil

- Área de Proteção Ambiental Caminhos Ecológicos da Boa Esperança
- IUCN category V (protected landscape/seascape)
- Location within Brazil
- Nearest city: Taperoá, Bahia
- Coordinates: 13.528802°S 39.136010°W
- Area: 230,296.39 hectares (569,074.8 acres)
- Designation: Environmental protection area
- Created: 5 June 2003
- Administrator: INEMA: Instituto do Meio Ambiente e Recursos Hídricos

The Caminhos Ecológicos da Boa Esperança (Note: Caminhos Ecológicos da Boa Esperança may be translated "Good Hope Ecological Paths") Environmental Protection Area (Portuguese: Área de Proteção Ambiental Caminhos Ecológicos da Boa Esperança) is an environmental protection area in the state of Bahia, Brazil.

== Location ==
The Caminhos Ecológicos da Boa Esperança Environmental Protection Area (APA) covers parts of the municipalities of Ubaíra, Jiquiriçá, Teolândia, Wenceslau Guimarães, Nilo Peçanha, Taperoá, Cairu and Valença. It has an estimated area of 230,296.39 hectares (569,074.8 acres). It covers an area to the south of Salvador along the Atlantic Coast, extending inland and including the Wenceslau Guimarães Ecological Station. It adjoins the Baía de Camamu Environmental Protection Area to the south.

== Environment ==
The APA is in the Atlantic Forest biome. Vegetation includes restinga and mangroves along the coast and rainforest in the interior, rising to montane forest. Fauna includes a wide range of mammals, birds, reptiles and so on, including endangered species such as the southern tamandua (Tamandua tetradactyla), sloth, coati and black-tufted marmoset (Callithrix penicillata). The main threats are deforestation, poaching and squatting in the area of permanent preservation.

== History ==
The Caminhos Ecológicos da Boa Esperança Environmental Protection Area was created by state governor decree 8.552 of 5 June 2003. It was to be administered by the Superintendency for Forest Development and Conservation Units (SFC). The purpose was to maintain the environmental quality of the territory it covered and to act as a buffer zone for the Wenceslau Guimarães Ecological Station. It became part of the Central Atlantic Forest Ecological Corridor, created in 2002.

== Sources ==
- APA Caminhos Ecológicos da Boa Esperança (in Portuguese), INEMA, archived from the original on 2021-10-22
- Gestão Costeira Carta 09 Baía de Todos os Santos (PDF) (in Portuguese), MMA
- Lamas, Ivana Reis; Crepaldi, Maria Otávia; Mesquita, Carlos Alberto Bernardo (2015), Uma Rede no Corredor (PDF) (in Portuguese), Conservação Internacional (CI-Brasil), ISBN 978-85-98830-28-5
- Souto, Paulo; Khoury, Jorge (5 June 2003), Decreto nº 8.552 de 05 de junho de 2003 (in Portuguese), Estado da Bahia, archived from the original on 26 October 2016
