= Nilo Peçanha, Bahia =

Municipality of Bahia, Brazil

Coordinates: 13°35′56″S 39°06′25″W

Nilo Peçanha
- Municipality
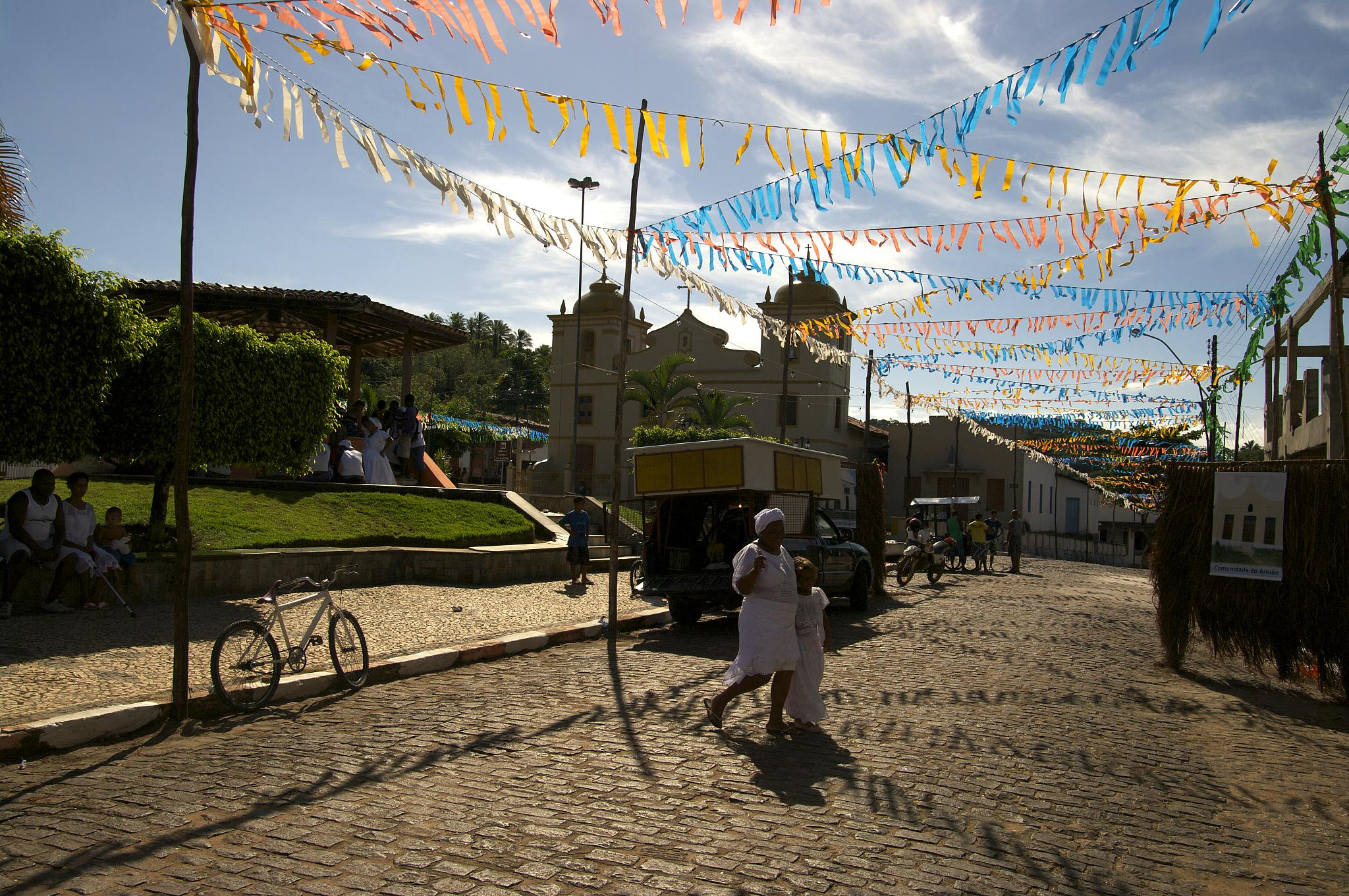

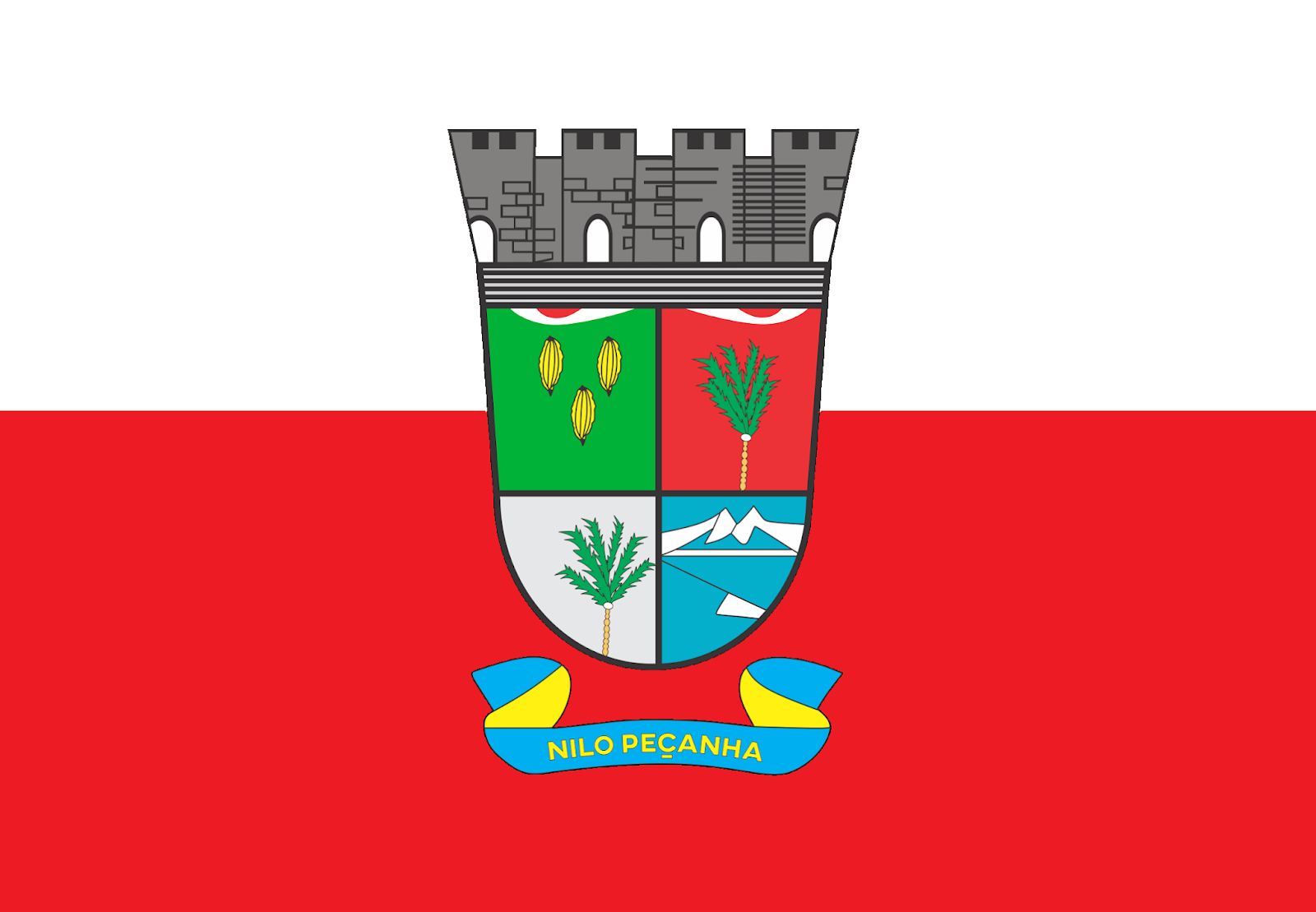
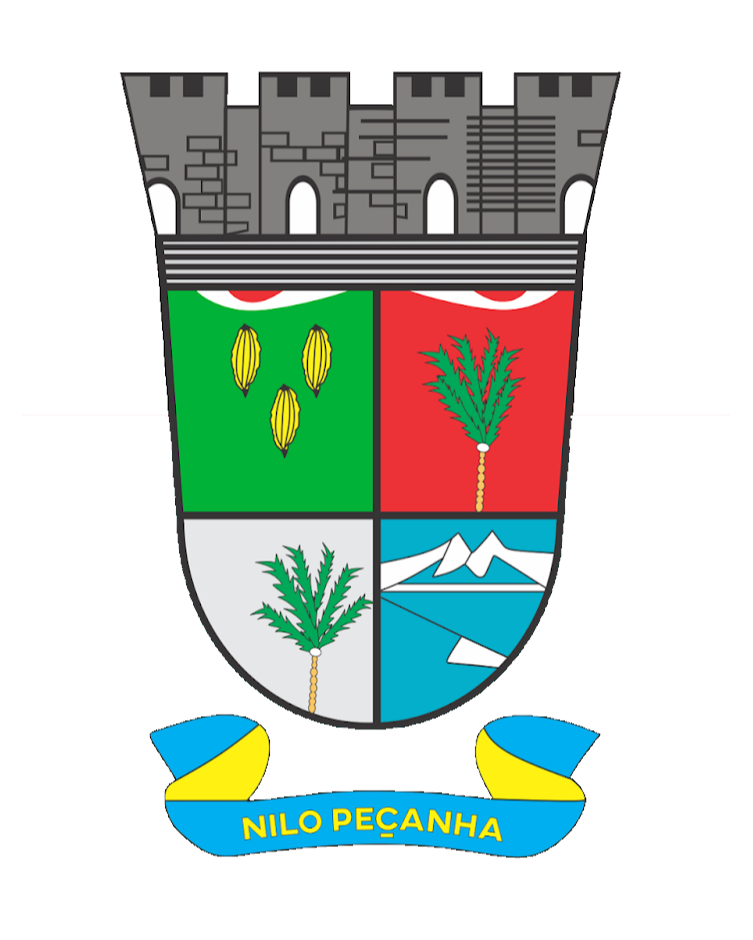
- Flag Coat of arms
- Interactive map of Nilo Peçanha
- Country: Brazil
- Region: Nordeste
- State: Bahia

Population (2020)
  - Total: 14,079
- Time zone: UTC -3

Nilo Peçanha is a municipality in the state of Bahia in the North-East region of Brazil.

The municipality contains part of the 230,296-hectare (569,070-acre) Caminhos Ecológicos da Boa Esperança Environmental Protection Area, created in 2003.

== See also ==
- List of municipalities in Bahia
