= Pureza, Rio Grande do Norte =

Municipality in Rio Grande do Norte, Brazil

Coordinates: 5°28′01″S 35°33′21″W

- Municipality
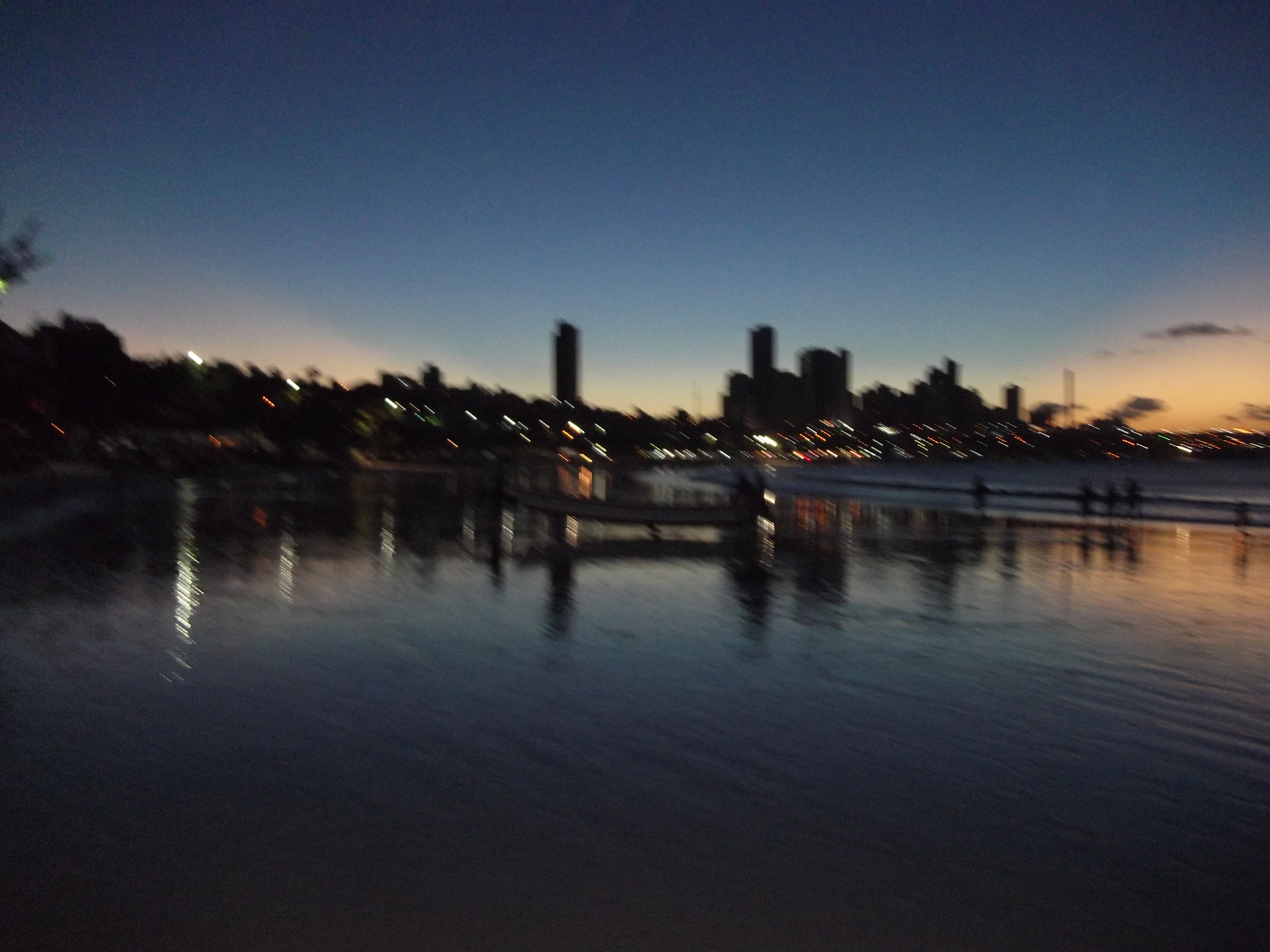
- City center of Pureza

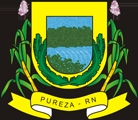
- Flag Coat of arms

- Country: Brazil
- Region: Nordeste
- State: Rio Grande do Norte
- Mesoregion: Leste Potiguar
- Established: 1963

Population (2020)
  - Total: 9,724
- Time zone: UTC−3 (BRT)

Pureza is a municipality in the state of Rio Grande do Norte in the Northeast region of Brazil. The place means "pure" in Portuguese hence its pure lake located in the area, and it is depicted in the municipal seal.

The municipality was founded in April 5, 1963 from a portion of the municipality of Touros.

Six municipalities borders Pureza, three of them are Touros to the north, Rio do Fogo to the east and João Câmara to the west.

== See also ==
- List of municipalities in Rio Grande do Norte
