= Calcanhar Lighthouse =

Lighthouse in Brazil

Calcanhar Lighthouse Touros Lighthouse
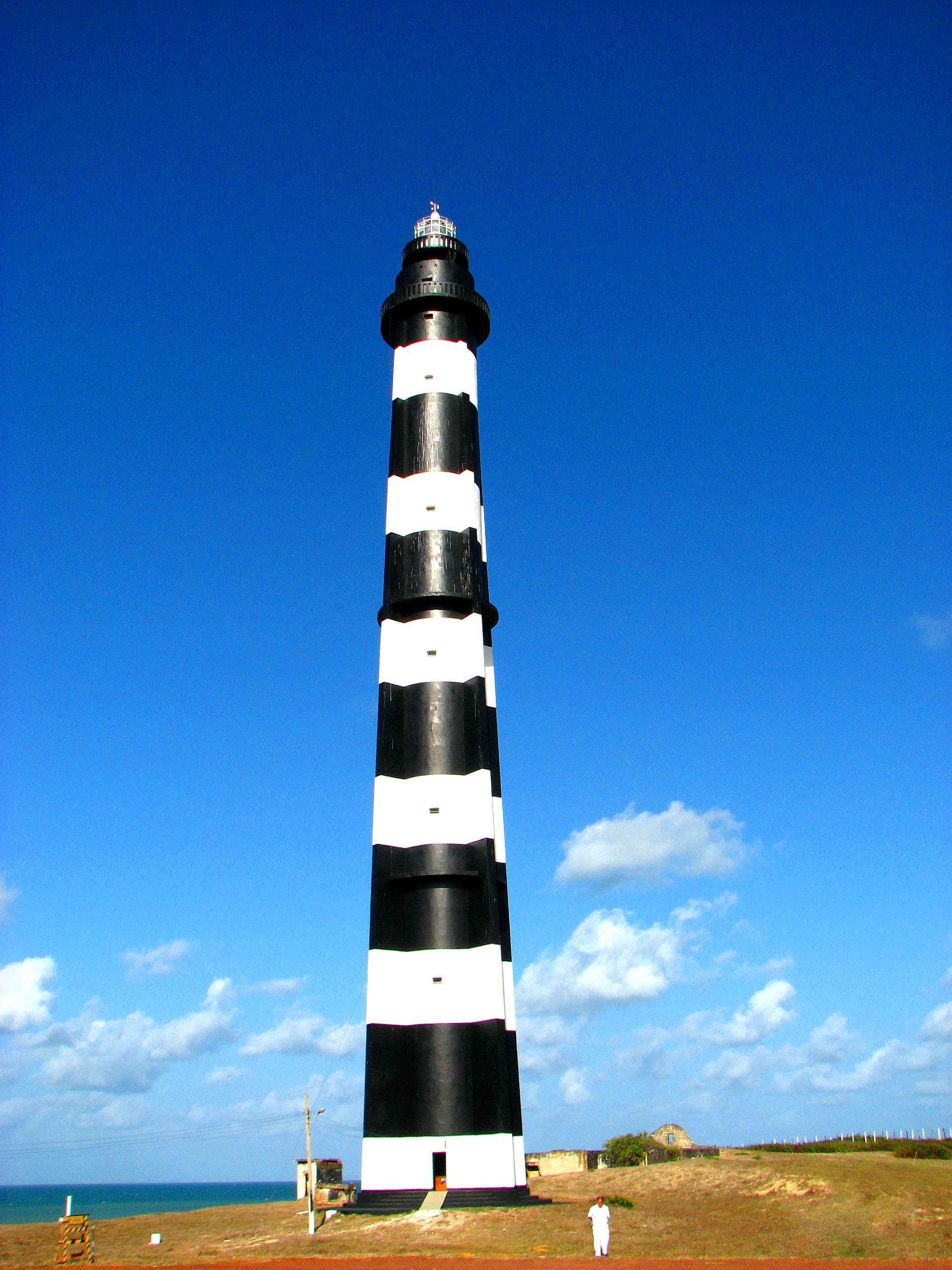
- Calcanhar Lighthouse, 2008
- Location: Touros; Rio Grande do Norte; Brazil
- Coordinates: 5°9′40.06″S 35°29′11.34″W

Tower
- Constructed: 1912 (first); 1937 (second)
- Foundation: concrete bas
- Construction: concrete tower (current) cast iron tower (first and second)
- Height: 62 metres (203 ft) (current); 50 metres (160 ft) (first); 52 metres (171 ft) (second)
- Shape: tapered cylindrical tower strengthened by four vertical ribs and lantern
- Markings: tower with black and white horizontal bands

Light
- First lit: 1943 (current)
- Focal height: 74 metres (243 ft)
- Range: 38 nautical miles (70 km; 44 mi)
- Characteristic: Fl W 10s.

Calcanhar Lighthouse (Portuguese: Farol do Calcanhar), also known as Touros Lighthouse and formerly named Olhos D'Agua, is an active lighthouse in Touros, Rio Grande do Norte, Brazil. At a height of 203 feet (62 m) it is the nineteenth tallest "traditional lighthouse" in the world, as well as the tallest in Brazil, and one of the tallest concrete lighthouses in the world.

== Location ==
The lighthouse is strategically placed on the beach of the Ponta de Calcanhar, near Touros, where the Brazilian coast forms a right angle, known as "Esquina do Brasil" (Corner of Brazil) or "Esquina do Continente" (Corner of the continent), near the northern end of the great curve of the Cape of São Roque, the northeastern shoulder of South America. It alerts ships to a coral reef located about 7 kilometres (4.3 mi) offshore. A spiral staircase of 277 steps leads to an observation platform; a 21-step ladder leads to the light.

The site also includes several one-story lighthouse keeper's houses and the light station has a resident keeper. The site is open, and the tower is open to the public daily 9 am to 11 am.

== See also ==
- List of tallest lighthouses in the world
- List of lighthouses in Brazil
