= Wenceslau Guimarães Ecological Station =

Ecological research station in Brazil

- Estação Ecológica de Wenceslau Guimarães
- IUCN category Ia (strict nature reserve)
- Location within Brazil
- Nearest city: Wenceslau Guimarães, Bahia
- Coordinates: 13.601127°S 39.730321°W
- Area: 2,418 hectares (5,980 acres)
- Designation: Ecological station
- Created: 21 February 1997
- Administrator: Secretaria de Meio Ambiente e Recursos Hídricos, BA

The Wenceslau Guimarães Ecological Station (Portuguese: Estação Ecológica de Wenceslau Guimarães) is an ecological station in the state of Bahia, Brazil.

== Location ==
The Wenceslau Guimarães Ecological Station (ESEC) is in the municipality of Wenceslau Guimarães, Bahia. It has an area of 2,418 hectares (5,980 acres). The 230,296 hectares (569,070 acres) Caminhos Ecológicos da Boa Esperança Environmental Protection Area, created in 2003, serves as a buffer zone. The ESEC is in the Rio das Almas sub-basin of the Recôncavo Sul basin. It has Atlantic Forest vegetation. Endangered mammals include southern tamandua (Tamandua tetradactyla), sloth, quaiti and the black-tufted marmoset (Callithrix penicillata). The rare white-necked hawk (Buteogallus lacernulatus) is found in the ESEC. It is threatened by deforestation, poaching and squatters.

== History ==
The Wenceslau Guimarães Forest Reserve was created by state decree 23.842 of 29 November 1973, with an area of about 12,000 hectares (30,000 acres). The area was redefined in 1977. The Wenceslau Guimarães Ecological Station was created by state governor decree 6.228 of 21 February 1997. It was created due to the great biological diversity of the Wenceslau Guimarães Forest Reserve, the endemic and endangered species, the need to protect the sources of the Das Almas River and the fact that the area is part of the core zone of the Atlantic Forest Biosphere Reserve. The management plan was issued in 1997. On 19 April 2000 the boundaries of the ecological station were expanded to cover an area of 2,418.19 hectares (5,975.5 acres). The ESEC became part of the Central Atlantic Forest Ecological Corridor, created in 2002.

== Sources ==
- Antas, Paulo de Tarso Zuquim (1997), Plano de Manejo Estação Ecológica Estadual de Wenceslau Guimarães (in Portuguese)
- APA Caminhos Ecológicos da Boa Esperança (in Portuguese), INEMA, 20 September 2011
- ESEC de Wenceslau Guimarães (in Portuguese), ISA: Instituto Socioambiental
- Lamas, Ivana Reis; Crepaldi, Maria Otávia; Mesquita, Carlos Alberto Bernardo (2015), Uma Rede no Corredor (PDF) (in Portuguese), Conservação Internacional (CI-Brasil), ISBN 978-85-98830-28-5
