= Taperoá, Bahia =

Coordinates: 13°32′S 39°05′W

Taperoá
- Municipality
- Municipality of Taperoá
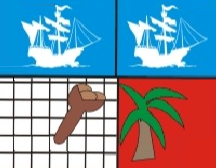
- Flag
- Nickname: Princesa do sertão
- Localization of the city
- Country: Brazil
- Region: Northeast
- State: Bahia

Government
  - Mayor: Toinho do Banco (PT)

Area
  - Total: 454.081 km^{2} (175.322 sq mi)
- Elevation: 286 m (938 ft)

Population (2020)
  - Total: 21,253
  - Density: 45.64/km^{2} (118.2/sq mi)
- Time zone: UTC−3 (BRT)
- Postal Code: 44000-000
- Area code: +55 75
- HDI (2010): 0.566 – medium

Taperoá is a municipality in Bahia, Brazil.

The municipality contains part of the 230,296-hectare (569,070-acre) Caminhos Ecológicos da Boa Esperança Environmental Protection Area, created in 2003.
