= Jiquiriçá =

Municipality of Bahia, Brazil

Coordinates: 13°15′25″S 39°34′19″W

- Municipality
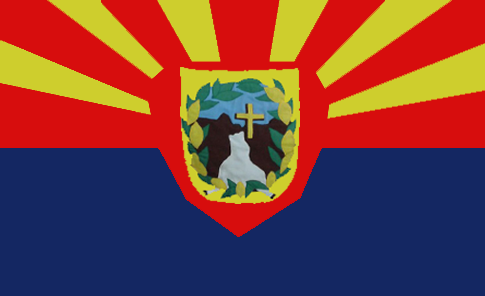
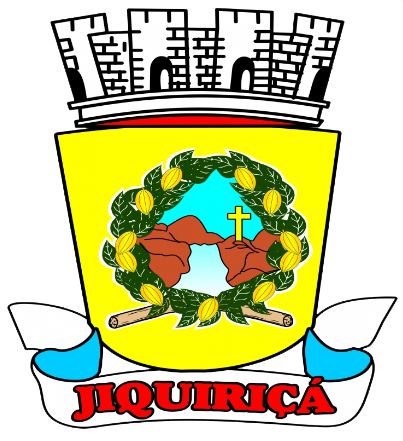
- Flag Coat of arms
- Interactive map of Jiquiriçá
- Country: Brazil
- Region: Nordeste
- State: Bahia

Population (2022)
  - Total: 13,629
- Time zone: UTC−3 (BRT)

Jiquiriçá is a municipality in the state of Bahia in the North-East region of Brazil.

The municipality contains part of the 230,296 hectares (569,070 acres) Caminhos Ecológicos da Boa Esperança Environmental Protection Area, created in 2003.

== See also ==
- List of municipalities in Bahia
