= Itaquara =

Municipality of Bahia, Brazil

Coordinates: 13°27′03″S 39°56′27″W

- Municipality
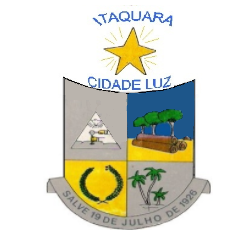
- Coat of arms
- Interactive map of Itaquara
- Country: Brazil
- Region: Nordeste
- State: Bahia

Population (2020)
  - Total: 8,347
- Time zone: UTC−3 (BRT)

Itaquara is a municipality in the state of Bahia in the North-East region of Brazil.

== See also ==
- List of municipalities in Bahia
