= Ubaíra =

Coordinates: 13°16′S 39°39′W

- Municipality
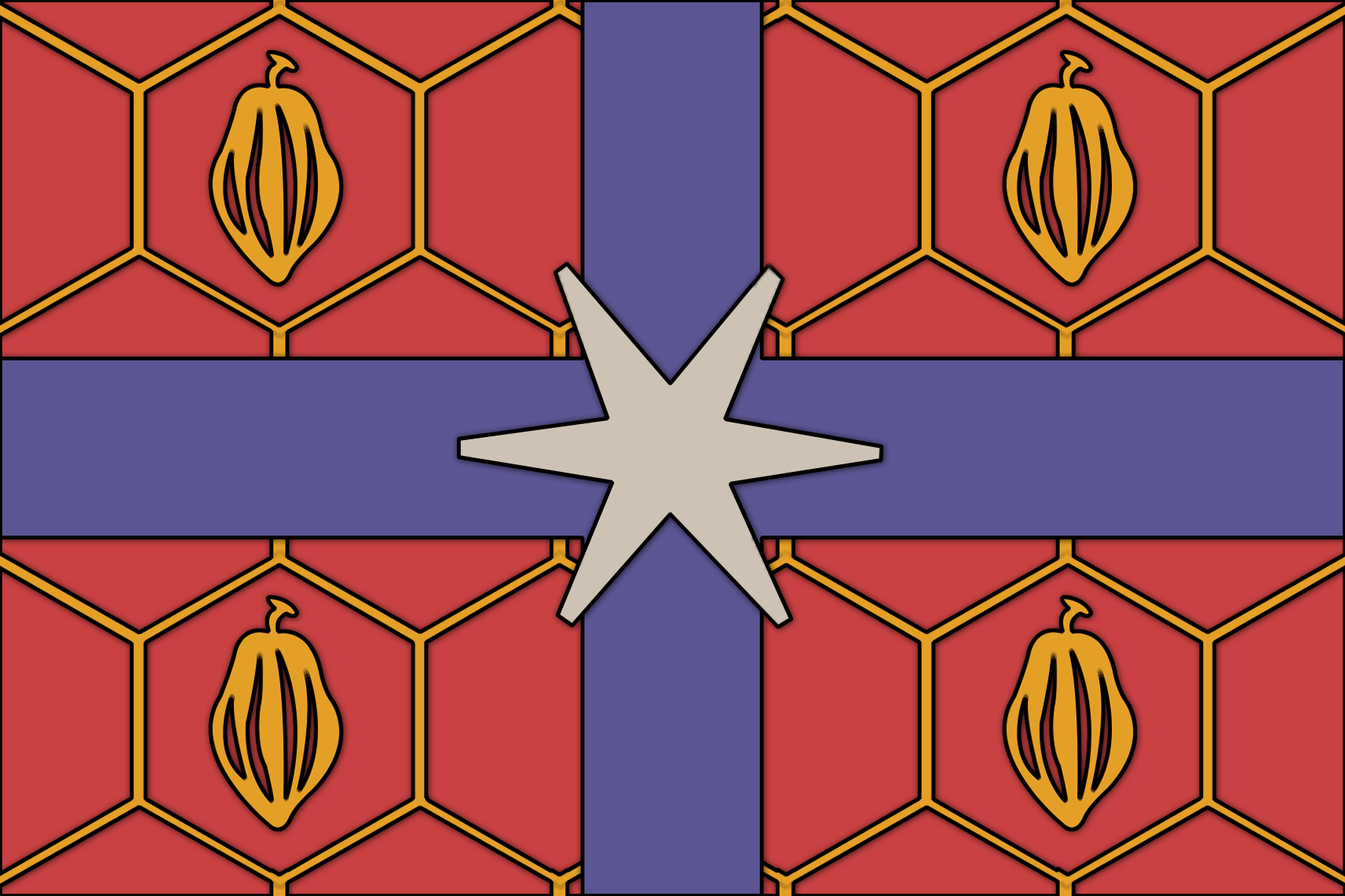
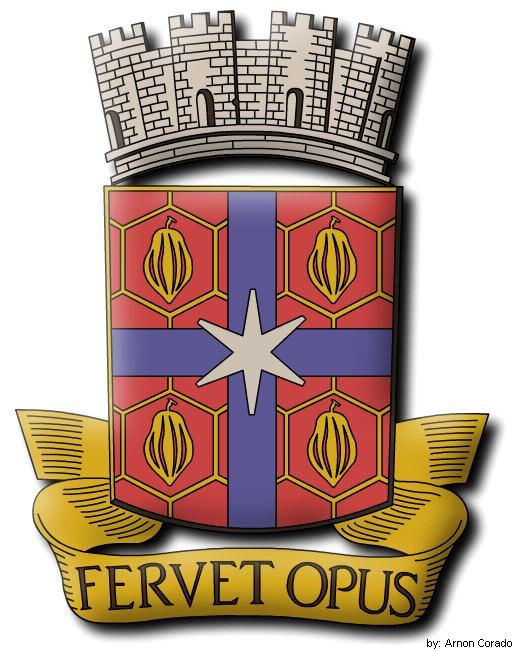
- Flag Coat of arms

- Location in Bahia
- Country: Brazil
- Region: Nordeste
- State: Bahia

Population (2020)
  - Total: 19,877
- Time zone: UTC−3 (BRT)

Ubaíra is a municipality in the state of Bahia in the North-East region of Brazil.

The municipality contains part of the 230,296 hectares (569,070 acres) Caminhos Ecológicos da Boa Esperança Environmental Protection Area, created in 2003.

== See also ==
- List of municipalities in Bahia
