= Wenceslau Guimarães =

Coordinates: 13°41′13″S 39°28′44″W

- Municipality
- Location in Bahia
- Country: Brazil
- Region: Nordeste
- State: Bahia

Population (2020)
  - Total: 20,978
- Time zone: UTC−3 (BRT)

Wenceslau Guimarães is a municipality in the state of Bahia in the North-East region of Brazil.

The municipality contains the 2,418 hectares (5,980 acres) Wenceslau Guimarães Ecological Station, created in 1995. It also contains part of the 230,296 hectares (569,070 acres) Caminhos Ecológicos da Boa Esperança Environmental Protection Area, created in 2003, which serves as a buffer zone for the ecological station.

== See also ==
- List of municipalities in Bahia
