= Parazinho =

Municipality in Rio Grande do Norte, Brazil

Coordinates: 5.22278°S 35.8378°W

- Municipality
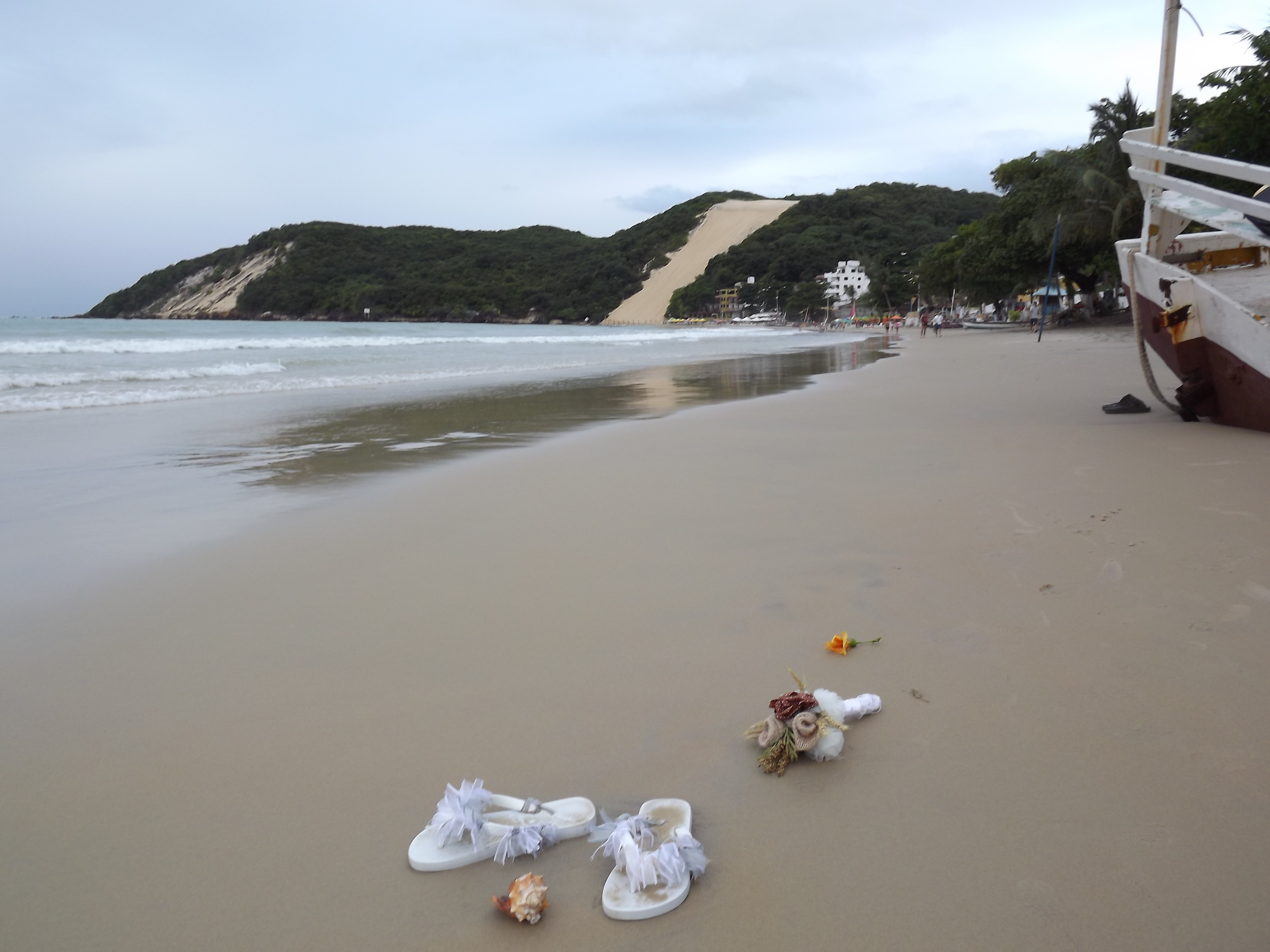
- Parazinho and its beach and the surrounding mountains

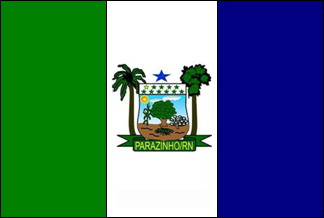
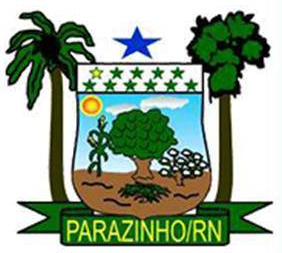
- Flag Coat of arms

- Location of Parazinho
- Country: Brazil
- Region: Nordeste
- State: Rio Grande do Norte
- Mesoregion: Agreste Potiguar

Population (2020)
  - Total: 5,272
- Time zone: UTC−3 (BRT)

Parazinho is a municipality in the state of Rio Grande do Norte in the Northeast region of Brazil.

Its seal has a ground of a countryside with a tree, on top is a blue star, surrounding are two different type of palm trees founded in the area, on the bottom is the municipality name in a green ribbon with yellow letters. Its flag colors are green, white and blue with the seal in the middle.

== See also ==
- List of municipalities in Rio Grande do Norte
