= Rio do Fogo =

Municipality in Rio Grande do Norte, Brazil

Coordinates: 5°16′S 35°23′W

- Municipality
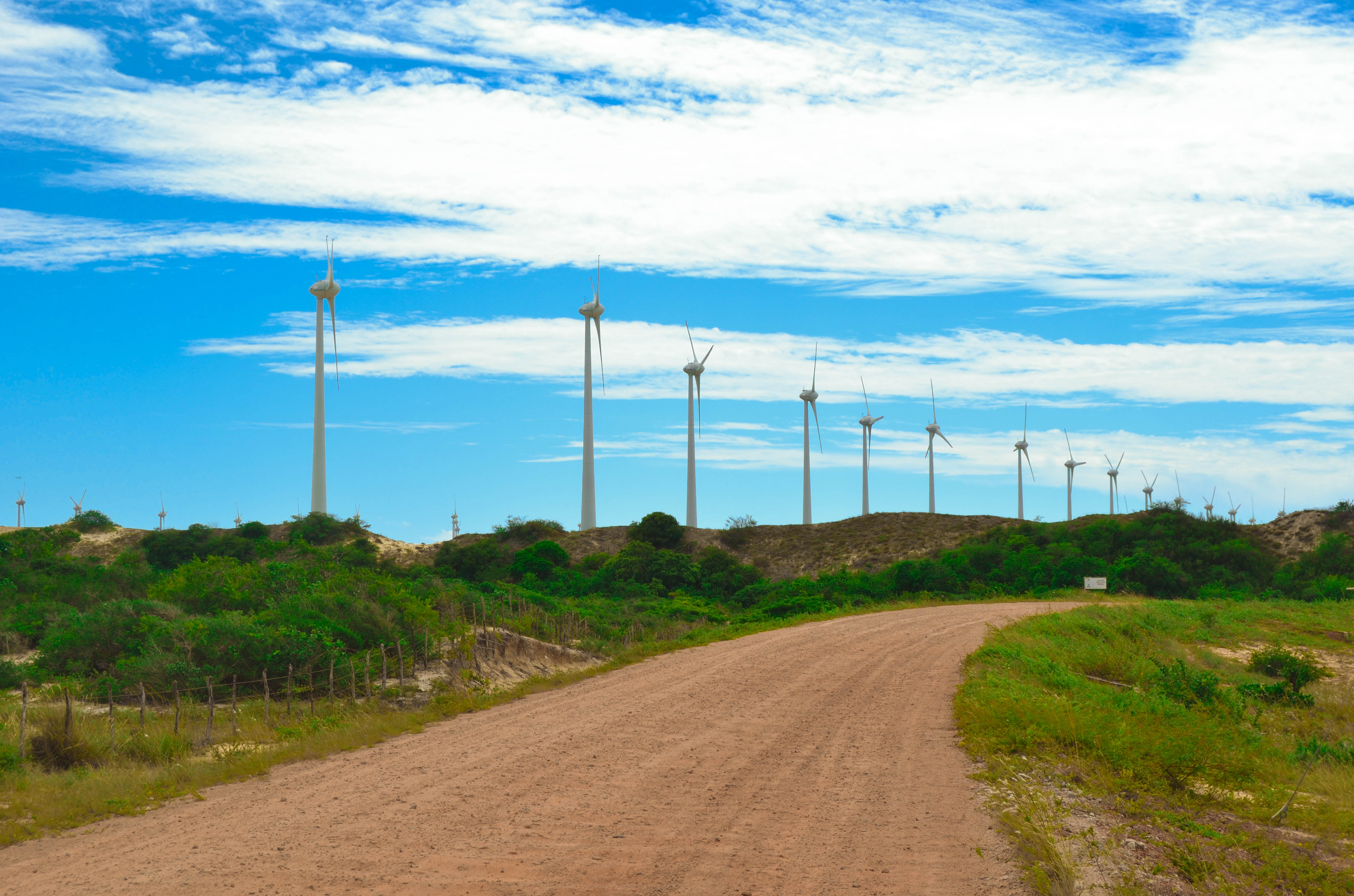
- Parque Eólico de Rio do Fogo

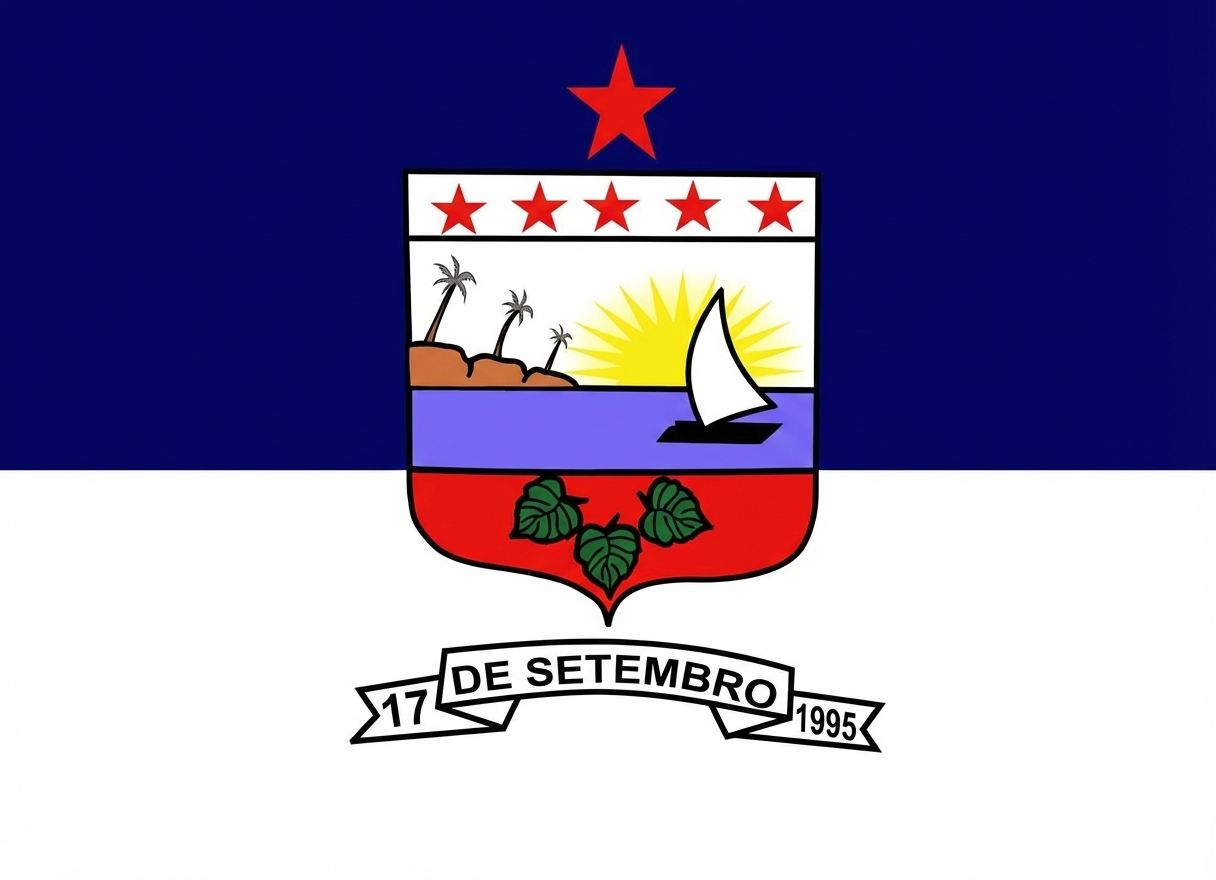
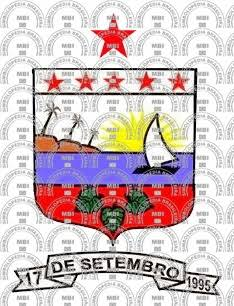
- Flag Coat of arms

- Country: Brazil
- Region: Nordeste
- State: Rio Grande do Norte
- Mesoregion: Leste Potiguar

Population (2020)
  - Total: 10,905
- Time zone: UTC−3 (BRT)

Rio do Fogo is a municipality in the state of Rio Grande do Norte in the Northeast region of Brazil. The municipality is named after a river which means the "River of Fire".

Another river is Rio Guaxinim (Tupi originated name) located nearby and a beach called Pititinga. Along the coast is a wind farm that energy to parts of the state.

Rio do Fogo is connected with the BR-101, the longest highway in Brazil.

== See also ==
- List of municipalities in Rio Grande do Norte
