= BR-101 (Brazil highway) =

Highway in Brazil

BR-101 Transcoastal Highway
- Translitorânea
- Governador Mário Covas Highway
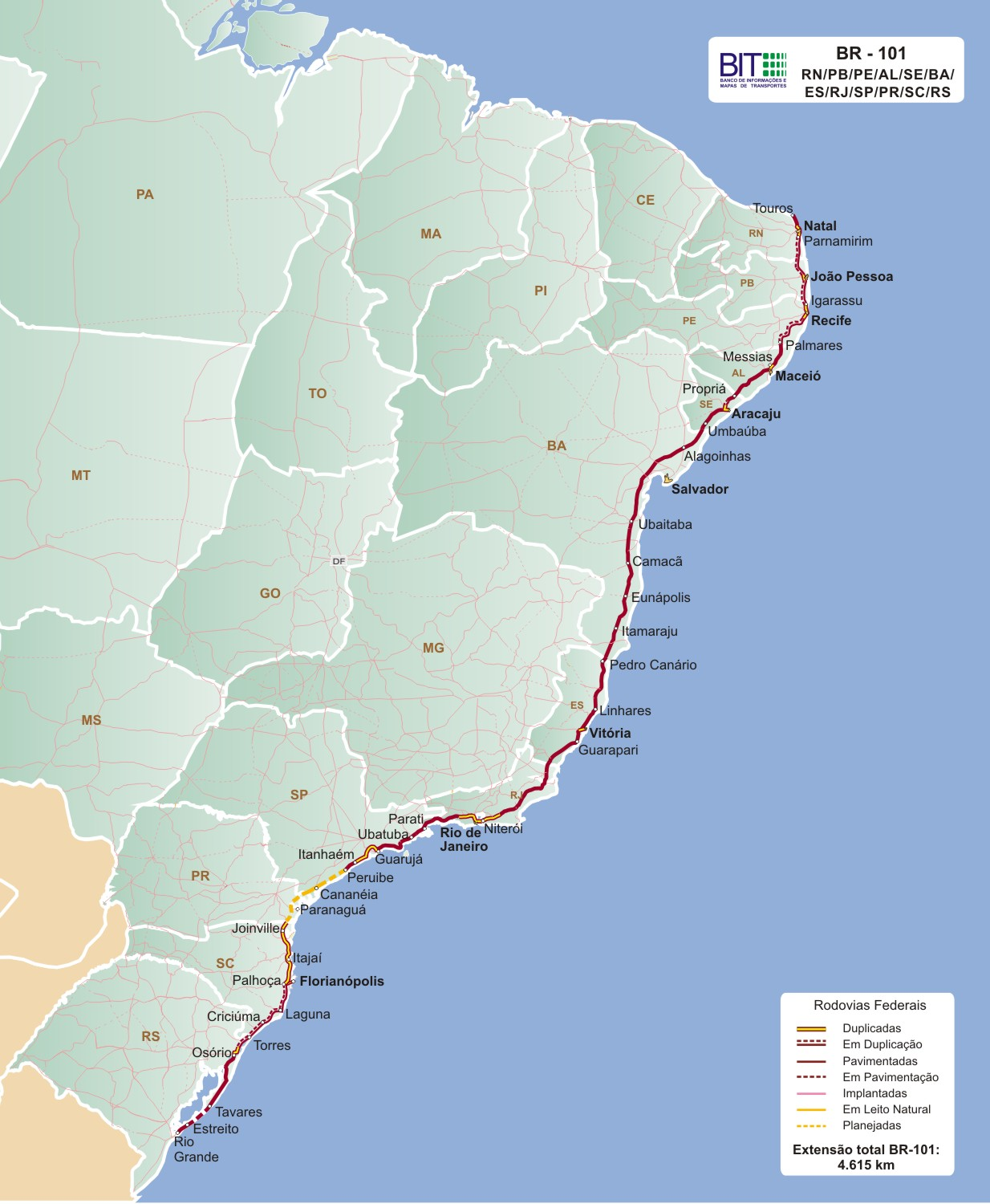

Route information
- Length: 4,658.00 mi (7,496.32 km)
- Existed: 1957 (Curitiba – Florianópolis segment); 1950s (Florianópolis – Torres segment); 1960s/70s (Torres – Parnamirim segment); 1980s (Rodovia Rio-Santos); 1950s/1960s (Rio de Janeiro – Salvador segment); 1988 (divided highway on the Curitiba – Florianópolis segment); 2009 (divided highway on the Florianópolis – Osório segment); 1958 (Salvador – Touros segment); 2002 (divided highway on the Salvador – Touros segment)–present

Major junctions
- North end: RN-023 in Touros, Rio Grande do Norte
- BR-226 in Natal, RN; BR-230 in João Pessoa, PB; BR-232 in Recife, PE; BR-235 in Aracaju, SE; BR-324 in Feira de Santana, BA; BR 415 in Itabuna, BA; BR-367 in Eunápolis, BA; BR-381 in São Mateus, ES; BR-116 in Rio de Janeiro, RJ; BR-465 in Rio de Janeiro, RJ; BR-459 in Paraty, RJ; BR-050 in Santos, SP; BR-280 in Joinville, SC; BR-470 in Navegantes, SC; BR-282 in São José, SC; BR-453 in Torres, RS; BR-290 in Osório, RS.
- South end: São José do Norte, Rio Grande do Sul

Location
- Country: Brazil

Highway system
- Highways in Brazil; Federal

BR-101 (also called Translitorânea (transcoastal), officially named Rodovia Governador Mário Covas. and nicknamed Briói in some regions) is a longitudinal highway of Brazil. It is the second longest in the country with a length of nearly 4,800 km (3,000 mi), and it is considered one of the most important highways in the country, along with BR-116.

It crosses 12 Brazilian states: Rio Grande do Norte, Paraíba, Pernambuco, Alagoas, Sergipe, Bahia, Espírito Santo, Rio de Janeiro, São Paulo, Paraná, Santa Catarina and Rio Grande do Sul. It also connects more state capitals than any other "rodovia" (highway) in the country. In total, 12 capitals are directly connected by BR-101.

Its northern terminus is located in the city of Touros-RN and its southern terminus is in São José do Norte-RS.

It follows virtually the entire east coast of Brazil from Rio Grande do Norte to Rio Grande do Sul. The highway has not been built between two stretches, namely between Peruíbe (SP) and Iguape (SP), and between Cananéia (SP) and Garuva (SC).

Between Curitiba and Garuva (SC), the highway was replaced by the BR 101 / BR 376 and was widened by the Paraná government, not by the federal government.

The northern section between Curitiba and the border with São Paulo was not built to preserve an area of the Atlantic Forest.

The Rio-Niterói Bridge is part of the BR-101.

== Duplication ==
In the southern region of the country, the 312 km section between Curitiba and Florianópolis was completely converted into a dual carriageway around the year 2000. In 2005, the duplication of the 350 km section between Palhoça – SC and Osório – RS began. The 88.5 kilometers of the Rio Grande do Sul section were delivered only in February 2011; in the southern state of Santa Catarina, the delay was even longer: in 2018, 14.5 km (10 km in Laguna and 2 km in Tubarão) had yet to double. In 2019, the section was completed and opened to traffic.

In the Southeast Region of the country, in 2009, the duplication of 26 km between the Santa Cruz district, in the West Zone of the city of Rio de Janeiro, to the Itacuruçá district, in the municipality of Mangaratiba, was opened to the public, a section located in the State of Rio de Janeiro. Janeiro, near the capital of Rio de Janeiro. The urban section that comprises Avenida Brasil is 58 km long and is completely duplicated and is administered by the municipality of Rio de Janeiro and ends near the beginning of the Río – Niterói Bridge. The bridge is about 13 km long. Between the capital of Rio de Janeiro and the city of Campos, the stretch between Niterói and Rio Bonito has already doubled since the 1980s. The 176.6 km stretch between Rio Bonito and Campos dos Goytacazes was awarded to the company Arteris in 2008, for 30 years. The duplication work started in 2011, and in 2018 the company had already duplicated 126.3 km.

In the Northeast Region of the country, the BR-101 section in the northeast, between Natal and Salvador, has been duplicated since 2005. Not yet completed, it's expected to be finished in 2021. About 70 km that cut the Recife Metropolitan Region already were duplicated before 2005. In the 688 km section connecting the states of Rio Grande do Norte, Paraíba, Pernambuco and Alagoas (section between Natal-RN, João Pessoa-PB, Recife-PE, Maceió-AL and the AL-SE border), the road is almost completely duplicated. In February 2019, there was a 59 km section in Alagoas, between São Miguel and Rio Largo, whose inauguration was scheduled for the second half of 2020. A 10 km section in the indigenous reserve in Joaquim Gomes-AL is pending release for construction. In Sergipe, the works are progressing at a slow pace, with no anticipation of completion. In the Sergipe state, the 67 km stretch between Aracaju and Estância has been completed and the link between Maruim and Propriá is almost interrupted, and the Brazilian army is only carrying out work. At the end of 2018, duplicate 18 km were delivered in this section. The section of Bahia, with no forecast of completion, will be 165.4 kilometers from Feira de Santana to the border with the state of Sergipe. Another part will double from Eunápolis to the border with Espírito Santo.

== Gallery ==
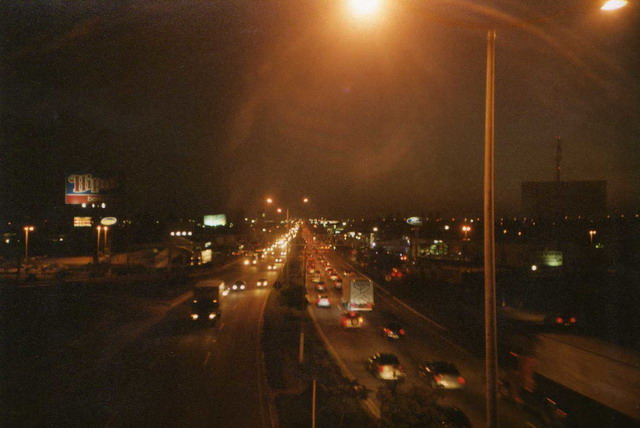
BR-101 in Natal, Rio Grande do Norte

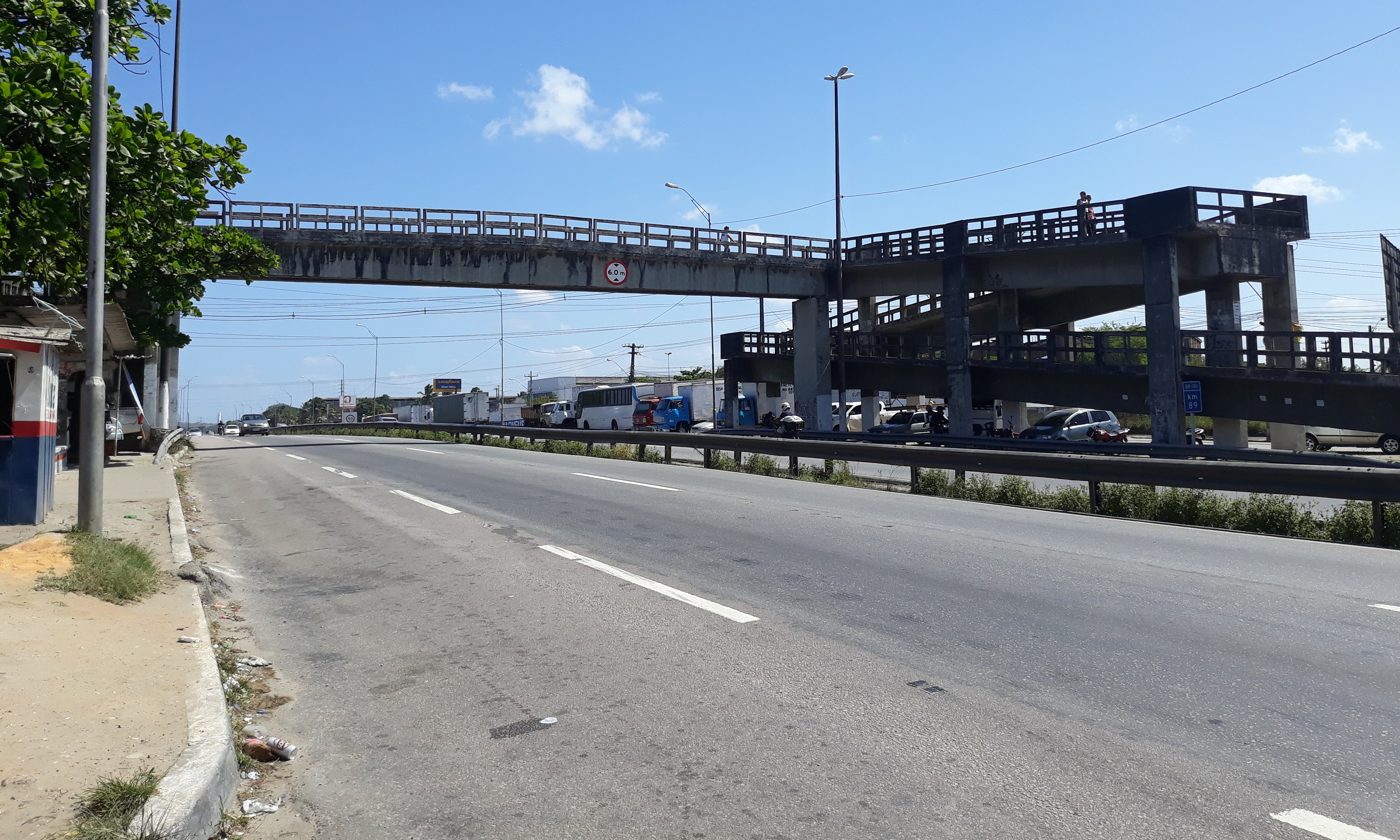
BR-101 in João Pessoa, Paraíba

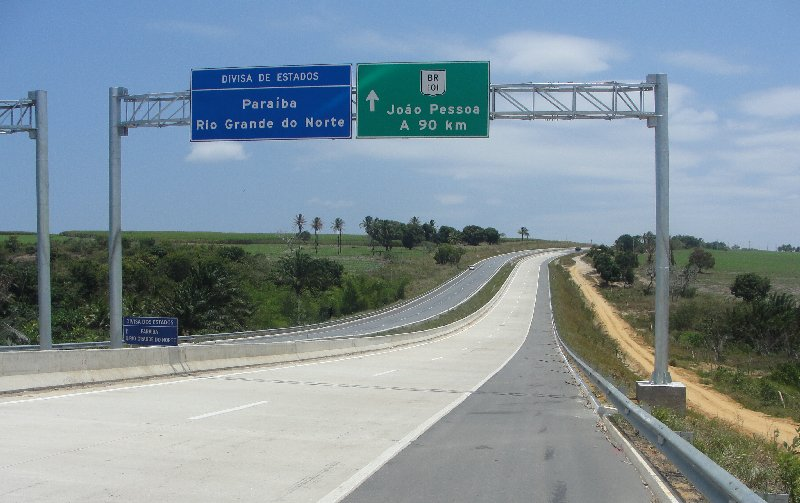
Section of the BR-101 on the border between the states of Paraíba and Rio Grande do Norte.

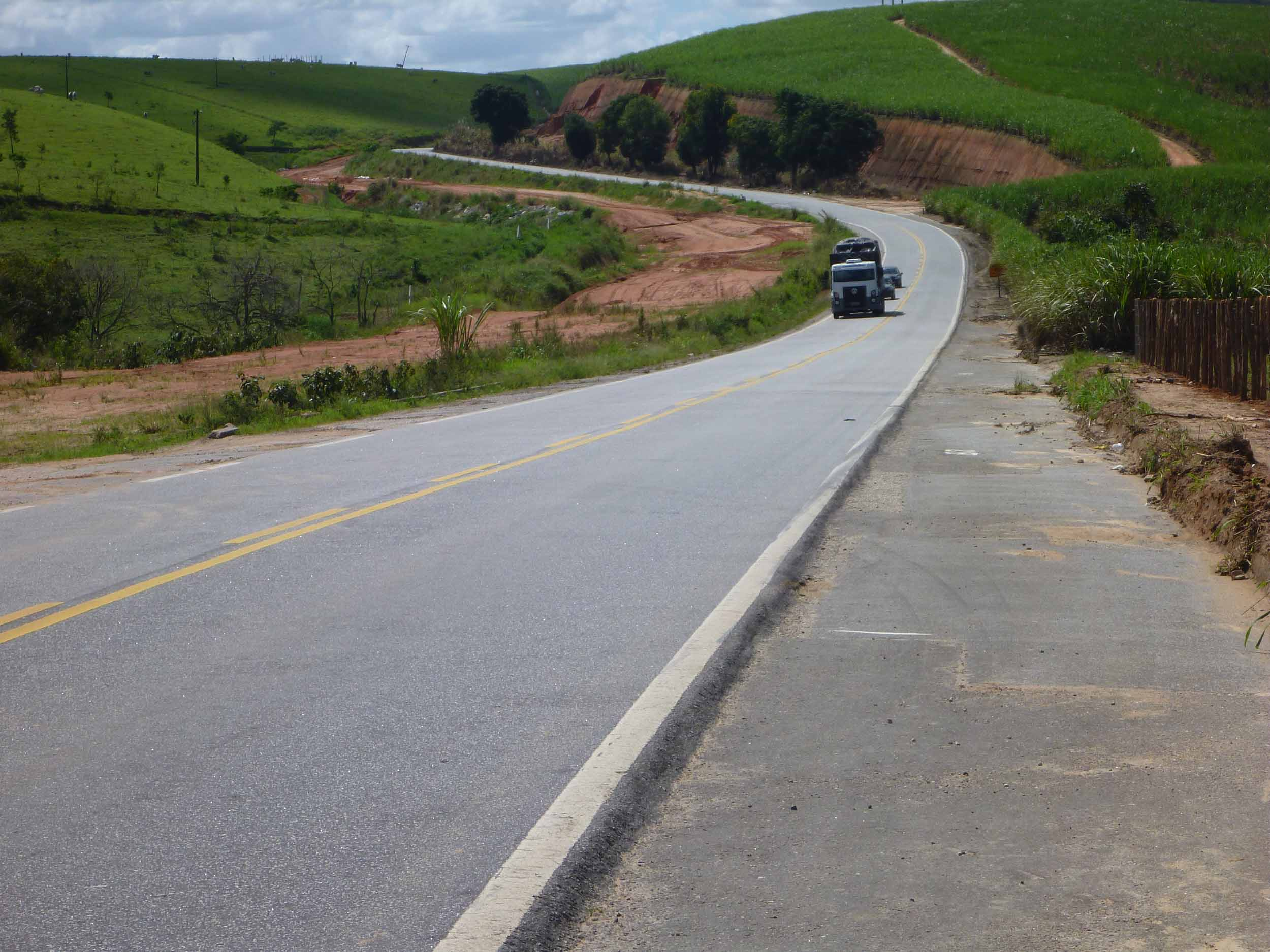
BR-101 in Alagoas, 2012, before the duplication

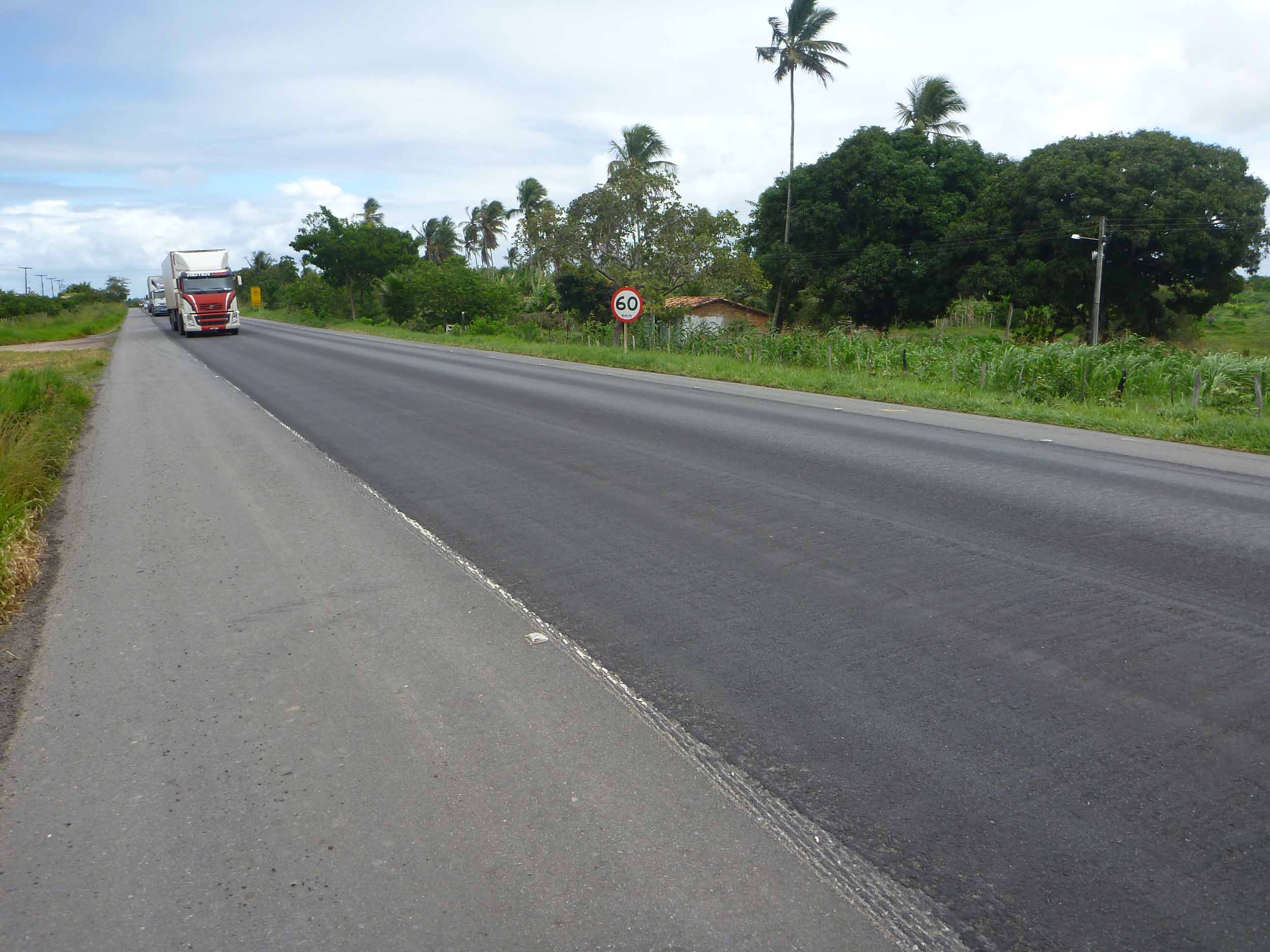
BR-101 in Sergipe, 2012, before the duplication

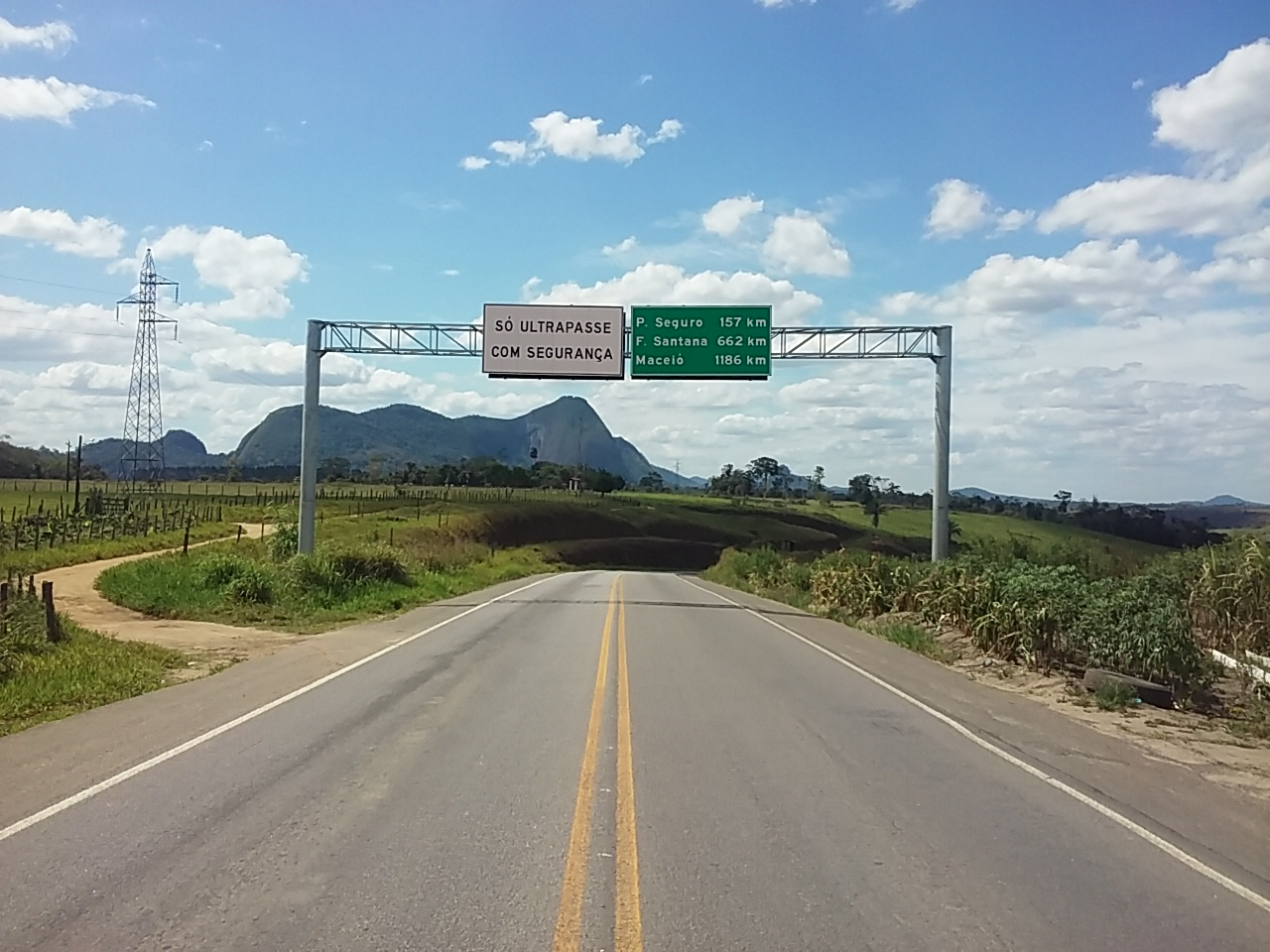
BR-101 in Itamaraju, Bahia

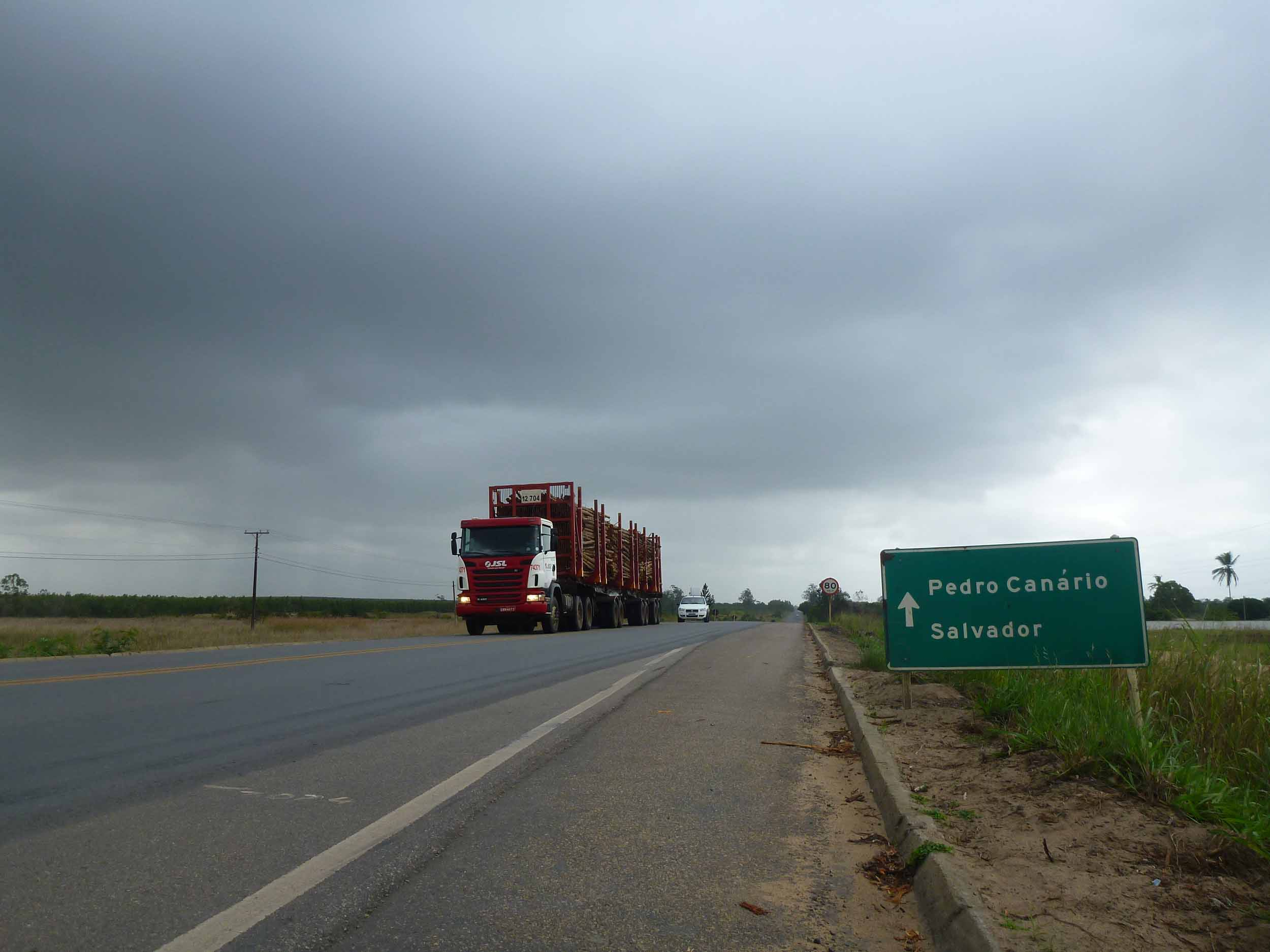
BR-101 in São Mateus, Espírito Santo, 2012

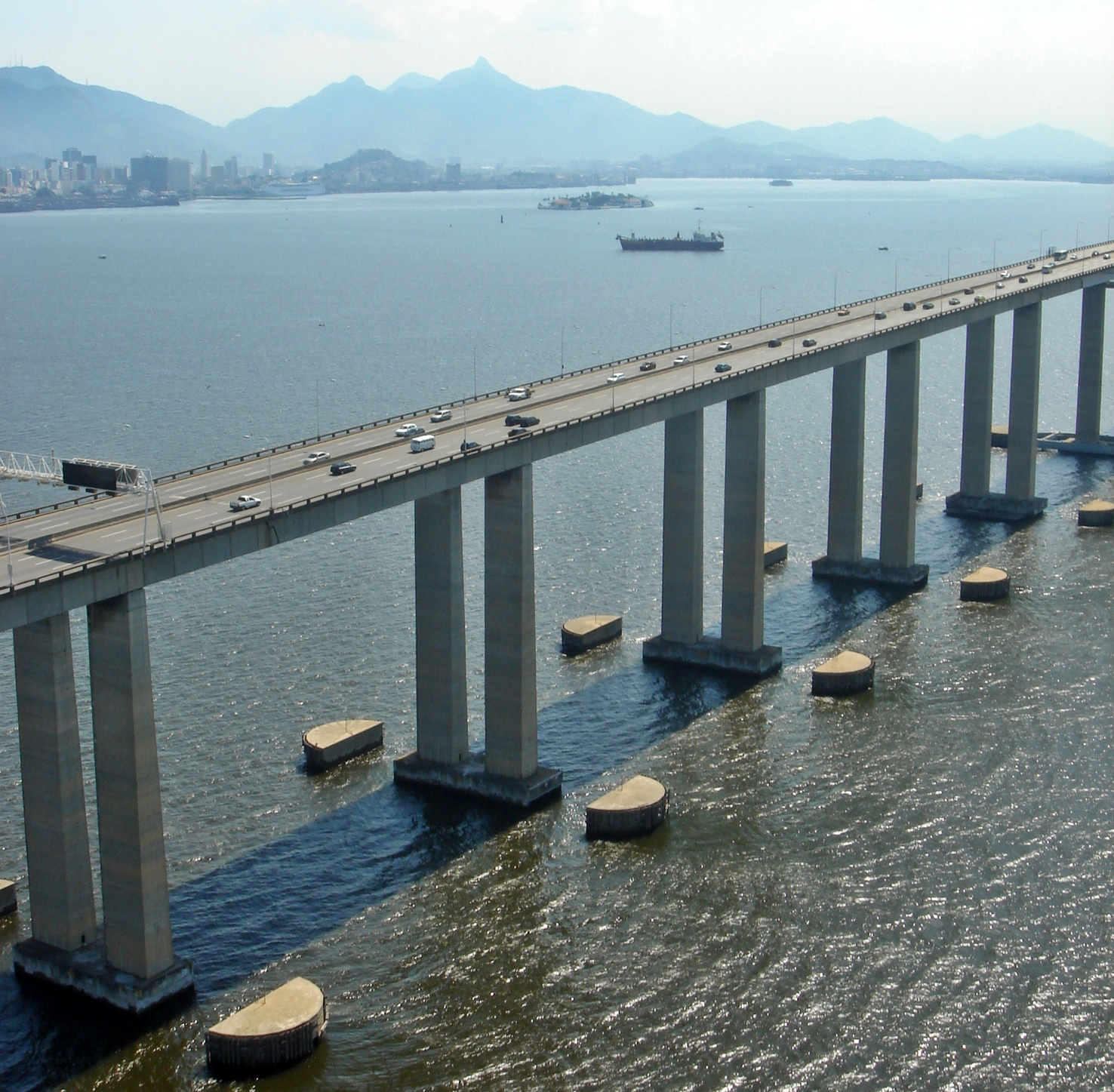
The Rio-Niterói Bridge, a section of the BR-101 over Guanabara Bay between the cities of Rio de Janeiro and Niterói.

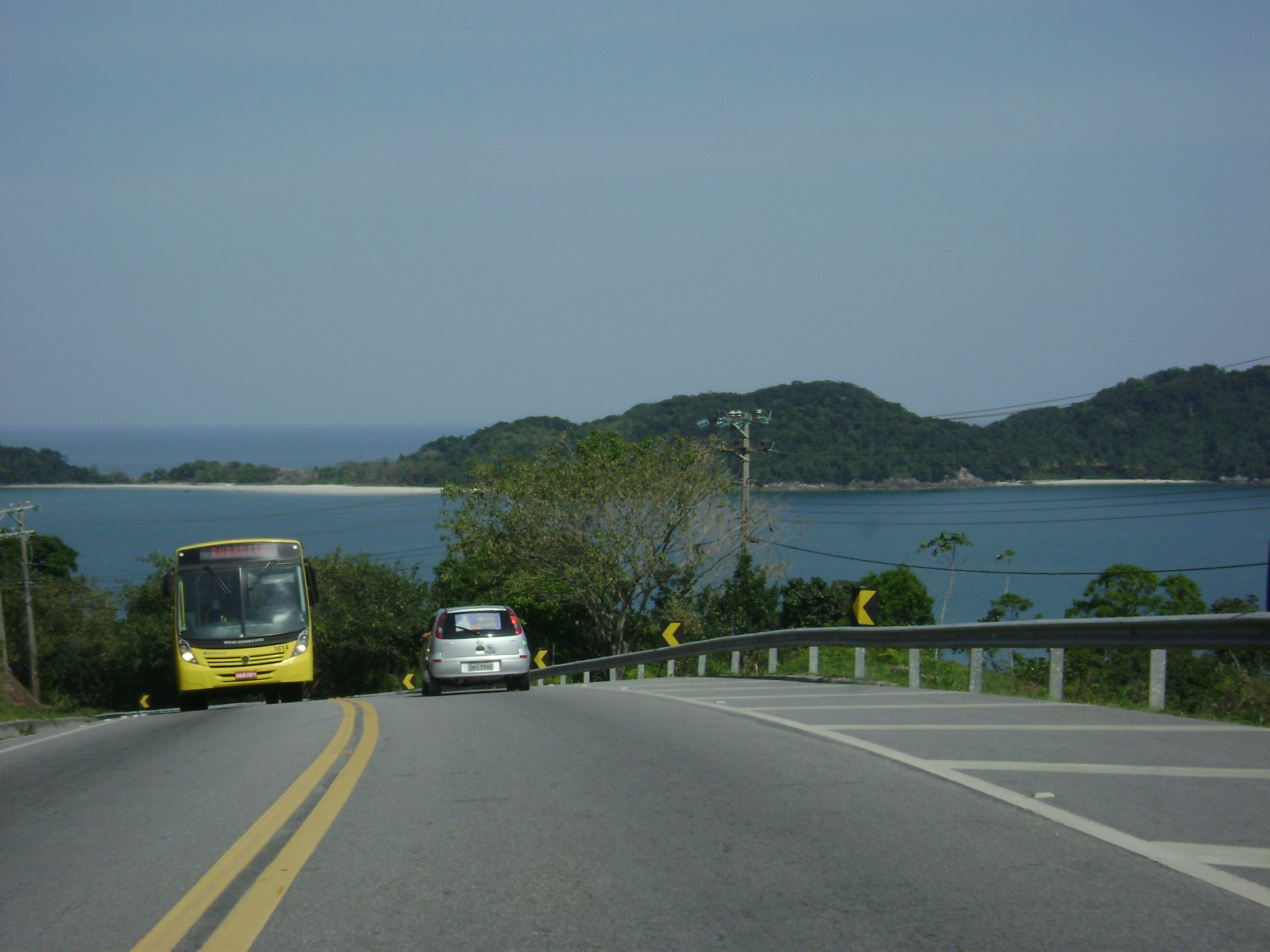
Section of the Rio-Santos highway between Juqueí and Praia Preta, in São Sebastião, São Paulo

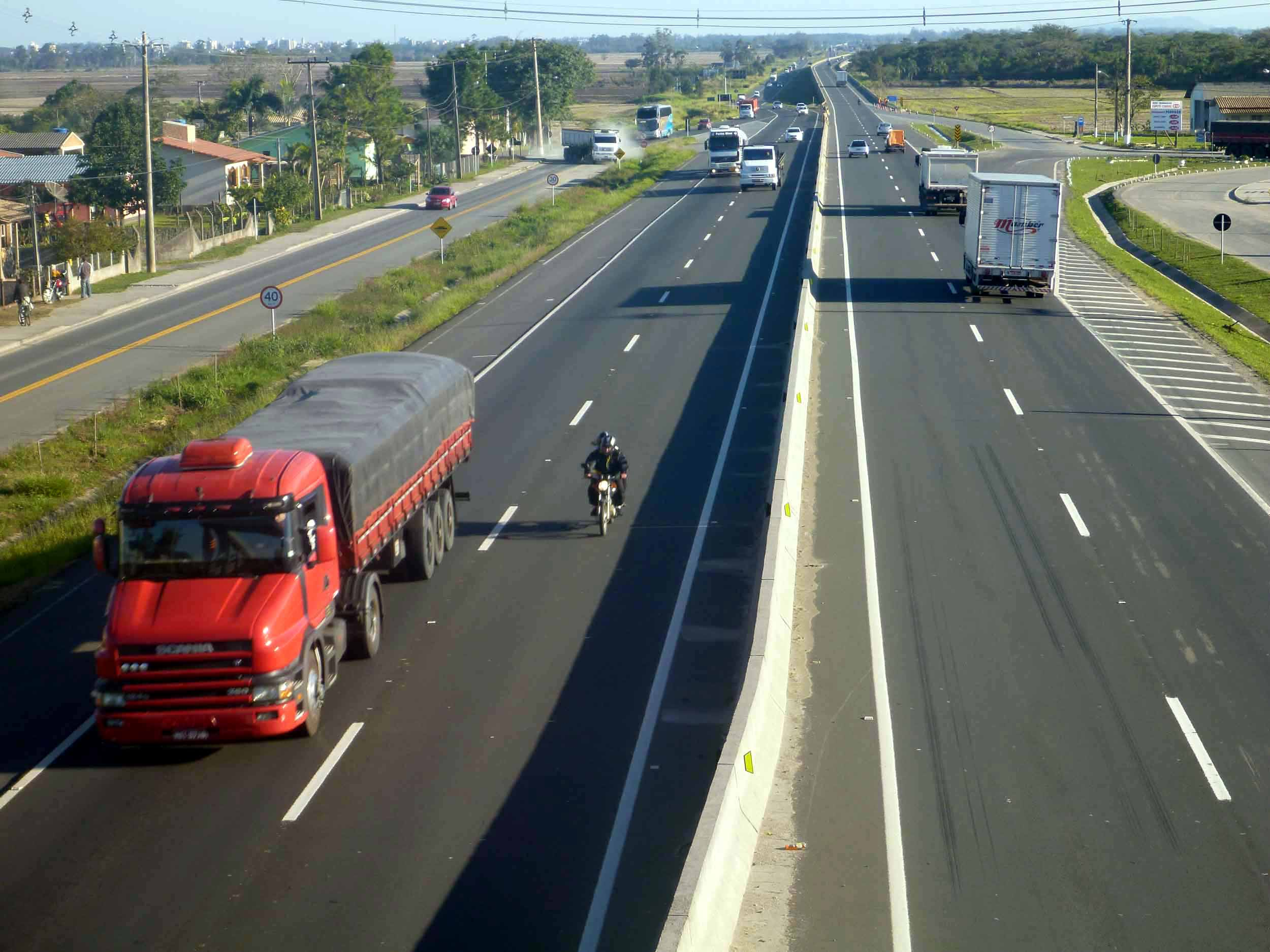
BR-101 in Santa Catarina

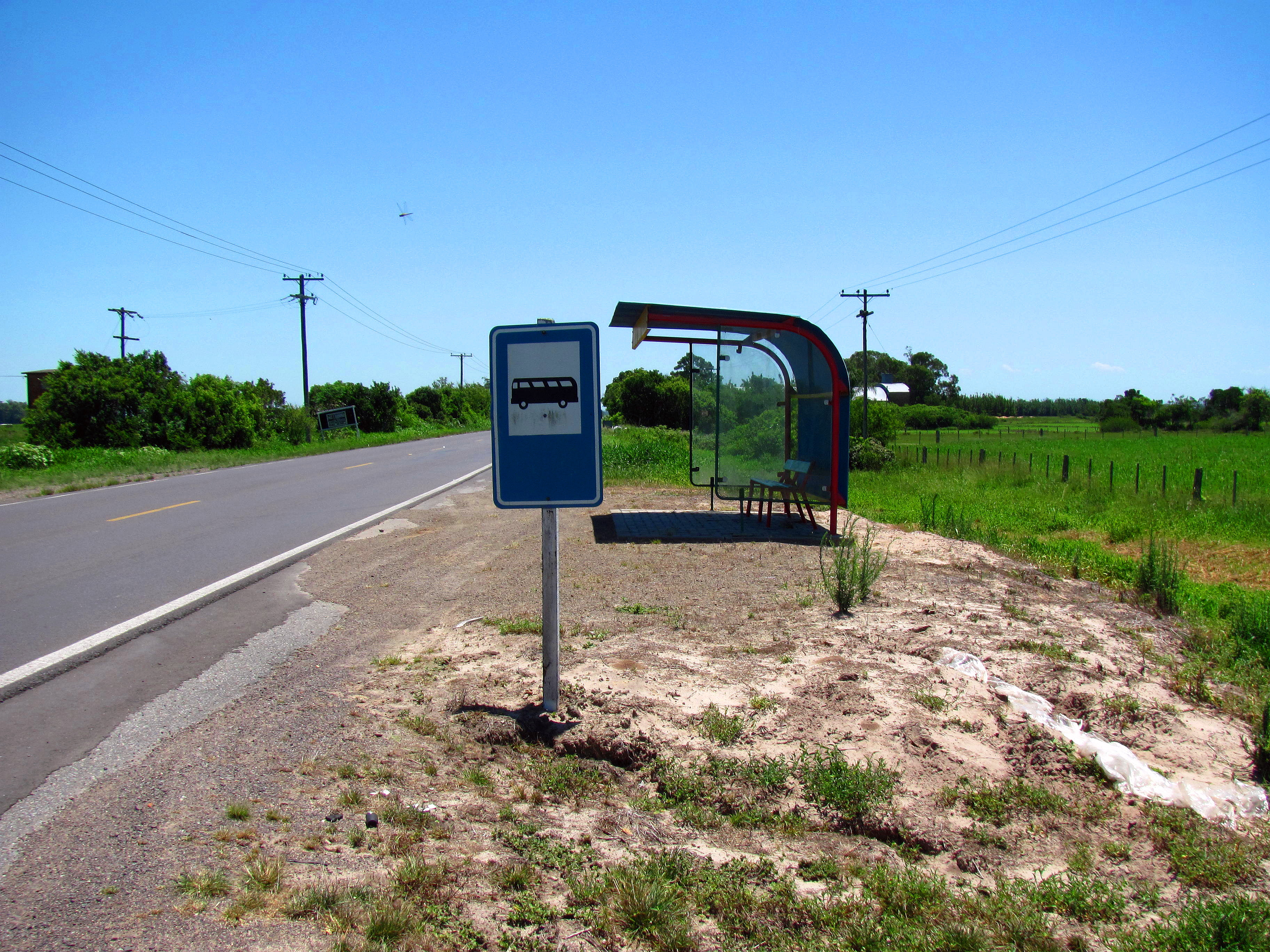
BR-101 in Capivari do Sul, Rio Grande do Sul

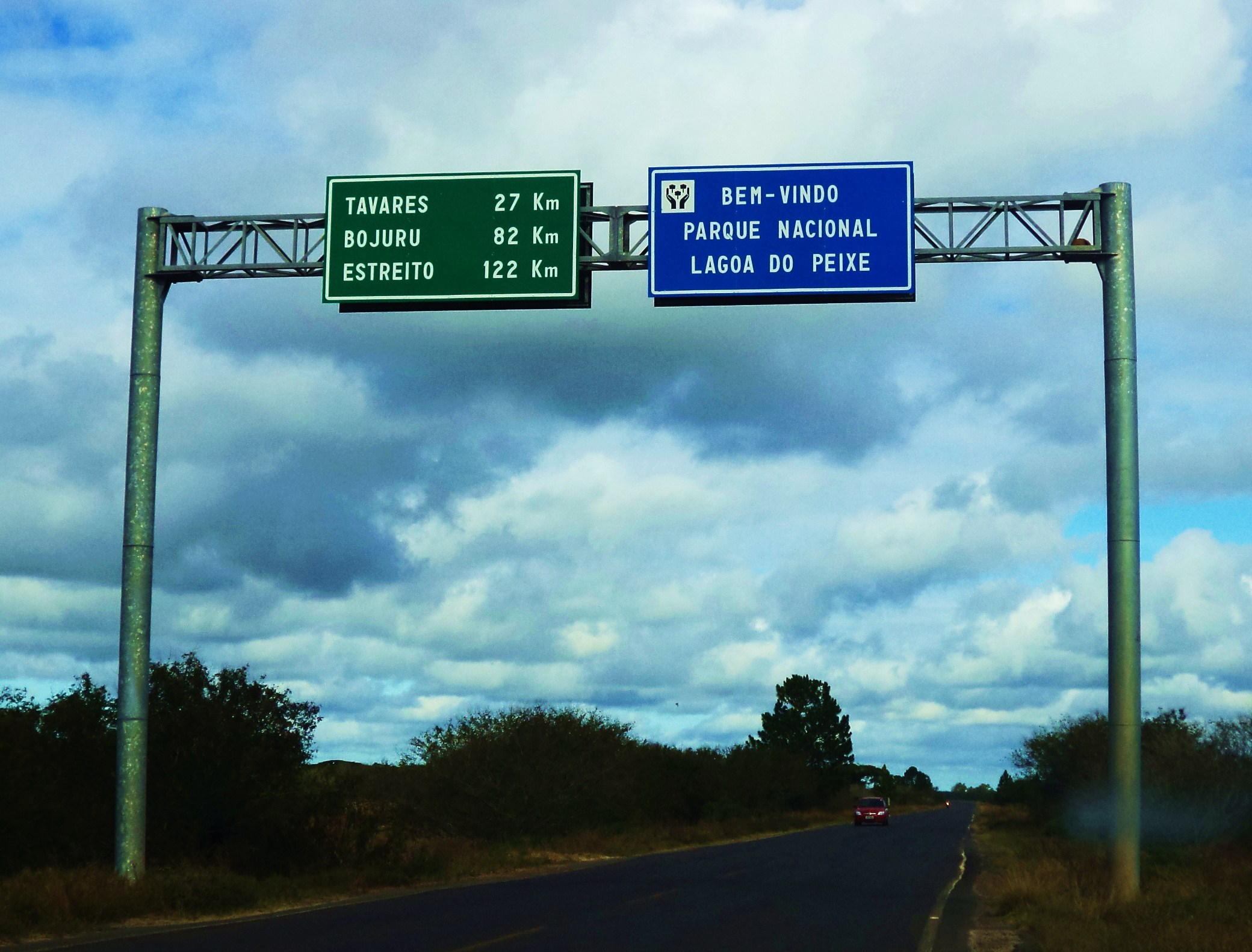
BR-101 in Lagoa do Peixe National Park, Rio Grande do Sul

== See also ==
- Transport in Brazil
