= São Gonçalo do Amarante, Rio Grande do Norte =

Municipality in Rio Grande do Norte, Brazil

São Gonçalo do Amarante
- Municipality
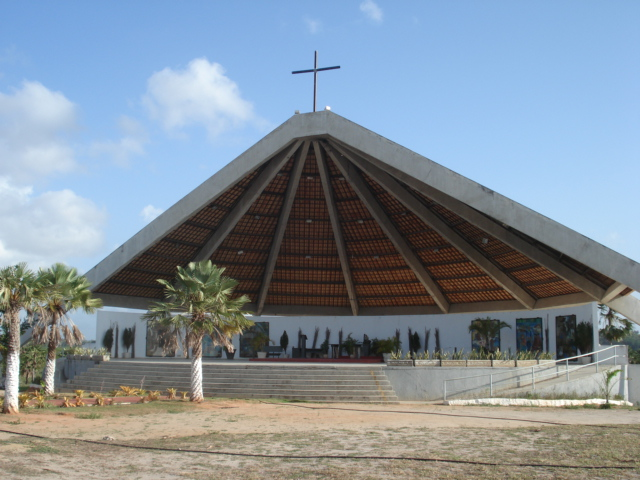
- A chapel in São Gonçalo do Amarante

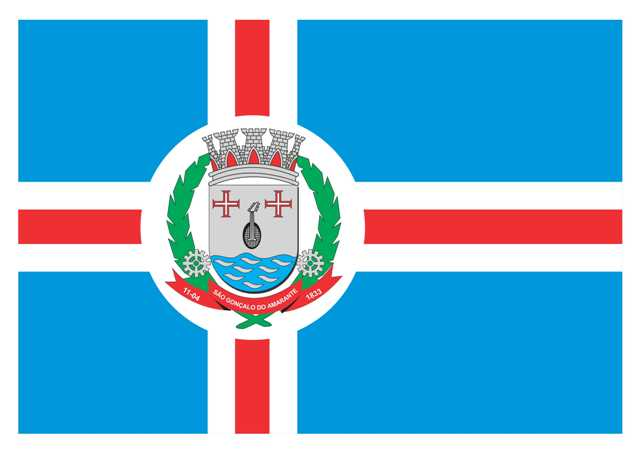
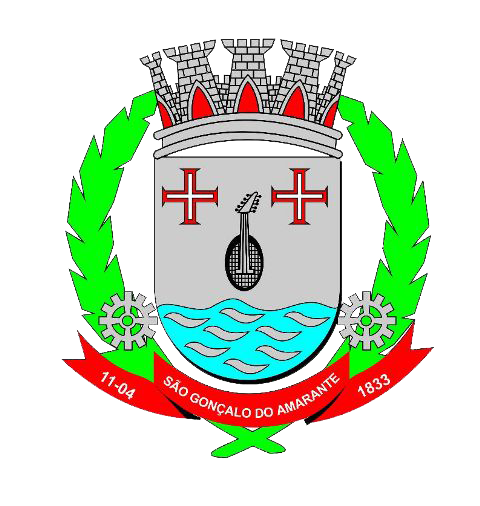
- Flag Coat of arms
- Nicknames: São Gonçalo; Land of Martyrs; Aerotropolis
- Anthem
- Location in the state of Rio Grande do Norte

- Location in Brazil
- Coordinates: 05°47′34″S 35°19′44″W
- Country: Brazil
- Region: Nordeste
- State: Rio Grande do Norte
- Metropolitan Region: Natal
- Adjacent municipalities: Natal (east); Macaíba (south); Ceará-Mirim and Extremoz (north); Ielmo Marinho (west)
- Distance to capital: 18 kilometres (11 mi)
- Founded: 1710
- Emancipated: 11 December 1958

Government
  - Mayor: Jaime Calado Pereira dos Santos (PSD)
  - Term ends: 2028
  - Councilors: 17

Area
  - Total: 249.800 km^{2} (96.448 sq mi)
  - Rank: RN: 73rd
- Elevation: 42 m (138 ft)

Population (2025)
  - Total: 124,495
  - Rank: RN: 4th
  - Density: 498.379/km^{2} (1,290.79/sq mi)
- Demonym: Gonçalense or são-gonçalense
- Time zone: UTC−3 (BRT)
- Postal code (CEP): 59290-000 to 59299-999
- HDI (UNDP/2010): 0.661
- HDI rank: RN: 17th
- Gini (2020): 0.44
- GDP (IBGE/2021): R$1,905,023.47
- GDP per capita (IBGE/2021): R$18,157.09
- Climate: Tropical wet and dry (As)
- Website: saogoncalo.rn.gov.br

São Gonçalo do Amarante is a Brazilian municipality located in the Metropolitan Region of Natal, in the state of Rio Grande do Norte, in the Northeast Region of Brazil. It spans a territorial area of approximately 249.800 km^{2}. It is the fourth most populous municipality in the state, following Natal, Mossoró, and Parnamirim, with a population of 124,495 inhabitants in 2025.

The municipality is known for being the site of one of the most significant events in the history of Rio Grande do Norte and Brazilian Catholicism, when Dutch forces massacred eighty individuals in an event known as the Uruaçu Massacre, which occurred in 1645. In 2017, these martyrs were canonized as saints in Saint Peter's Square, in a ceremony presided over by Pope Francis.

Throughout its history, São Gonçalo do Amarante lost its autonomy several times until achieving definitive emancipation in 1958, when it separated from Macaíba. Since 2014, it has been home to the Governador Aluízio Alves International Airport, a Brazilian airport complex, which was the first Brazilian airport to be privatized and serves the cargo and passenger transport demands of the Natal Metropolitan Region.

== History ==
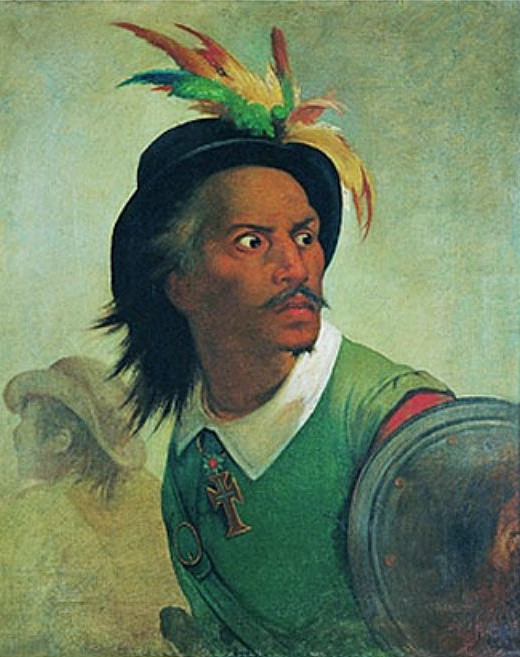
Portrait of Felipe Camarão, by Victor Meirelles de Lima.

The territory that now constitutes São Gonçalo do Amarante was originally inhabited by the Potiguara Indians, among whom Poti, known as Filipe Camarão, stood out, originating from a community in Extremoz.

The municipality's name derives from Gundisalvus of Amarante, a Portuguese ecclesiastic and the patron saint of the city of Amarante in Portugal. São Gonçalo do Amarante saw its first settlers in the 17th century, with the family of Estevão Machado de Miranda, who were soon massacred by the Dutch in the massacre of Cunhaú and Uruaçu in 1645. It was not until 1689 that expeditions from Pernambuco led to the repopulation of the area after the expulsion of the invaders.

In the 18th century, in 1710, near the Potengi Mill, Paschoal Gomes de Lima and Ambrósio Miguel Sirinhaém, both Portuguese natives, settled with their families along the banks of the eponymous river. After settling, they built their residences and constructed a small church dedicated to the saint Gundisalvus of Amarante. The municipality's name comes from the stone statue of the saint that was placed on the altar.

On 11 April 1833, during the administration of Manoel Lobo de Miranda Henrique, the municipality of São Gonçalo do Amarante was established. In 1856, under the governance of Antônio Bernardes de Passos, the municipality was struck by a cholera epidemic that claimed 171 lives. In 1868, through a provincial law sanctioned by Governor Gustavo Augusto de Sá, the municipality lost its autonomy and was annexed to the municipality of Natal, the provincial capital. Six years later, the village was detached and restored to municipal status.

However, in 1879, the population of São Gonçalo do Amarante suffered a setback when the municipal government seat was transferred to the village of Macaíba, previously known as Cuité. In 1890, shortly after the proclamation of the republic, José Inácio Fernandes Barros, the vice-president of Rio Grande do Norte, elevated the village of São Gonçalo do Amarante, then part of Macaíba, to municipal status.

With State Decree-Law No. 268 of 1943, São Gonçalo do Amarante once again lost its political autonomy, reverting to a district of Macaíba under the name Felipe Camarão, and losing part of its territory, which formed the current municipality of São Paulo do Potengi. It was only with the enactment of State Law No. 2324 on 11 December 1958, that the district definitively gained political emancipation, and its name was changed from Felipe Camarão back to São Gonçalo do Amarante.

== Geography ==
According to the division established by the Brazilian Institute of Geography and Statistics (IBGE) in 2017, São Gonçalo do Amarante belongs to the intermediate and immediate geographic regions of Natal. Previously, under the division into microregions and mesoregions, it was part of the Macaíba microregion, which was included in the East Potiguar mesoregion.

Part of the Metropolitan Region of Natal (RMN) and the Polo Costa das Dunas, São Gonçalo do Amarante is located seventeen kilometers from the center of Natal, the state capital, with which it borders to the east. Its other boundaries are Ceará-Mirim and Extremoz to the north, Macaíba to the south, and Ielmo Marinho to the west. Its territorial area spans 249.8 km^{2} (96.4 sq mi) (0.473% of the state's surface), of which 31.986 km^{2} (12.350 sq mi) constitute the urban area (2019).

The municipality is predominantly flat, consisting of low-lying areas with yellow and/or red clay soils. Its formation includes coastal sediments near the floodplains of the Potengi River and the terraces of the Barreiras Group. Latosol is the dominant soil type, with smaller areas of quartz sand to the east and, to the southwest, planosol and red-yellow podzol (now classified as luvisol). Along the banks of the Potengi River, both alluvial and mangrove soils are found, covered by floodplain forests and mangroves, respectively, both part of the Atlantic Forest biome, which also includes subperennial and deciduous forests and coastal tablelands. However, 94% of the municipality's territory lies within the Caatinga biome, while the remaining 6% lies within the Atlantic Forest, creating an ecotone between the two biomes.

The predominant drainage basin covers 82.65% of the municipality's territory and is that of the Potengi River, with the remaining 17.35% in the Doce River basin. The main river crossing the municipality is the Potengi River, which originates in Cerro Corá and has a course of 176 kilometers, flowing into the Atlantic Ocean in Natal. Other significant rivers include Camaragibe and Prata. The local hydrography is also marked by the Bela Vista Lagoon and the Guajirus, Onça, Santo Antônio, Serrinha, and Tapará streams.

The climate is tropical wet and dry (Aw), with rainfall concentrated between March and July. According to data from the Rio Grande do Norte Agricultural Research Company (EMPARN), since 1992, the highest 24-hour rainfall recorded in São Gonçalo do Amarante was 206 millimetres (8.1 in) on 30 July 1998. Since October 2018, when EMPARN installed an automatic weather station in the city, the lowest temperature was recorded on 25 August 2020 (18.4 °C (65.1 °F)), and the highest on 12 January 2019 (35 °C (95 °F)).

Climate data for São Gonçalo do Amarante
Month	Jan	Feb	Mar	Apr	May	Jun	Jul	Aug	Sep	Oct	Nov	Dec	Year
Record high °F	95	93	94.5	91.9	90.0	91.0	89.8	88.9	90.5	92.1	93.6	93	95
Record low °F	67.1	70.3	71.2	70.9	70.5	68.5	65.8	65.1	66.6	66.7	70.0	67.6	65.1
Average precipitation inches	2.52	3.81	6.8	6.43	6.98	8.93	7.25	3.01	1.37	0.53	0.57	0.8	49.00
Record high °C	35	34	34.7	33.3	32.2	32.8	32.1	31.6	32.5	33.4	34.2	34	35
Record low °C	19.5	21.3	21.8	21.6	21.4	20.3	18.8	18.4	19.2	19.3	21.1	19.8	18.4
Average precipitation mm	64.1	96.8	172	163.3	177.3	226.8	184.1	76.5	34.7	13.5	14.6	21	1,244.7
Source: EMPARN (temperature records: 2018-10-19–present; precipitation averages: 1992–2020)

== Demography ==
Historical population
Year	Pop.	±%
1900	11,742	—
1920	17,231	+46.7%
1940	20,353	+18.1%
1960	16,785	−17.5%
1970	18,826	+12.2%
1980	30,797	+63.6%
1991	45,461	+47.6%
2000	69,435	+52.7%
2010	87,668	+26.3%
2022	115,838	+32.1%
Source: IBGE (1872–2022)

The population of São Gonçalo do Amarante grew by 32.1% between the 2010 and 2022 censuses, at a geometric growth rate of 2.32% per year, increasing from 87,668 people in 2010 to 115,838 people in 2022, with a population density of 463.72 inhabitants per square kilometre (1,201.0/sq mi). The average household size in the last census was 2.9 residents per household. With 51.44% of inhabitants being female and 48.56% male, the sex ratio was 94.4 (9,440 men per ten thousand women). In terms of race or ethnicity, 53% were mixed race, 34.06% white, 12.44% black, 0.35% indigenous, and 0.16% Asian. The median age of the population was 32 years, ranging from 30 years for whites and indigenous people to 37 for blacks.

According to the 2010 census, the last to release data on religion, 70.44% of inhabitants were Catholics, 20.2% evangelicals, and 7.84% had no religion, while other denominations accounted for 1.52%. Within the Catholic Church, the municipality belongs to the Archdiocese of Natal and has four parishes: São Gonçalo, Santo Antônio, São Lucas, and Santo Expedito. São Gonçalo do Amarante also is home to various Protestant or reformed denominations, with the Assemblies of God and the Universal Church of the Kingdom of God being the main ones.

The municipality's Human Development Index is considered to be medium, according to data from the United Nations Development Programme (UNDP). According to the 2010 report, released in 2013, its value was 0.661, ranking it 16th in the state and 2870th nationally. Considering only the longevity index, its value is 0.829, the income index is 0.619, and the education index is 0.564. In 2010, 78.75% of the population lived above the poverty line, 12.72% between the indigence and poverty lines, and 8.53% below the indigence line. In the same year, the richest 20% held 48.63% of the municipal income, while the poorest 20% held only 3.8%, with the Gini index, which measures social inequality, at 0.46.

== Politics ==
According to the organic law of São Gonçalo do Amarante, enacted on 3 April 1990, and amended subsequently, municipal administration is conducted by two independent and harmonious branches: the executive and the legislative. The executive is led by the mayor and their cabinet of secretaries. The legislative is exercised by the Municipal Chamber, composed of seventeen councilors. The chamber's headquarters, established on 1 April 1960, is the Poti Cavalcanti Palace, formerly the public jail.

Complementing the legislative process and the work of the secretaries, several municipal councils are active, including those for School Feeding, Social Assistance, Children's and Adolescents’ Rights, Education, Women, and Health. São Gonçalo do Amarante is home to a district of the state judiciary, located at the Desembargador Ivan Meira Lima Forum. According to the Superior Electoral Court, São Gonçalo do Amarante belongs to the 51st Electoral Zone of Rio Grande do Norte and had, as of April 2022, 71,400 voters, representing 2.836% of the state's total electorate.

== Subdivisions ==
The urban area of São Gonçalo do Amarante is divided into twelve neighborhoods.

Neighborhoods by population (IBGE/2022)
Neighborhood	Year of creation	Population
Amarante	2012	8,156 people
Centro	2016	4,995 people
Golandim	2011	7,638 people
Guajiru	2016	1,872 people
Jardim Lola	2011	7,151 people
Jardins	2011	26,955 people
Maçaranduba	2016	2,066 people
Novo Amarante	2012	8,112 people
Olho D'Água	2014	6,140 people
Parque dos Ipês	2020	-
Regomoleiro	2012	7,560 people
Santa Terezinha	2016	6,266 people
Santo Antônio do Potengi	2014	14,818 people
Arvoredo	2025	-

== Economy ==
The Gross Domestic Product of São Gonçalo do Amarante in 2010 was R$953,855, while the GDP per capita was R$10,876.34.

The primary sector contributes the smallest share to the municipal GDP. Notable is the practice of subsistence agriculture, with cultivation focused on producing fruits and vegetables. In terms of livestock farming, cattle (for milk production), goats, and sheep stand out. In terms of fishing, the cultivation of crustaceans and mollusks, particularly shrimp, mussels, oysters, and charru mussels, is prominent. São Gonçalo do Amarante also has two apiaries, one for raising bees and another for producing honey.

In the secondary sector, the most prevalent industry is ceramics, particularly the production of bricks. Eighteen kilometers from the municipal seat, the Serrinha Community is located, where mineral extraction occurs through quarries used for paving streets and avenues and in construction. São Gonçalo do Amarante has an industrial district near the border with Natal, where seventeen companies from various sectors operate.

In the tertiary sector, commerce in São Gonçalo do Amarante is notable for the sale of food products in establishments such as bars, snack bars, markets, grocery stores, and supermarkets. In addition to food products, there is also significant trade in cultural artifacts, rubber, building materials, pharmaceutical products, clothing, and textiles.

== Infrastructure ==
In 2010, the municipality had 95.01% of its over 24,000 households with piped water, 99.51% with electricity, and 91.29% with waste collection, with waste disposed of at the Metropolitan Sanitary Landfill in Ceará-Mirim. According to the latest National Basic Sanitation Survey (PNSB), conducted in 2017, the water supply network in São Gonçalo do Amarante extended 779 kilometres (484 mi), with 32,538 connections, of which 31,602 were residential. On average, 17,600 cubic metres per day (620,000 cu ft/d) of water were treated, with 16,577 cubic metres (585,400 cu ft) reaching consumption points, resulting in a loss rate of 5.8%. The daily per capita consumption was 509.1 liters per economy. The sewage collection network, however, spanned only 102 kilometres (63 mi), with an average of 6,238 cubic metres (220,300 cu ft) treated daily. The water supply and sewage treatment services in São Gonçalo do Amarante are operated by the Autonomous Water and Sewage Service (SAAE).

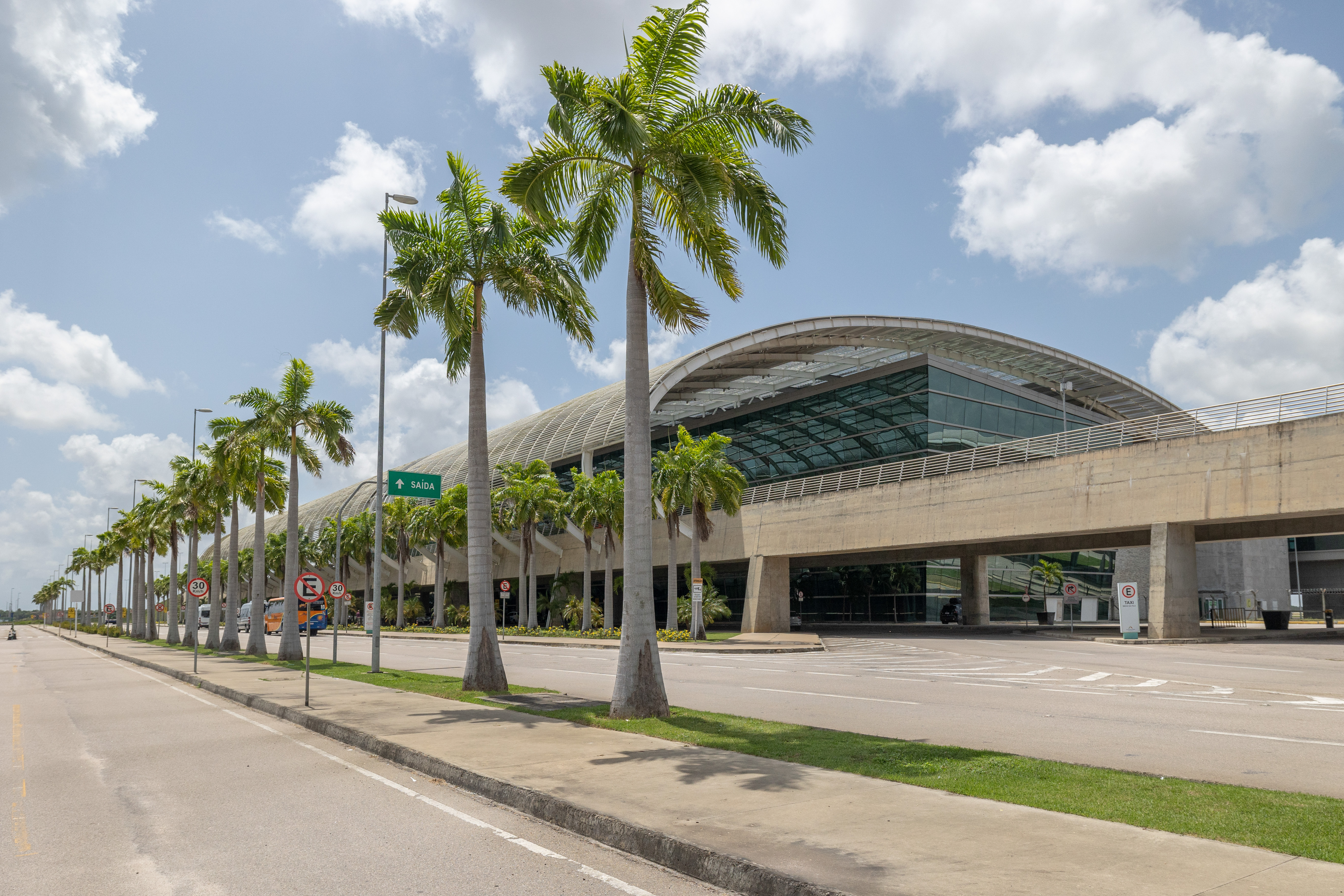
Governador Aluízio Alves International Airport, in operation since May 31, 2014

The concessionaire responsible for electricity supply is the Rio Grande do Norte Energy Company (COSERN), part of the Neoenergia Group, serving all 167 municipalities in the state. The nominal voltage of the network is 220 volts. Mobile telephone service is provided by four operators: Claro, Oi, TIM, and Vivo, with 084 as the area code or direct distance dialing (DDD). In the 2010 census, 70.43% of households had only a mobile phone, 17.53% had both mobile and landline, 1.8% had only a landline, and 10.23% had neither. The postal code (CEP) ranges from 59290–000 to 59299–999.

São Gonçalo do Amarante is home to the Governador Aluízio Alves International Airport, operational since 31 May 2014, replacing the Augusto Severo International Airport, in Parnamirim, which has since operated solely for military aviation. Administered by the Inframérica Consortium, it is the first Brazilian airport to be privatized. In terms of road transport, São Gonçalo do Amarante is intersected by the federal highways BR-101 and BR-406 and the state highways Humberto Pessoa, which connects BR-304 to the airport, and RN-160. The municipal fleet in 2020 included 13,650 cars, 9,782 motorcycles, 1,501 pickup trucks, 660 SUVs, 538 trucks, and 2,159 in other categories, totaling 28,290 vehicles. Local traffic is municipalized and managed by the Municipal Traffic Department (DEMUTRAN).

=== Healthcare ===
The healthcare network of São Gonçalo do Amarante includes thirty primary healthcare units, four health centers, two psychosocial care centers (CAPS), and one general hospital (as of August 2018), namely the Belarmina Monte Maternity Hospital, a philanthropic institution linked to the Unified Health System (SUS), inaugurated in December 1976 and managed since November 2008 by the São Camilo Beneficent Society, funded by the Municipal Health Secretariat. It offers beds for hospitalization in clinical medicine, pediatrics, surgery, and obstetrics.

Data from the Ministry of Health indicate that, between 2001 and 2016, the municipality recorded 5,860 cases of dengue, 42 of leishmaniasis, and thirteen of malaria; from 1990 to 2020, there were 247 notifications of AIDS, resulting in a rate of 16.4 cases per 100,000 inhabitants (2020). In 2019, 604 deaths were recorded due to morbidity, with diseases of the circulatory system and tumors being the primary causes, with higher incidence among men. In the same year, 1,410 live births were recorded, mostly via caesarean section, with an infant mortality rate of 14.89 deaths of children under one year per thousand live births.

=== Education ===
The education component of the HDI in the municipality reached 0.564 in 2010, while the literacy rate for the population over ten years, as indicated by the 2010 census, was 86.1% (87.7% for women and 84.4% for men). The expected years of schooling was 9.18 years, below the state average of 9.54 years.

School attendance for children aged five to six was 90.92%, and for those aged eleven to thirteen in the final years of elementary school, it was 80.82%. Among youth, these rates were lower, with 45.35% of those aged fifteen to seventeen having completed elementary school and 26.58% of those aged eighteen to twenty having completed high school. Among the population aged 25 and older, 18.42% were illiterate, 43.75% had completed elementary school, 28.09% had completed high school, and only 2.96% had completed higher education. More recent data from 2014 showed an elementary school dropout rate of 3.8%, reaching nearly 20% in high school.

The educational network of São Gonçalo do Amarante covers all levels of education, from primary education to secondary education, in both public and private sectors, with a total of 22,991 enrollments (2020 school census), the majority (14,589) in elementary education. Among higher education institutions, the Federal Institute of Rio Grande do Norte (IFRN) stands out, inaugurated in December 2012 on the same site as the former Rockefeller Farm.

== Culture ==
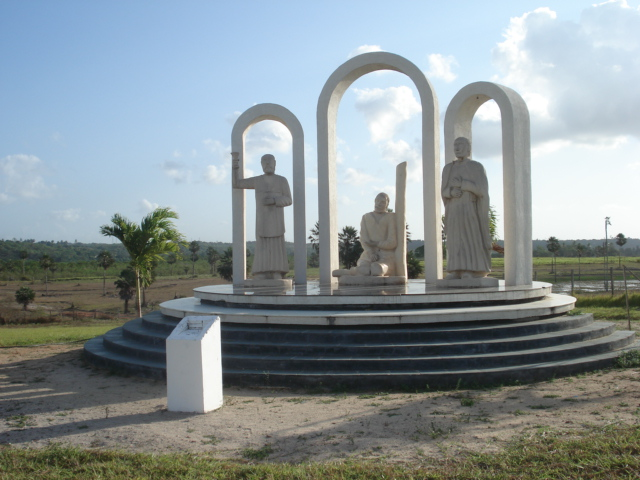
Monument to the Martyrs, inaugurated in December 2000 at the site of the Uruaçu massacre

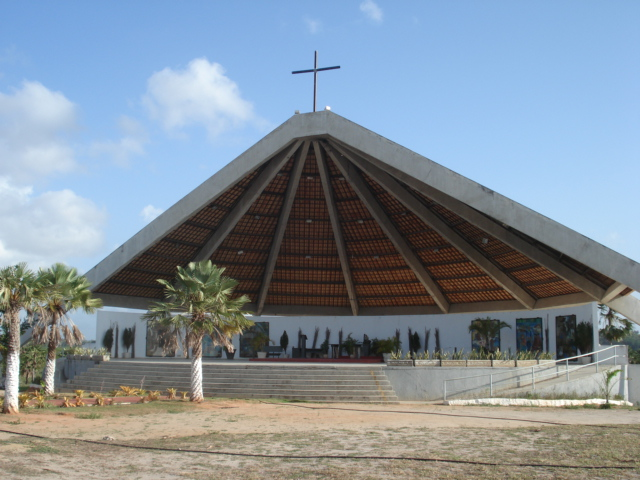
Chapel of the Martyrs of Cunhaú and Uruaçu, adjacent to the Monument to the Martyrs

São Gonçalo do Amarante holds a prominent position in Rio Grande do Norte for its cultural production. It is home to the Poti Cavalcanti Municipal Theater, inaugurated in 2003 with a capacity for 238 people, considered the cultural hub of the municipality, hosting various events. It is the birthplace of Militana Salustino do Nascimento, known as Dona Militana (1925–2010), an icon of Rio Grande do Norte's popular culture. Municipal holidays include 28 January, the day of the patron saint Gundisalvus of Amarante; 29 October, the day of the patron Saint Benedict; and 11 December, the date of political emancipation, the latter established in 1990 and the others in 1978.

=== Religiosity and events ===
Religiosity in São Gonçalo do Amarante is closely tied to the Martyrs of Cunhaú and Uruaçu. They were killed in a massacre on 3 October 1645, for resisting the Dutch. Also called Flamengos, the Dutch invaded the territory corresponding to the current northeast Brazil to collect debts from the Portuguese for building mills in the colony. As a result of this episode, few survived, and around eighty people died, taken to neighboring communities and the Keulen Castle, now the Fortaleza dos Reis Magos. In 1989, the massacre victims were recognized as martyrs and beatified by Pope John Paul II on 5 March 2000. The Monument to the Martyrs was erected at the massacre site and inaugurated nine months later.

The municipality's cultural calendar includes major events such as the feast of Saint Sebastian, celebrated in some villages on 19 January; the feast of Saint Gundisalvus on 28 January, a municipal holiday; the Drivers’ Festival on 30 May; the feast of Saint Anthony in the Santo Antônio do Potengi district on 12 June; the traditional Santa Terezinha festival and donkey race, both in September in the Guanduba community; the feasts of Saint Francis (in the Alagadiço Grande and Rio da Prata communities), Saint Benedict, Our Lady of Expectation (in the Rego Moleiro village), and the commemoration of the Martyrs of Uruaçu in October; the feast of Saint Jude in the Jacaré-Mirim and Uruaçu villages in November; and the feasts of Saint Lucy (in Igreja Nova and the Serrinha community) and political emancipation in December.

=== Cuisine and handicrafts ===
The cuisine of São Gonçalo do Amarante features traditional dishes such as shrimp, free-range chicken, and various other crustaceans. In the rural area, the Pajuçara community, though sparsely populated, is a reference for gastronomy in the Natal Metropolitan Region, with several establishments where shrimp is the most consumed dish. From it, various dishes are prepared, such as shrimp au gratin and shrimp pap, combined with other foods. Additionally, the production of sweets and liqueurs flavored with tropical fruits stands out in the Rio da Prata community.

Handicrafts are another form of spontaneous cultural expression in São Gonçalo do Amarante, with distinctive artisanal production found throughout various parts of the municipality, crafted in accordance with local culture and way of life. Several groups bring together artisans from the region, providing spaces for the creation, exhibition, and sale of handmade products made from regional raw materials such as clay, liana, scraps, and sisal. These items are typically sold at fairs, exhibitions, or craft shops, such as the Craft Market located in the Santo Antônio do Potengi district along the RN-160 state highway.

=== Monuments and historical sites ===
Settlements

The settlement of Barreiros is one of the oldest in the municipality, located near the Potengi River estuary, where fishing is practiced. During the early settlement of São Gonçalo do Amarante, it housed a river port that provided access to Natal. The former settlement of Poço Limpo emerged in the second half of the 19th century and was the scene of several conflicts. It belonged to the municipality of São Gonçalo do Amarante until 1943 and corresponds to the current municipality of Ielmo Marinho.

The settlement of Regomoleiro is notable for two significant events in the municipality's history: the first was the death of Jacob Rabbi, a defender of Dutch interests in the region, and the second was the participation of Maria do Carmo Brito, the first woman to serve as president of the São Gonçalo do Amarante City Council. Its original name was Rodrigo Moleiro, after the owner of an old grain mill. In 1910, the municipal administration proposed renaming it Alberto Maranhão, but the change never took effect. The Rego Moleiro chapel, one of the oldest structures in São Gonçalo do Amarante, is located in this settlement.

The settlement of Santo Antônio dos Barreiros was established as a village in 1885, originating from the interests of a landowning family that inhabited the area. It emerged near the Barreiros village, hence its name. In the 1970s, it was renamed Santo Antônio do Potengi, which has since undergone a process of urbanization. It preserves important historical landmarks of the municipality, such as the old Matoso family mansion and the São Francisco sugar mill.

Churches

The Utinga Chapel was built around 1730, according to official documents, and is dedicated to Our Lady of Perpetual Help. The chapel served as a route for Dutch occupation in the 18th century and has been listed as a heritage site by the José Augusto Foundation of Rio Grande do Norte since 1989. It is believed that the oldest road in the state, connecting Baía da Traição in Paraíba to Natal, passed through the Utinga Chapel. The term Utinga, in the indigenous language, means white water.

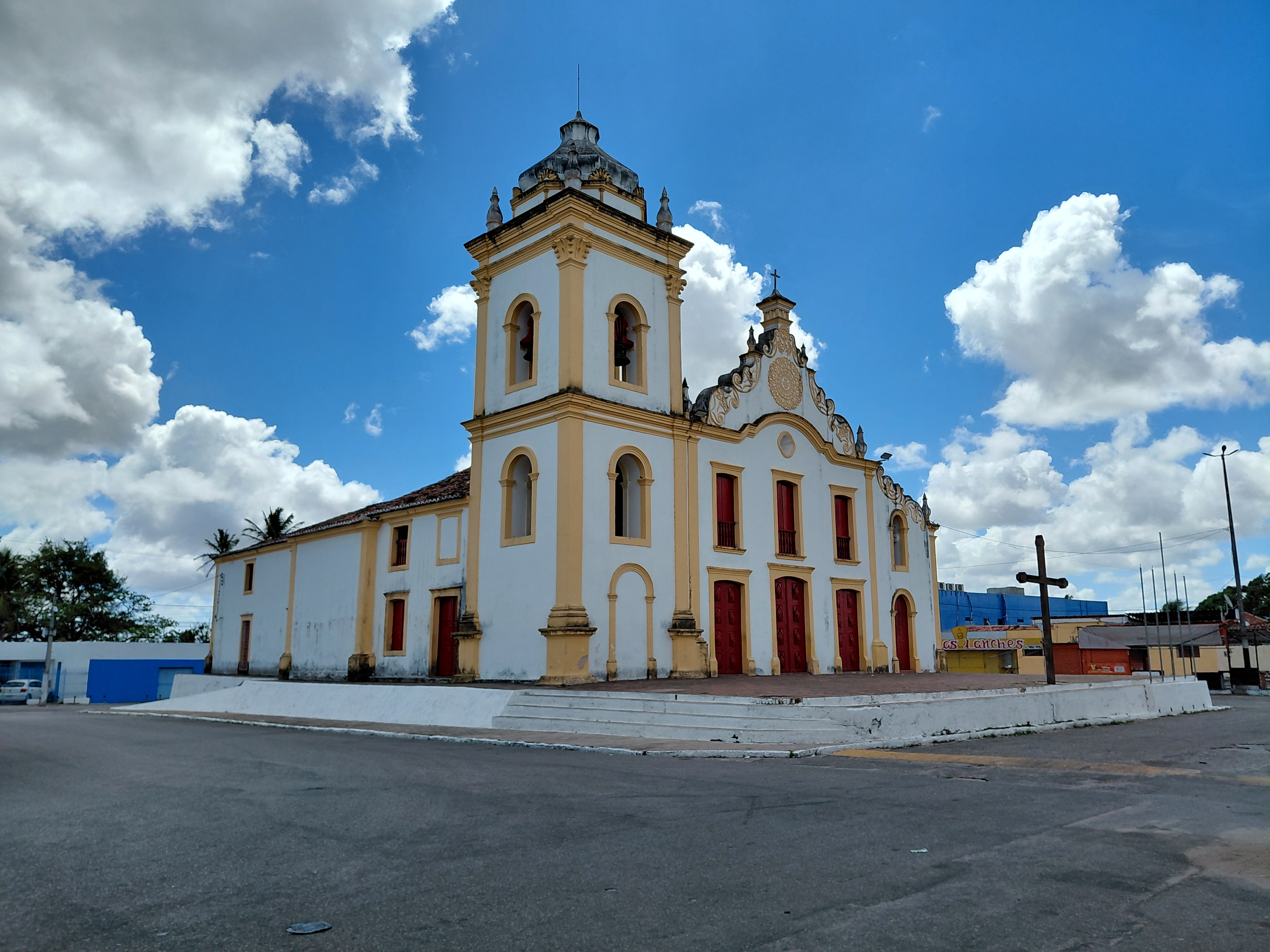
Parish church of São Gonçalo do Amarante

The Santo Antônio do Potengi Chapel was constructed in 1885 (the year carved on the chapel's facade to this day) and is situated in an elevated area, offering a brief view of the urban area of São Gonçalo do Amarante. A possible legend suggests that the chapel was built in honor of two women who discovered an image of Saint Anthony inside a cave. They took the image home, but it reportedly disappeared and was later found in the same cave where it was originally discovered.

The Parish Church was built in the 18th century, in 1719, and completed only in the 19th century. It houses several antique wooden statues and altars that feature Baroque-style characteristics. It is considered the most representative historical monument of São Gonçalo do Amarante and was listed by the National Institute of Historic and Artistic Heritage (IPHAN) in 1963.

The New Church was founded in 1867 by Joaquim Félix de Lima and is dedicated to the Immaculate Conception. Also built in the Baroque style, it is another significant monument of the municipality. It is located opposite a square where a cross once stood, formerly used for donkey races.

Other monuments

The Olho d’Água do Lucas Mansion was built in the mid-19th century, in 1853, and is named after the Lucas family, its first owners. Today, the monument contains remnants of the local sugar mill and ancient drawings made by slaves.

The Martyrs’ Cross is located five kilometers from the municipal seat, in the Uruaçu settlement, and dates back to the early 17th century, around 1609. It served as a symbol of local resistance against the Dutch, where residents of the Potengi sugar mill fought against abuses by the Dutch administration. On 3 October 1645, one of the most significant events in the history of Rio Grande do Norte, the Uruaçu Massacre, took place near the current Uruaçu settlement, which houses the Martyrs’ Monument. Three kilometers away is the Marty_daily life. Several groups bring together artisans from the region, providing spaces for the creation, exhibition, and sale of handmade products made from regional raw materials such as clay, liana, fabric scraps, and sisal. These items are typically sold at fairs, exhibitions, or craft shops, such as the Craft Market located in the Santo Antônio do Potengi district along the RN-160 state highway.

=== Monuments and historical sites ===
Settlements

The settlement of Barreiros is one of the oldest in the municipality, located near the Potengi River estuary, where fishing is practiced. During the early settlement of São Gonçalo do Amarante, it housed a river port that provided access to Natal. The former settlement of Poço Limpo emerged in the second half of the 19th century and was the scene of several conflicts. It belonged to the municipality of São Gonçalo do Amarante until 1943 and corresponds to the current municipality of Ielmo Marinho.

The settlement of Rego Moleiro is notable for two significant events in the municipality's history: the first was the death of Jacob Rabbi, a defender of Dutch interests in the region, and the second was the participation of Maria do Carmo Brito, the first woman to serve as president of the São Gonçalo do Amarante City Council. Its original name was Rodrigo Moleiro, after the owner of an old grain mill. In 1910, the municipal administration proposed renaming it Alberto Maranhão, but the change never took effect. The Rego Moleiro chapel, one of the oldest structures in São Gonçalo do Amarante, is located in this settlement.

The settlement of Santo Antônio dos Barreiros was established as a village in 1885, originating from the interests of a landowning family that inhabited the area. It emerged near the Barreiros village, hence its name. In the 1970s, it was renamed Santo Antônio do Potengi, which has since undergone a process of urbanization. It preserves important historical landmarks of the municipality, such as the old Matoso family mansion and the São Francisco sugar mill.

Churches

The Utinga Chapel was built around 1730, according to official documents, and is dedicated to Our Lady of Perpetual Help. The chapel served as a route for Dutch occupation in the 18th century and has been listed as a heritage site by the José Augusto Foundation of Rio Grande do Norte since 1989. It is believed that the oldest road in the state, connecting Baía da Traição in Paraíba to Natal, passed through the Utinga Chapel. The term Utinga, in the indigenous language, means white water.

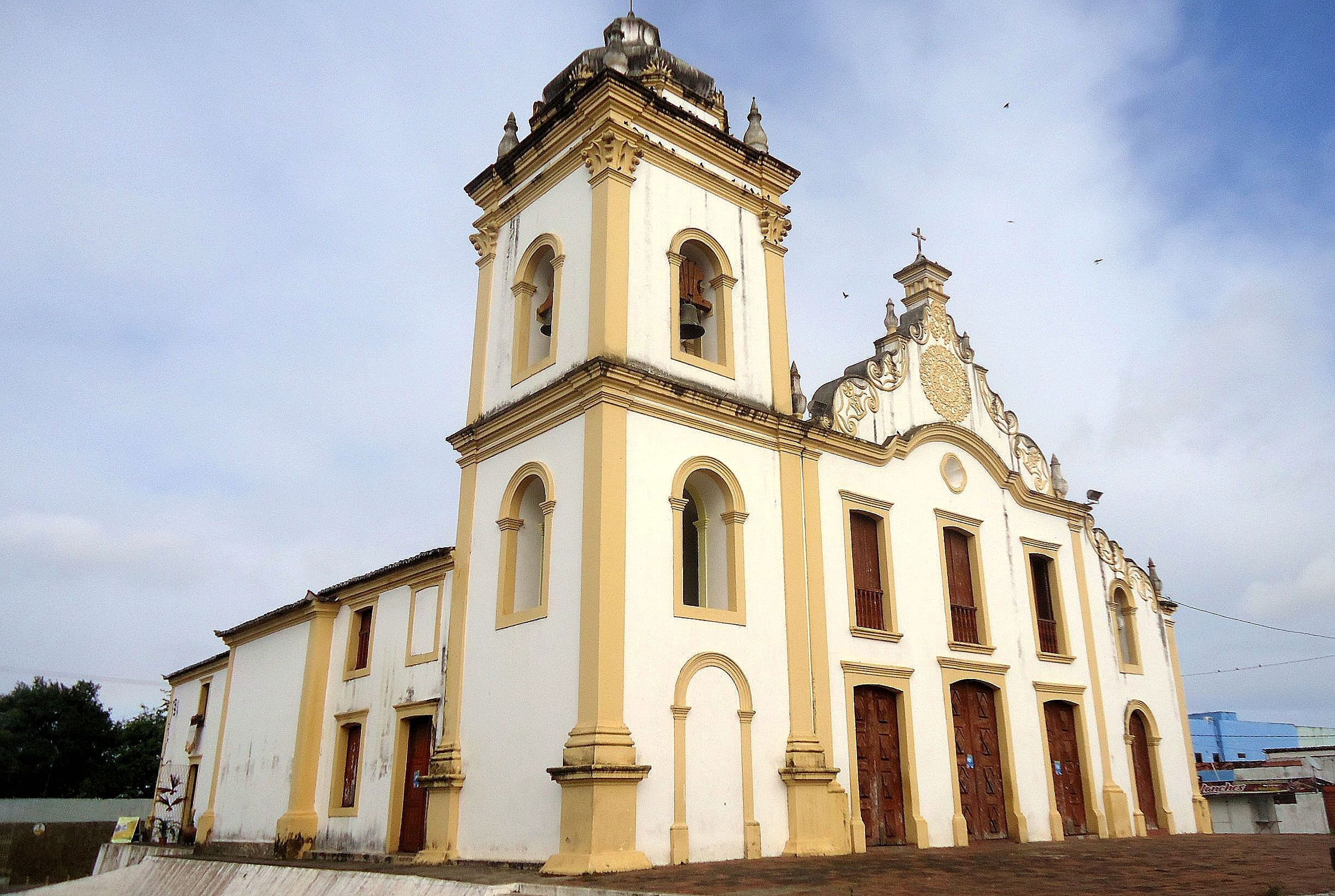
São Gonçalo Matrix Church

The Santo Antônio do Potengi Chapel was constructed in 1885 (the year carved on the chapel's facade to this day) and is situated in an elevated area, offering a brief view of the urban area of São Gonçalo do Amarante. A possible legend suggests that the chapel was built in honor of two women who discovered an image of Saint Anthony inside a cave. They took the image home, but it reportedly disappeared and was later found in the same cave where it was originally discovered.

The Matrix Church was built in the 18th century, in 1719, and completed only in the 19th century. It houses several antique wooden statues and altars featuring characteristics of Baroque style. It is considered the most representative historical monument of São Gonçalo do Amarante and was listed by the National Historical and Artistic Heritage Institute (IPHAN) in 1963.

The New Church was founded in 1867 by Joaquim Félix de Lima and is dedicated to the Immaculate Conception. Also built in the Baroque style, it is another significant monument of the municipality. It is located opposite a square where a cross once stood, formerly used for donkey races.

Other monuments

The Olho d’Água do Lucas Mansion was built in the mid-19th century, in 1853, and is named after the Lucas family, its first owners. Today, the monument contains remnants of the local sugar mill and ancient drawings made by slaves.

The Martyrs’ Cross is located five kilometers from the municipal seat, in the Uruaçu settlement, and dates back to the early 17th century, around 1609. It served as a symbol of local resistance against the Dutch, where residents of the Potengi sugar mill fought against abuses by the Dutch administration. On 3 October 1645, one of the most significant events in the history of Rio Grande do Norte, the Uruaçu Massacre, took place near the current Uruaçu settlement, which houses the Martyrs’ Monument. Three kilometers away is the Martyrs’ Chapel, dedicated to Saint John the Baptist, which has undergone several renovations.

The Martyrs’ Monument is a concrete altar inaugurated on 5 December 2000, and built for potential Mass celebrations, with a capacity for thirty thousand people.

== See also ==
- List of municipalities in Rio Grande do Norte
