= Ceará-Mirim =

Municipality in Rio Grande do Norte, Brazil

- Municipality
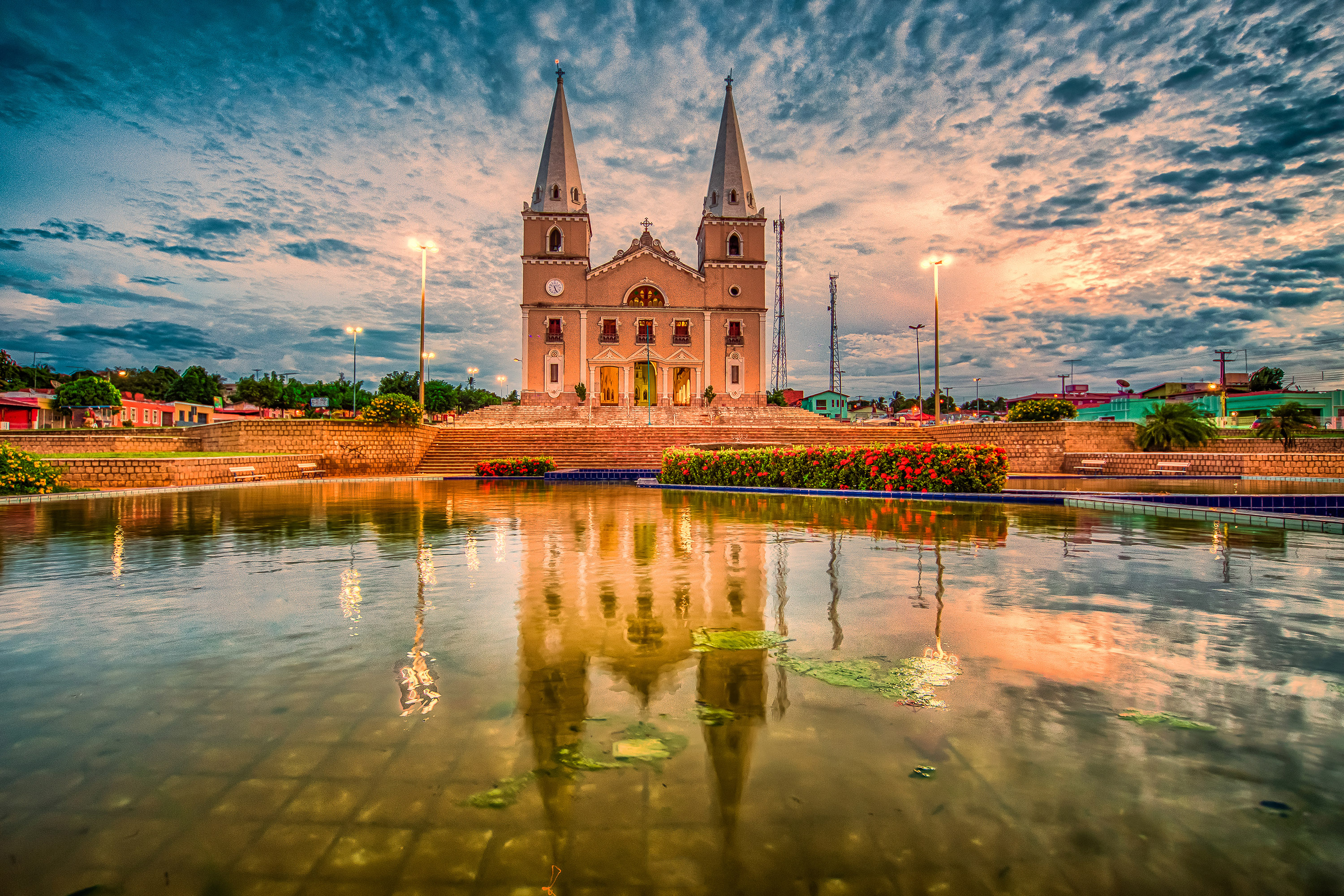

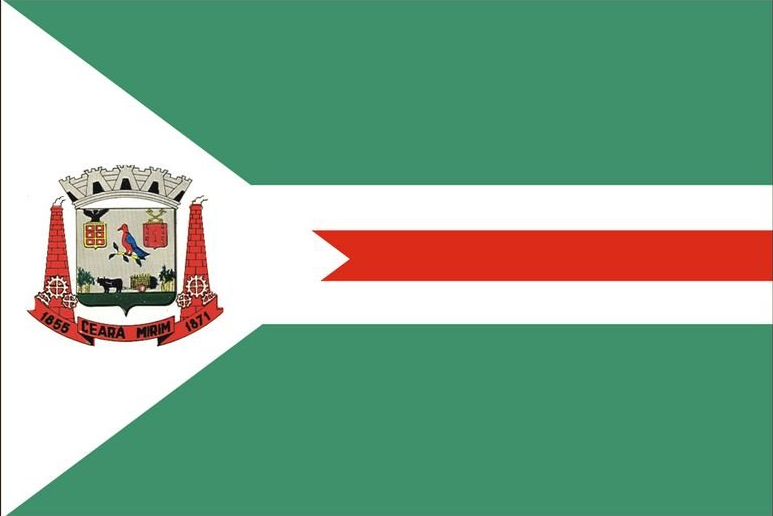
- Flag Coat of arms

- Location in Rio Grande do Norte state

- Location in Brazil
- Coordinates: 5°38′S 35°26′W
- Country: Brazil
- Region: Northeast
- State: Rio Grande do Norte

Area
  - Total: 724.838 km^{2} (279.862 sq mi)

Population (2022)
  - Total: 79,115
- Time zone: UTC−3 (BRT)

Ceará-Mirim is a city in the state of Rio Grande do Norte in the Northeast region of Brazil. With an area of 724.838 square kilometers (279.862 sq mi), of which 28.5233 square kilometres (11.0129 sq mi) is urban, it is located 30 km from Natal, the state capital, and 1,771 km from Brasília, the federal capital. Its population in the 2022 demographic census was 79,115 inhabitants, according to the Brazilian Institute of Geography and Statistics (IBGE), ranking as the sixth most populous municipality in the state of Rio Grande do Norte.

== Etymology ==
The origin of the city name is unknown. Câmara Cascudo, one of the most important historians in Brazil, gives some alternatives from other authors, with all the alternatives leading to the Tupi language. José de Alencar suggests to us that Ceará comes from the Tupi expression cê-ará, meaning "the parrot speaks" or "the parrot sings". Teodoro Sampaio gives us ceará or cemo-ará, which is "the parrot leaves" or "the parrot's departure". There are also the versions of Paulino Nogueira and João Brigido, who suggest, respectively, çoô-ará and ciri-ará, which mean "truly hunting time" and "white crab", respectively.

== History ==
The origins of the settlement of Ceará-Mirim are linked to the Potiguara Indigenous people, who lived along the banks of the Rio Pequeno, which was later renamed the Ceará-Mirim River. The Potiguara engaged in clandestine trade of brazilwood with French and Spanish merchants, and eventually with the Portuguese colonizers, exchanging the valuable timber for various goods. The brazilwood, which was abundant in the region, was transported via a rudimentary navigation system using the waters of the Gramoré River.

The Portuguese, in collaboration with Filipe Camarão, undertook efforts to organize a settlement in the area. A convent was established in the village of Guajiru, and on lands granted to the Jesuit priests of the Society of Jesus, they constructed a church, a jail, and a town hall. Through their work in organizing the community, the Jesuits earned the trust and admiration of the local Indigenous population.

While the Indigenous people supported the presence of the Jesuits, the Portuguese colonists did not, as they were primarily interested in the fertile lands of the valley. They sought to remove the Jesuits, whose moral authority and influence posed a challenge to colonial ambitions. A Royal Charter issued by the Marquis of Pombal eventually banned Jesuits from participating in the administration and education of the settlement, without providing a clear reason. Following the expulsion of the Jesuits, the Portuguese colonists assumed control, free from religious oversight.

Under pressure from the colonists, the Indigenous population began selling their lands to outsiders. Around this period, enslaved Africans were brought to the region, marking the beginning of forced labor and the establishment of sugarcane plantations (engenhos), which would go on to dominate the local economy and shape the historical trajectory of the Ceará-Mirim Valley. A distinct local society emerged, centered around the powerful sugar plantation owners who were aware of their economic dominance and lived in a manner marked by aristocratic refinement and elegance. By the end of the 19th century, the valley prospered through sugarcane production. A culture of wealth and opulence took hold, with aristocratic balls, silk-lined carriages, and lavish festivities reflecting the patriarchal and slave-based phase of the sugar economy.

The municipality was officially created on 3 September 1759 by royal charter and formally established on 3 May 1760 in the former village of Guajiru, with its administrative seat in the town of the Extremoz. On 18 August 1885, the seat was transferred to the settlement of Boca da Mata, which was renamed the town of Ceará-Mirim. However, the transfer was suspended by Law No. 345 on 4 September 1856 and later reinstated by Law No. 370 on 30 July 1858. On 9 June 1882, through Law No. 837, Ceará-Mirim was granted city status. In the letters of the Ouvidor Domingos Monteiro da Rocha, in July 1757, he included the Ceará-Mirim Village, where he says "with many residents". The first school emerged only in 1858, installed at Bôca da Mata, Extremoz county. The first meeting of the city council occurred on 14 October 1858, in Ceará-Mirim Village.

== Geography ==
The territory of Ceará-Mirim covers 724.838 square kilometers (279.862 sq mi), of which 28.5233 square kilometres (11.0129 sq mi) constitutes the urban area. It sits at an average altitude of 33 meters above sea level. Ceará-Mirim borders these municipalities: to the north, Maxaranguape; to the south, São Gonçalo do Amarante, Extremoz, and Ielmo Marinho; to the east, Extremoz and Maxaranguape; and to the west, Taipu. The city is located 30 km from the state capital Natal, and 1,771 km from the federal capital Brasília.

Under the territorial division established in 2017 by the Brazilian Institute of Geography and Statistics (IBGE), the municipality belongs to the immediate geographical region of Natal, within the intermediate region of Natal. Previously, under the microregion and mesoregion divisions, it was part of the microregion of Macaíba in the mesoregion of Leste Potiguar.

Climate data for Ceará-Mirim (1981–2010)
Month	Jan	Feb	Mar	Apr	May	Jun	Jul	Aug	Sep	Oct	Nov	Dec	Year
Mean daily maximum °C (°F)	31.5 (88.7)	31.7 (89.1)	31.4 (88.5)	30.7 (87.3)	30.3 (86.5)	29.3 (84.7)	29.0 (84.2)	29.3 (84.7)	30.1 (86.2)	30.9 (87.6)	31.4 (88.5)	31.7 (89.1)	30.6 (87.1)
Daily mean °C (°F)	27.0 (80.6)	27.0 (80.6)	26.9 (80.4)	26.4 (79.5)	26.0 (78.8)	25.0 (77.0)	24.5 (76.1)	24.5 (76.1)	25.2 (77.4)	26.0 (78.8)	26.4 (79.5)	26.9 (80.4)	26.0 (78.8)
Mean daily minimum °C (°F)	22.8 (73.0)	22.8 (73.0)	23.0 (73.4)	22.8 (73.0)	22.3 (72.1)	21.5 (70.7)	20.8 (69.4)	20.6 (69.1)	20.9 (69.6)	21.5 (70.7)	22.0 (71.6)	22.5 (72.5)	22.0 (71.6)
Average precipitation mm (inches)	89.2 (3.51)	88.9 (3.50)	185.5 (7.30)	200.5 (7.89)	182.2 (7.17)	229.3 (9.03)	169.6 (6.68)	83.9 (3.30)	32.5 (1.28)	13.7 (0.54)	19.5 (0.77)	19.8 (0.78)	1,314.6 (51.76)
Average precipitation days (≥ 1.0 mm)	7	7	13	15	13	14	13	9	6	3	3	4	107
Average relative humidity (%)	76.8	77.7	79.2	82.3	82.9	84.0	82.7	80.8	77.5	74.4	74.3	74.9	79.0
Mean monthly sunshine hours	238.3	216.1	215.4	190.6	208.7	180.2	201.3	234.2	255.2	277.0	273.5	279.4	2,769.9
Source: Instituto Nacional de Meteorologia

== Demographics ==
In the 2022 census, the municipality had a population of 79,115 inhabitants and ranked sixth in the state that year (out of 167 municipalities), with 50.36% female and 49.64% male, resulting in a sex ratio of 98.56 (9,856 men for every 10,000 women), compared to 68,141 inhabitants in the 2010 census (52.09% living in the urban area), when it held the sixth state position. Between the 2010 and 2022 censuses, the population of Ceará-Mirim changed at an annual geometric growth rate of 1.25%. Regarding age group in the 2022 census, 68.59% of the inhabitants were between 15 and 64 years old, 22.53% were under fifteen, and 8.89% were 65 or older. The population density in 2022 was 109.15 inhabitants per square kilometer. There were 24,896 housing units with an average of 3.13 inhabitants per household.

The municipality's Human Development Index (HDI-M) was considered medium, according to data from the United Nations Development Programme (UNDP). According to the 2010 report published in 2013, its value was 0.616, ranking 132nd in the state and 4,540th nationally (out of 5,565 municipalities), and the Gini coefficient rose from 0.42 in 2003 to 0.52 in 2010. Considering only the longevity index, its value is 0.774, the income index is 0.599, and the education index is 0.505.
