= Taipu =

Taipu may mean:

- Taipu, Rio Grande do Norte, a city in Brazil
- Dabu (Taipu), a county in China's Guangdong Province
