= Greater Natal =

Area of Rio grande do Norte, Brazil

Coordinates: 5°47′42″S 35°12′32″W

Greater Natal area in Rio Grande do Norte state.

The Greater Natal (lit. Grande Natal, officially Natal Metropolitan Region, lit. Região Metropolitana de Natal) is a metropolitan area located in Rio Grande do Norte state in Brazil. It consists of nine municipalities, including the capital, Natal.

The metropolitan area of Natal is known as a historical, cultural and economic center of state, with a total population of 1,263 million inhabitants. The region was first officially defined on January 16, 1997. Only a few municipalities show a high level of agglomeration — namely, Natal-Parnamirim and Natal-São Gonçalo do Amarante.

The state government's greatest challenge is connecting all the cities in the metropolitan area by bus. There is a plan called "Via Metropolitana" (Metropolitan Highway) to connect all cities.

== Municipalities in Greater Natal ==
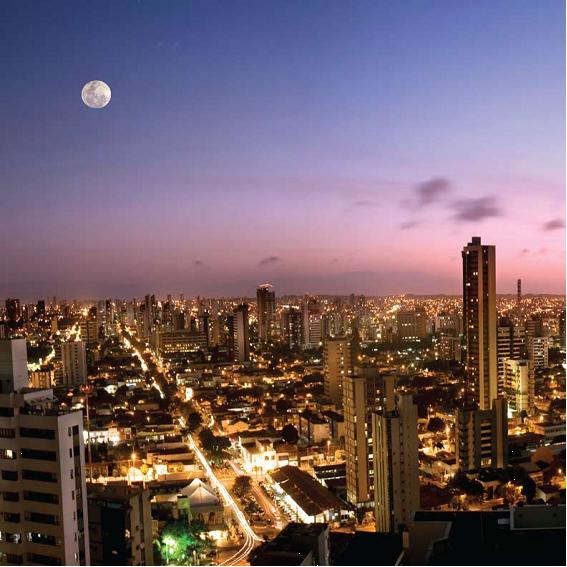
Natal

Municipality	Area (km^{2})	Population (2007)	GDP R$ (2006)
Natal	170,298	774.230	7.508.466
Ceará-Mirim	739,686	65.450	247.860
Extremoz (pt)	125,665	21.792	96.887
Macaíba (pt)	512,487	63.337	527.652
Monte Alegre (pt)	200,000	20.590	63.266
Nísia Floresta (pt)	306,051	22.906	95.767
Parnamirim	120,202	172.751	1.269.568
São Gonçalo do Amarante	251,308	77.363	677.341
São José de Mipibu (pt)	293,877	36.990	172.328
Total	2.719,574	1.255.409	10.659.135
