= António Filipe =

António Filipe may refer to:

- António Filipe Camarão (1580–1648), Brazilian soldier
- António Filipe (politician) (born 1963), Portuguese politician
- António Filipe de Sousa Gouveia (born 1973), Portuguese former footballer who played as a midfielder
- António Filipe (footballer, born 1985), Portuguese footballer who plays as a goalkeeper
