= Genipabu =

Beach in Rio Grande do Norte, Brazil

Coordinates: 5°42′32″S 35°11′48″W

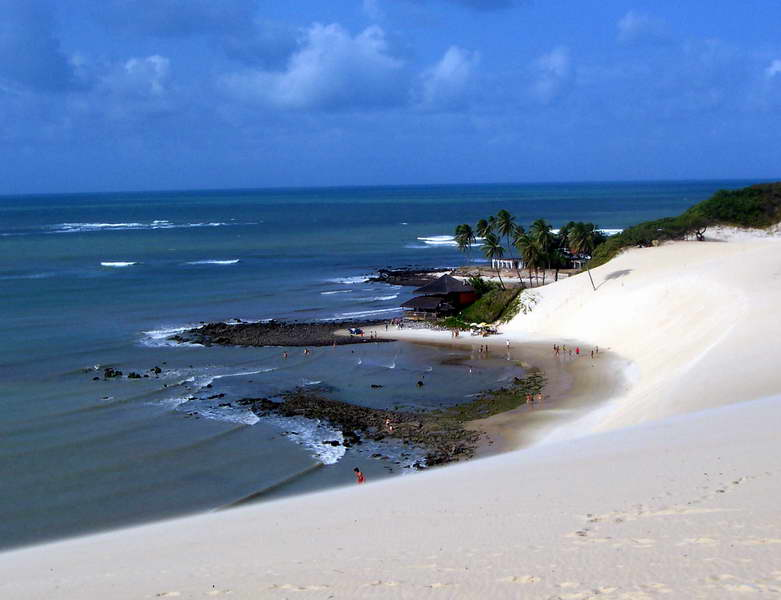
Dunes of Genipabu.

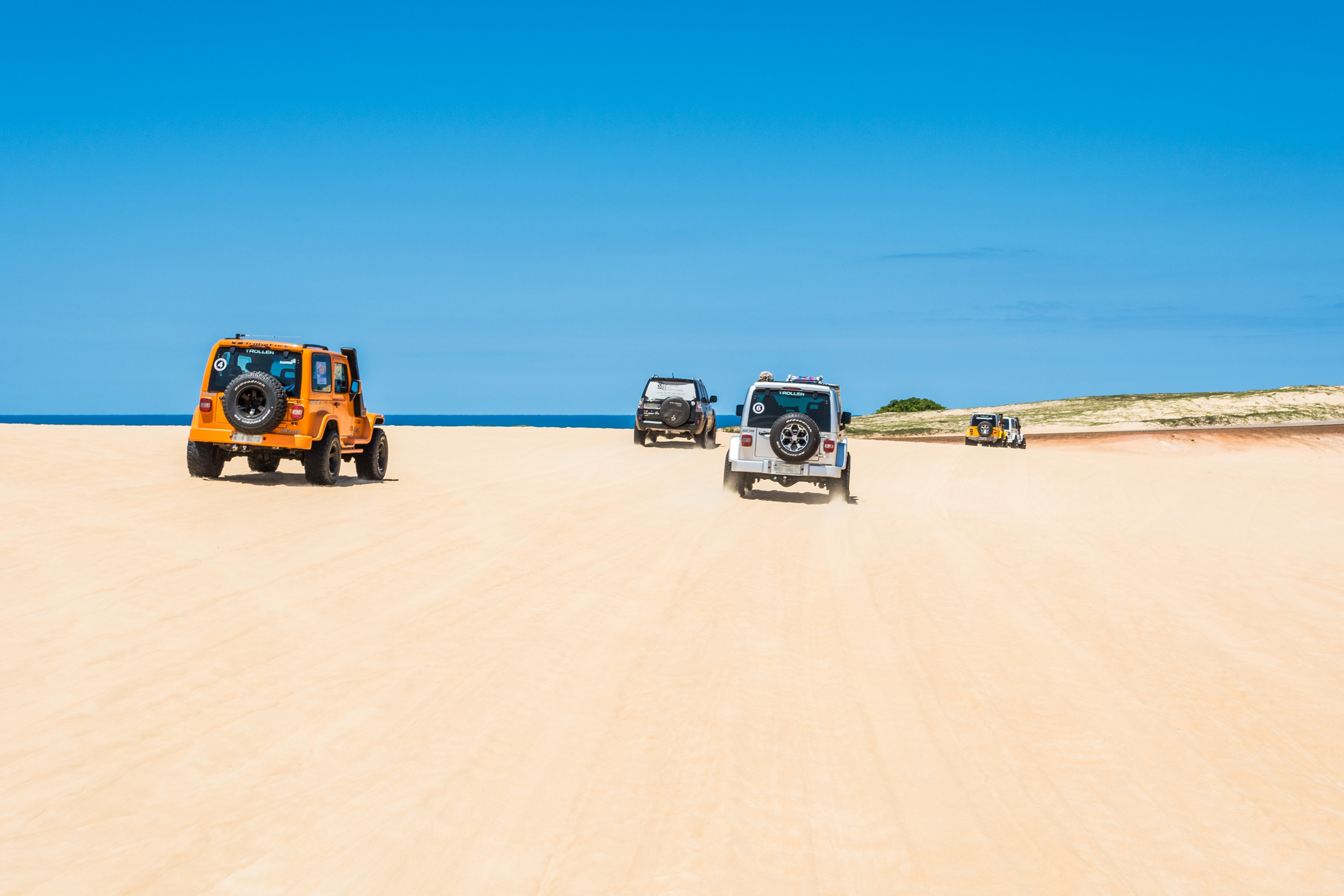
Dune buggies in Genipabu.

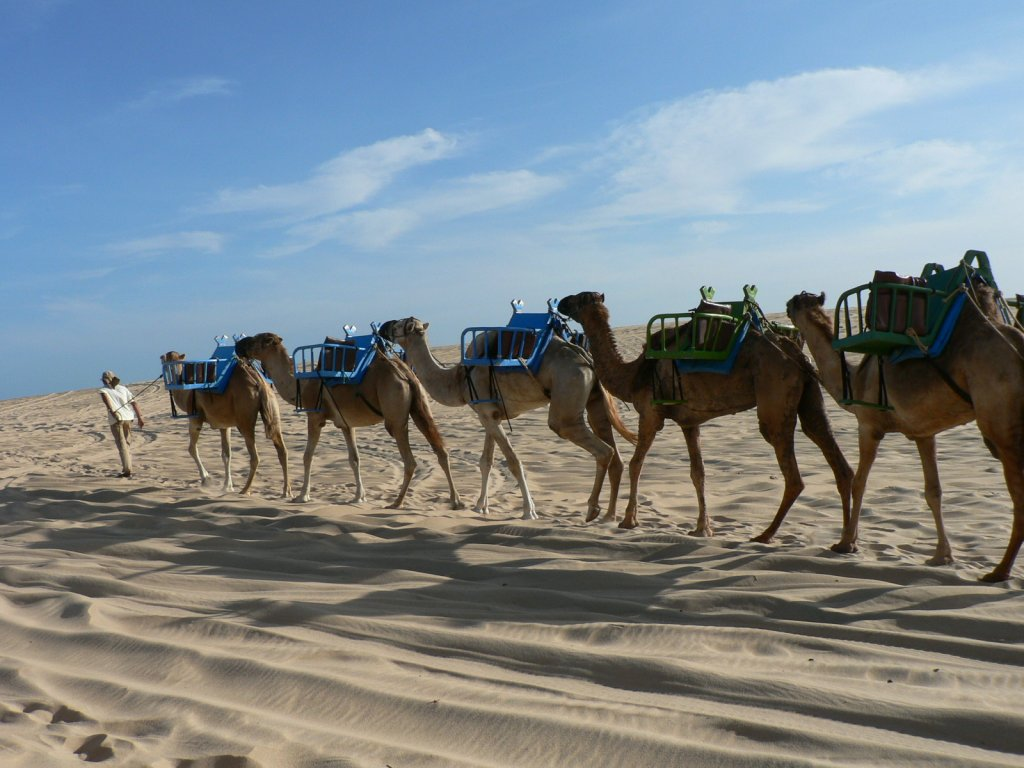
Dromedary camel in Genipabu (terminated in the 2010s).

Genipabu or Jenipabu (Brazilian Portuguese pronunciation: [ʒenipaˈbu]) is a beach with a complex of dunes, a lagoon and an environmental protection area (EPA) also popular scenic coastal spot located approximately 20 kilometers north of Natal, in the municipality of Extremoz, Rio Grande do Norte Brazilian state.

Genipabu is used for "buggie" and formerly dromedary rides. Camel rides on the dunes were popular for many years, but as of 2020, they are no longer available. A sport that is played in the dunes around the lake is the "esquibunda", in which a person slides the dunes with a wooden board.

"Buggie" rides are offered locally in two styles, com emoção (lit:'with emotion': a riskier ride) or sem emoção (lit:'without emotion': a safer one). One should be aware, however, that only authorized professionals responsible for security of both tourists and environment should be hired.

The dunes of Genipabu are movable, because the hard winds in the Rio Grande do Norte coastline moves the sand from one point to another, shaping the landscape.
