= Dona Militana =

Brazilian singer (1925–2010)

- Born: Militana Salustino do Nascimento; 19 March 1925; São Gonçalo do Amarante, Rio Grande do Sul, Brazil
- Died: 19 June 2010 (aged 85); São Gonçalo do Amarante, Brazil
- Occupation: singer

Militana Salustino do Nascimento (19 March 1925 - 19 June 2010), best known as Dona Militana, was a Brazilian folk singer specialized in a romancero repertoire.

== Life and career ==
Born in São Gonçalo do Amarante, the daughter of cantastorie Atanásio Salustino do Nascimento (best known as Mestre do Fandango), since when she was a child Militana made humble works such as crop planting and basket weaving. While working, she used to recite ancient romancero folk songs about stories of medieval kingdoms his father had taught her, some of which were over 700 years old. She became first known thanks to researches of folklorist Deífilo Gurgel in the 1990s, and later went on record the triple album Cantares, which included 54 romance songs. In September 2005, she received the Order of Cultural Merit from President Luiz Inácio Lula da Silva.

== Death ==
On 10 June 2010, the singer felt ill and was taken to hospital, where she was hospitalised for two days; after a brief improvement in her condition, she was discharged. Voiceless and feeding through a gastric tube, she began home treatment in the care of her children.

Militana died at her home on 19 June 2010, at the age of 85.
