= Clara Camarão =

Indigenous Brazilian warrior

Clara Camarão (fl. 1637) was an indigenous Brazilian warrior of the Potiguara people. She was converted to Christianity by the Portuguese Jesuits and baptized Clara Camarão. During the Dutch invasions in 1630–1637, she led the Potiguara warriors in defense of Brazil against the invaders in Goiana and Recife.

She was married to the famous Indigenous leader and commander Poty, who was also known as Antonio Felippe Camarão. Clara was noted to always be with her husband, fighting alongside him.
