= Filipe Camarão =

Portiguara soldier in service of Portugal

Filipe Camarão CvC
- Poti
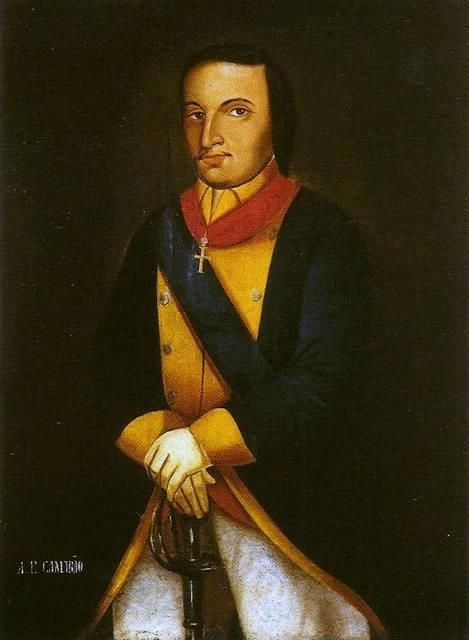
- 17th century portrait of Filipe Camarão
- Born: c. 1580; Northeast of Brazil
- Died: 24 August 1648 (aged 67–68); Arraial Novo do Bom Jesus, Pernambuco, Brazil
- Spouse: Clara Filipa Camarão (m. 1612)
- Military career
- Service years: 1630–1648

Signature
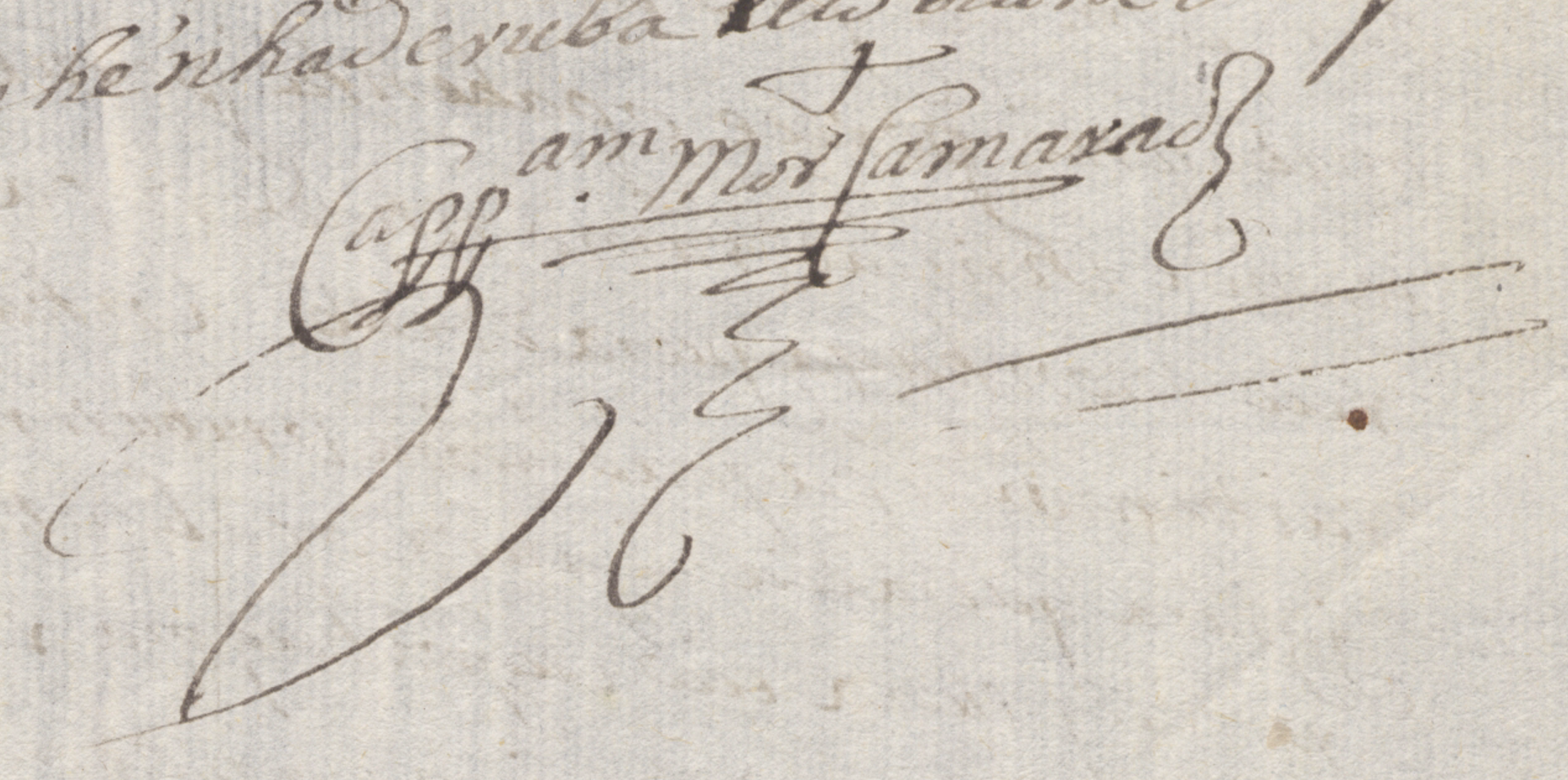

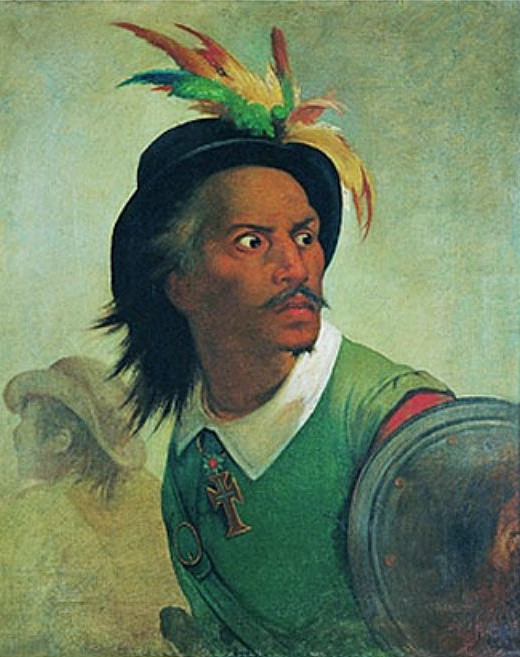
Portrait of Filipe Camarão, by Victor Meirelles, oil on canvas, ca. 1874–78, Museu Victor Meirelles

D. Antônio Filipe Camarão (c. 1580 – 24 August 1648) was an Indigenous soldier from the Potiguara tribe near the Rio Grande do Norte area of the Portuguese colony of Brazil. His original tribal name was Poti, which means "prawn" (Portuguese: camarão). He was born in the neighbourhood of Igapó, in Natal, or, according to some other historians, in the state of Pernambuco, or in Aldeia Velha.

On the occasion of his conversion to the Christian faith on 13 June 1612 (the feast day of Saint Anthony) he chose the Portuguese version of the name — Antônio — and the middle name Filipe, in honor of King Philip II of Portugal, adding the Portuguese version of his tribal name, Poti. He married the very next day in the Capela de São Miguel de Guajeru to a lady from his tribe who also converted to Christianity and took the name Clara. Besides knowing perfect Portuguese, he was also well-versed in Latin because of his education in a missionary school led by Jesuit monks.

Since 1630, he fought against the Dutch forces who tried to take over Brazil. He fought them as the leader of an indigenous regiment on various battles until his death in 1648. The last year of his life brought him to the top of his military career as leader of the right flank of the United Portuguese Army during the First Battle of Guararapes against General Arciszewski.

By royal decision, Antônio Filipe Camarão was given the right to use the title "Dom". He was also a Knight of the Order of Christ, the most prestigious order of Portugal. He was buried in the neighborhood of Várzea, in Recife, on 24 August 1648.

There are several ways of writing the name. In Brazil, for example, it is common to read the name in the archaic spelling "Felipe Camarão" or "Antônio Felipe Camarão".
