= Extremoz =

Municipality in Rio Grande do Norte, Brazil

- Municipality
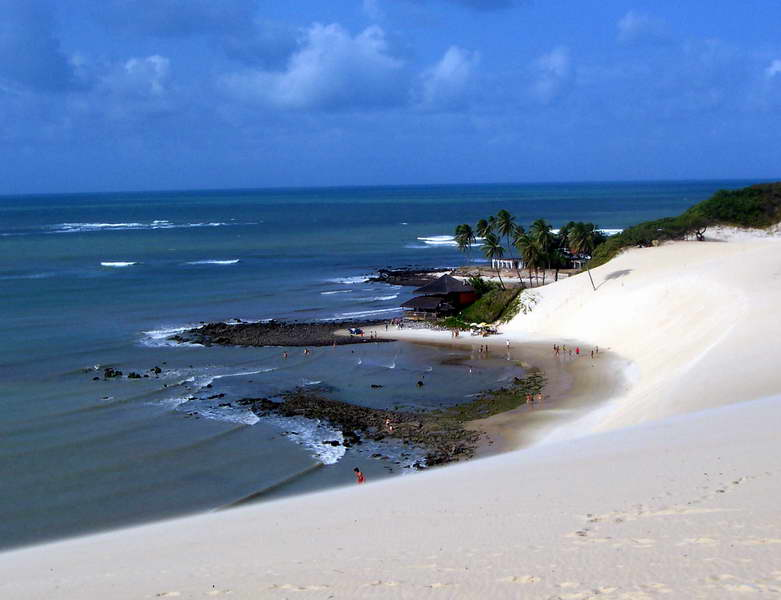
- Genipabu beach.

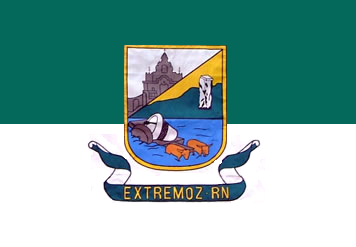
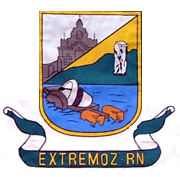
- Flag Coat of arms

- Location in Brazil
- Coordinates: 5°42′S 35°18′W
- Country: Brazil
- Region: Nordeste
- State: Rio Grande do Norte
- Mesoregion: Leste Potiguar

Population (2020)
  - Total: 28,936
- Time zone: UTC−3 (BRT)

Extremoz is a municipality in the state of Rio Grande do Norte in the Northeast region of Brazil.

== See also ==
- List of municipalities in Rio Grande do Norte
- The Portuguese version of this page
