= Potiguara =

Indigenous Tupi people of northeastern Brazil

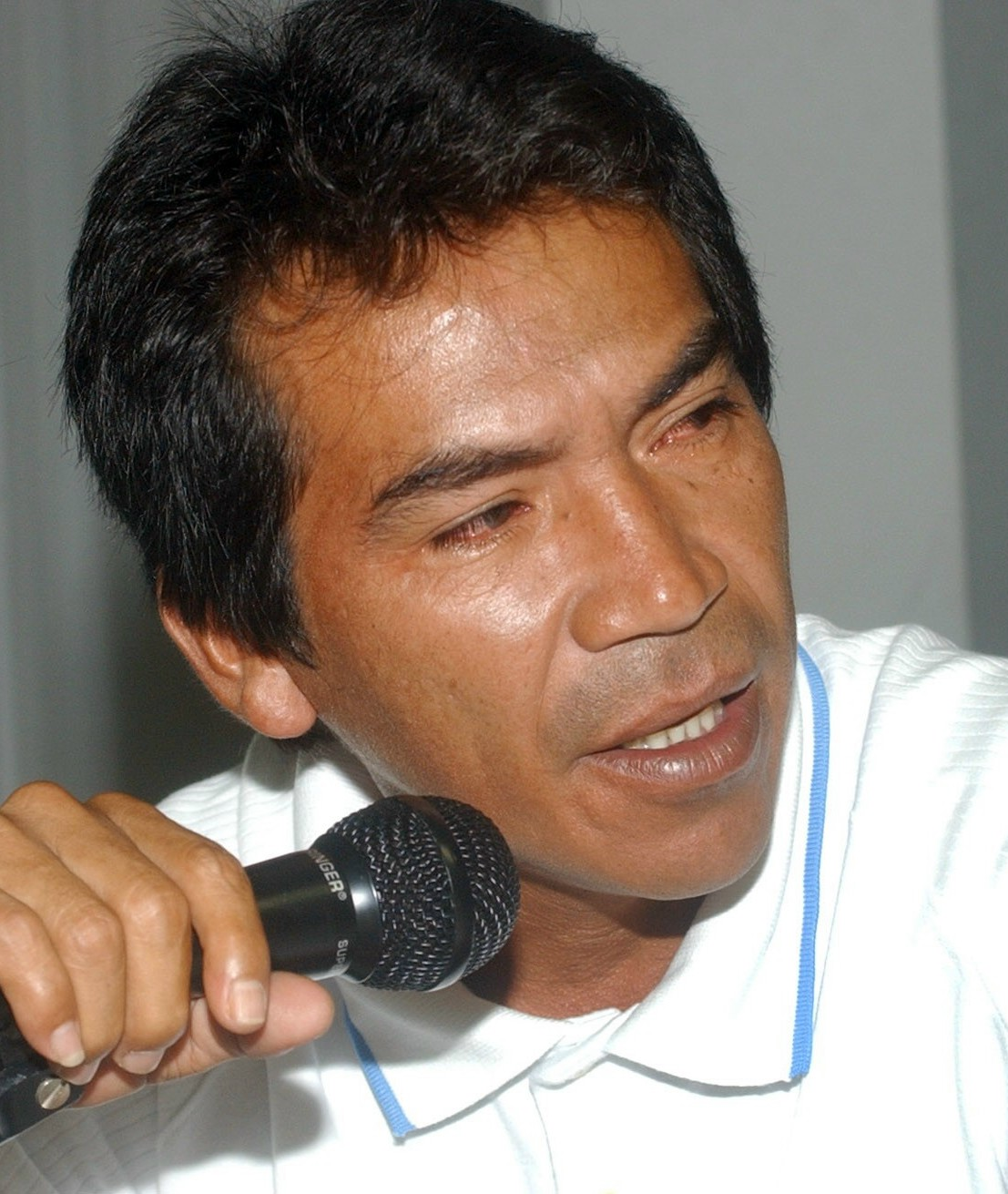
- Antonio Pessoa Gomes, the "Caboquinho", chief of Potiguara Indians.

Total population
- 16,095

Regions with significant populations
- Brazil

Languages
- Portuguese, Potiguara

The Potiguara (also Potyguara or Pitiguara) are an Indigenous people of Brazil. The Potiguara people live in Paraíba, in the municipalities of Marcação, Baía da Traição and Rio Tinto. Their population numbers sixteen thousand individuals, who occupy 26 villages in 3 reservations (Terras Indígenas): Potiguara, Jacaré de São Domingos e Potiguara de Monte-Mor. Their name, Potiguara, means "shrimp-eaters", from poty, "shrimp", and uara, "eater", according to Brazilian writer José de Alencar.

== History ==
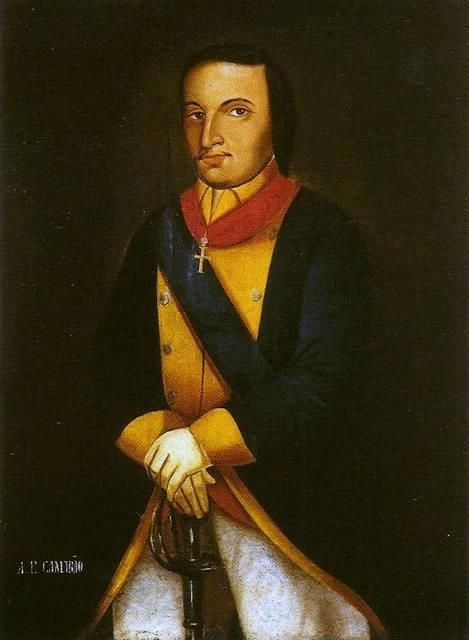
17th century portrait of António Filipe Camarão

According to José de Alencar, the Potiguara were allies of the Portuguese during Brazil's colonial period, especially during the Dutch invasions in Brazil. António Filipe Camarão, a chief of the Potiguara in the seventeenth century was rewarded with a noble title and membership in the prestigious Order of Christ for his loyal service to the crown against the Dutch invaders in Brazil. Indigenous peoples were recruited as allies on both sides of the conflict in which ultimately the Dutch were defeated and expelled.

== Notable people ==
- Filipe Camarão, soldier who served in the Dutch–Portuguese War on the side of Portugal
- Clara Camarão, Filipe's wife who also served during the war
