= Taipu, Rio Grande do Norte =

Municipality in Rio Grande do Norte, Brazil

Taipu
- Municipality
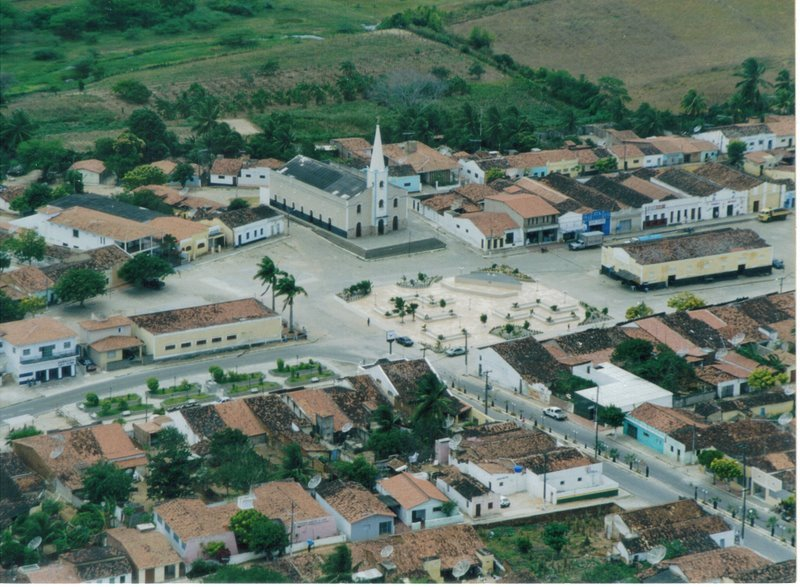

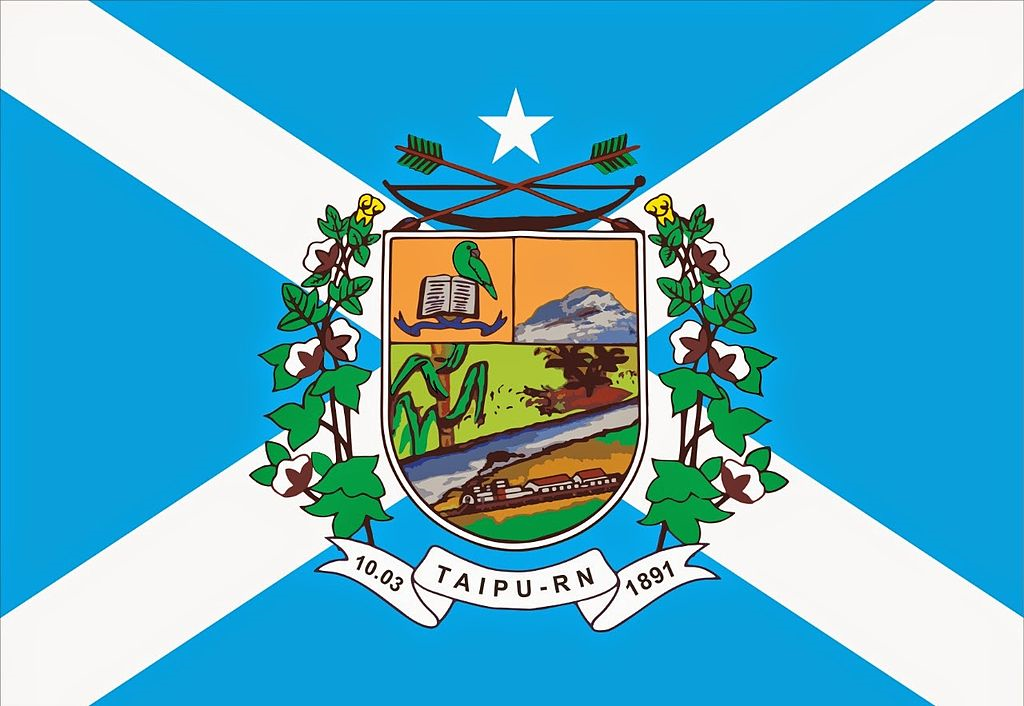
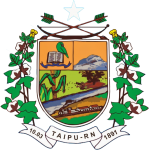
- Flag Coat of arms

- Location in Rio Grande do Norte state

- Location in Brazil
- Coordinates: 05°37′19″S 35°35′49″W
- Country: Brazil
- Region: Northeast
- State: Rio Grande do Norte

Area
  - Total: 353 km^{2} (136 sq mi)

Population (2020)
  - Total: 12,297
  - Density: 34.8/km^{2} (90.2/sq mi)
- Time zone: UTC−3 (BRT)

Taipu is a municipality (município) in the Brazilian state of Rio Grande do Norte. As of 2020, IBGE estimated a population of 12,297 inhabitants. The municipality covers a total area of 353 km^{2}.
