= Ielmo Marinho =

Municipality in Rio Grande do Norte, Brazil

Coordinates: 5°49′S 35°33′W

- Municipality
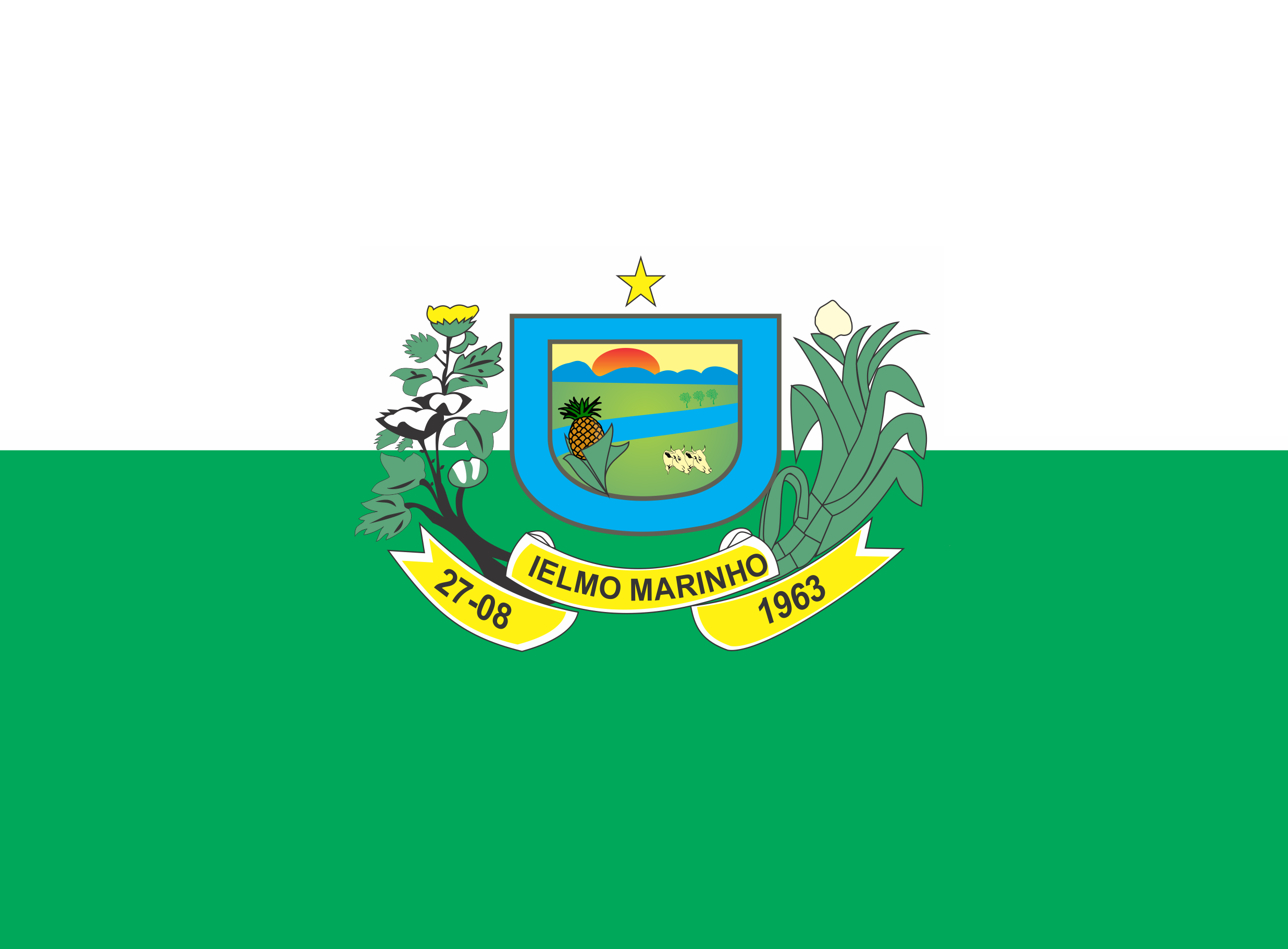
- Flag Coat of arms
- Interactive map of Ielmo Marinho
- Country: Brazil
- Region: Nordeste
- State: Rio Grande do Norte
- Mesoregion: Agreste Potiguar

Population (2020)
  - Total: 13,901
- Time zone: UTC−3 (BRT)

Ielmo Marinho is a municipality in the state of Rio Grande do Norte in the Northeast region of Brazil.

== See also ==
- List of municipalities in Rio Grande do Norte
