= Mossoró =

Municipality in Rio Grande do Norte, Brazil

- Municipality
- The Municipality of Mossoró
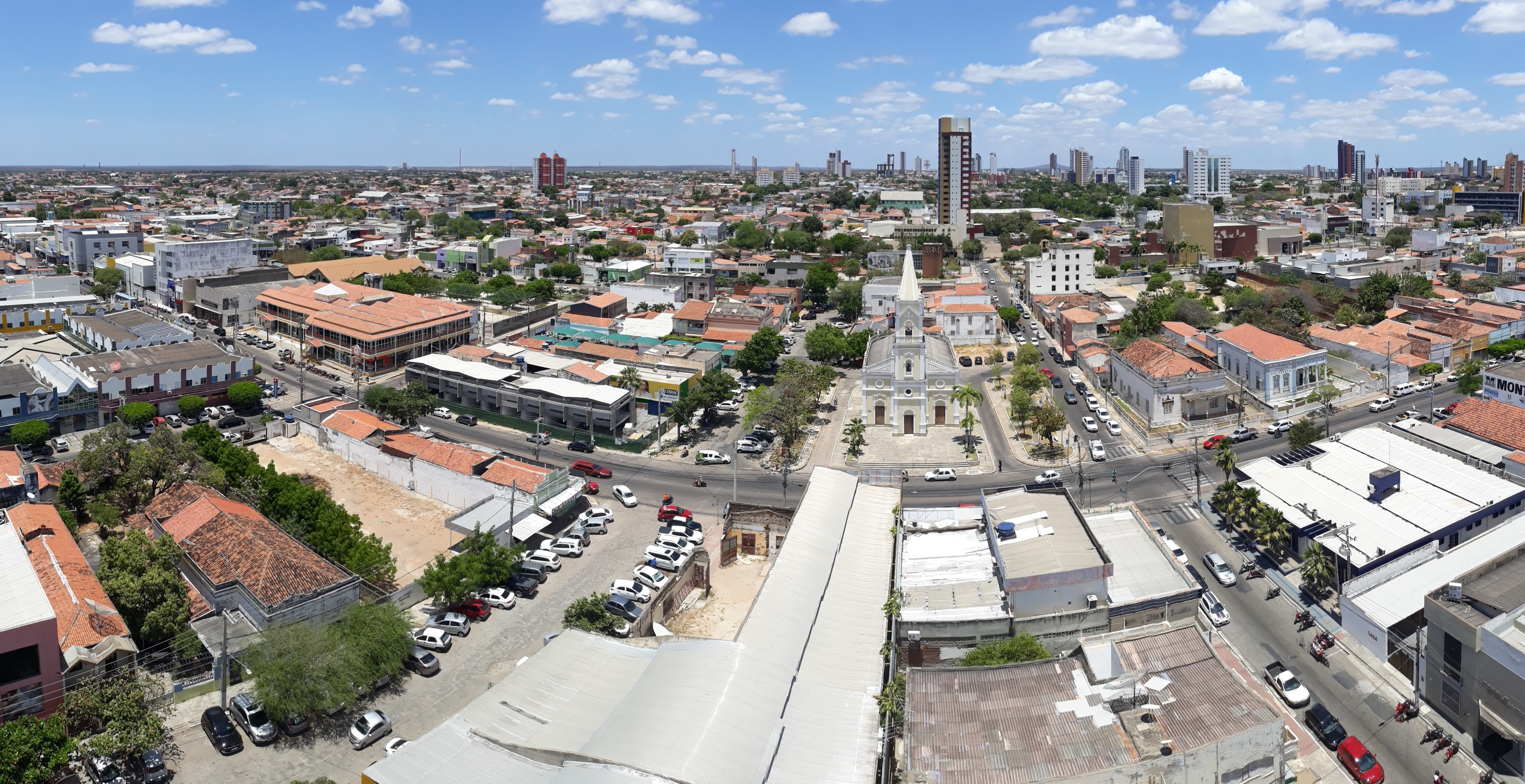
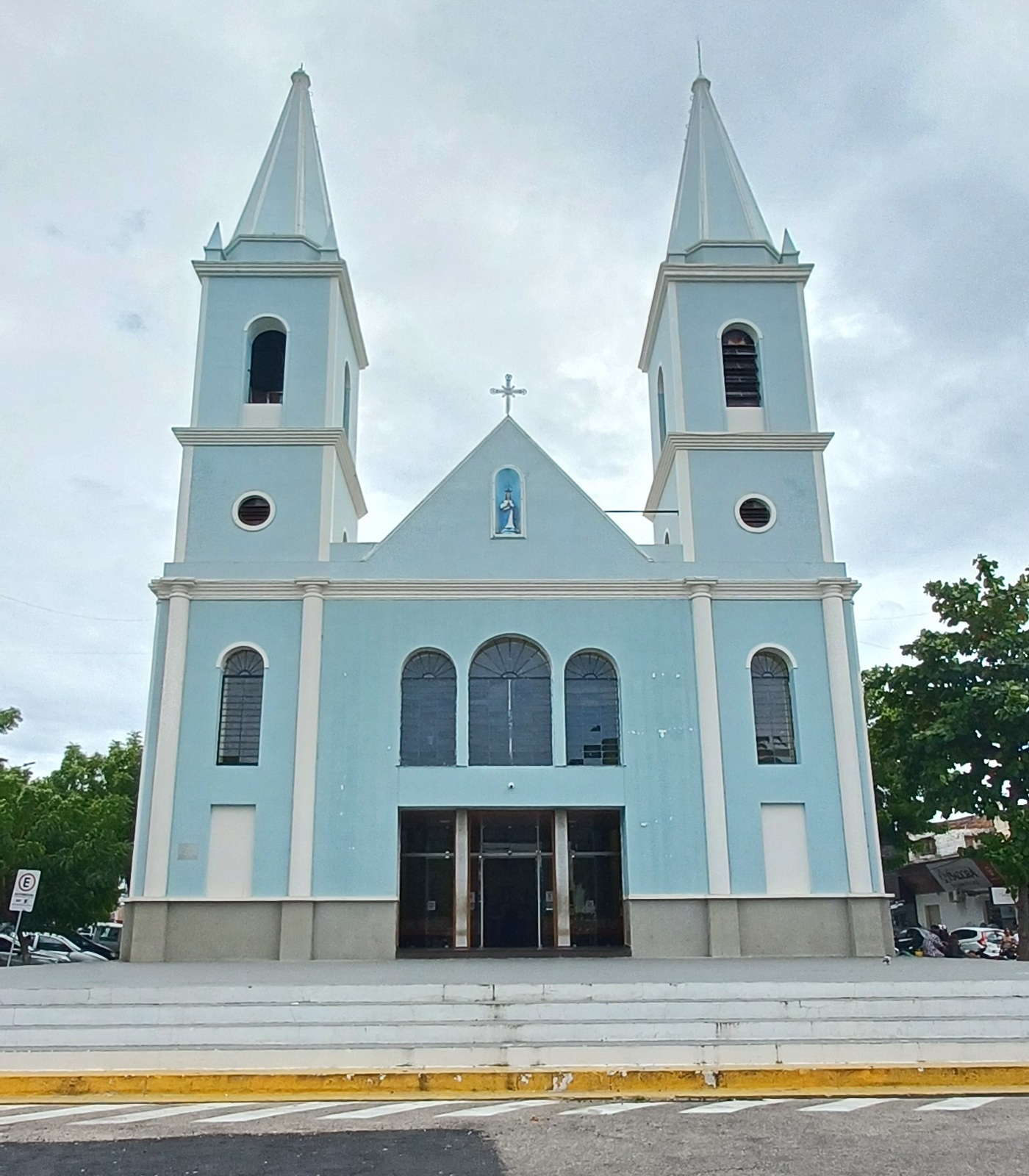
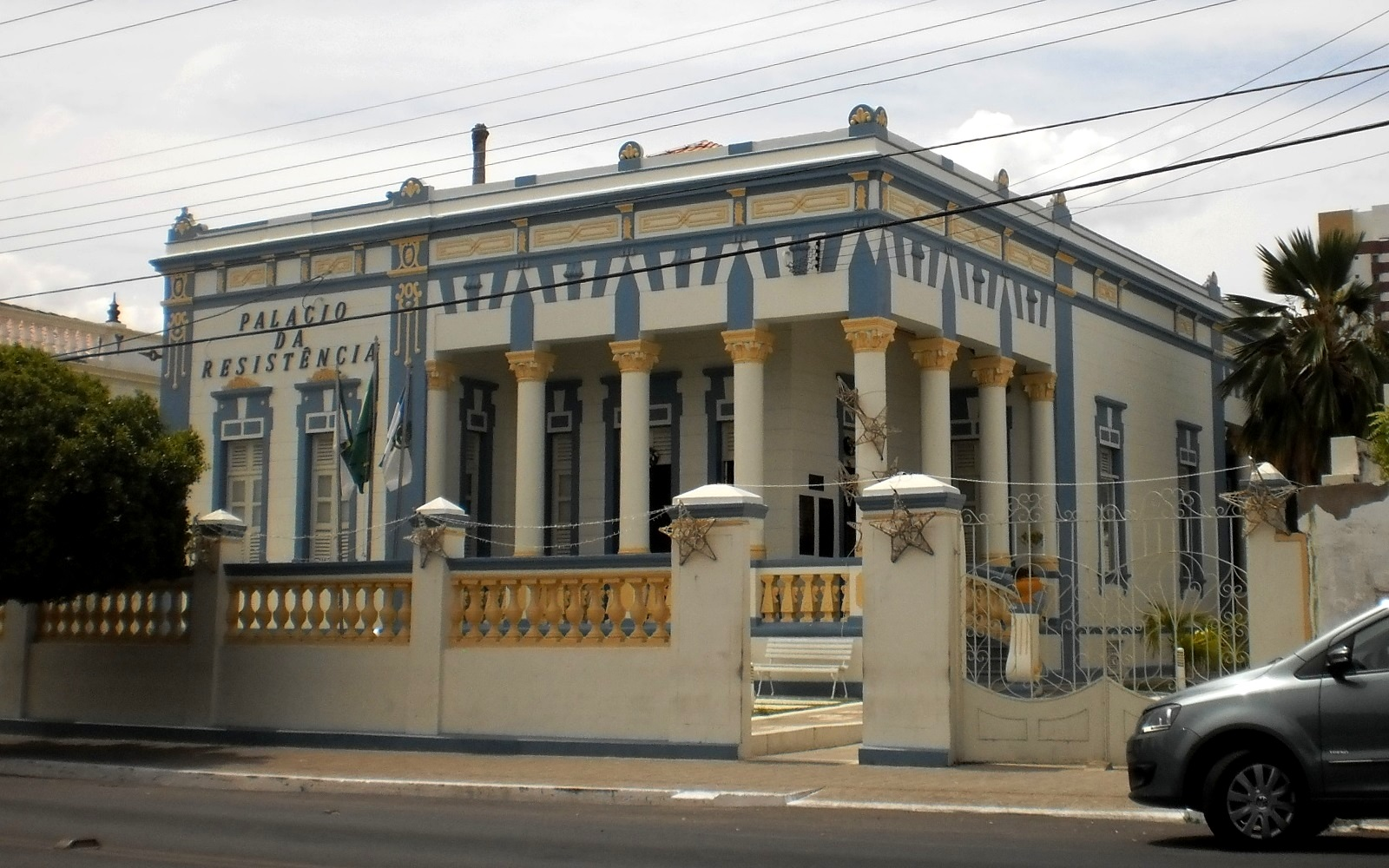
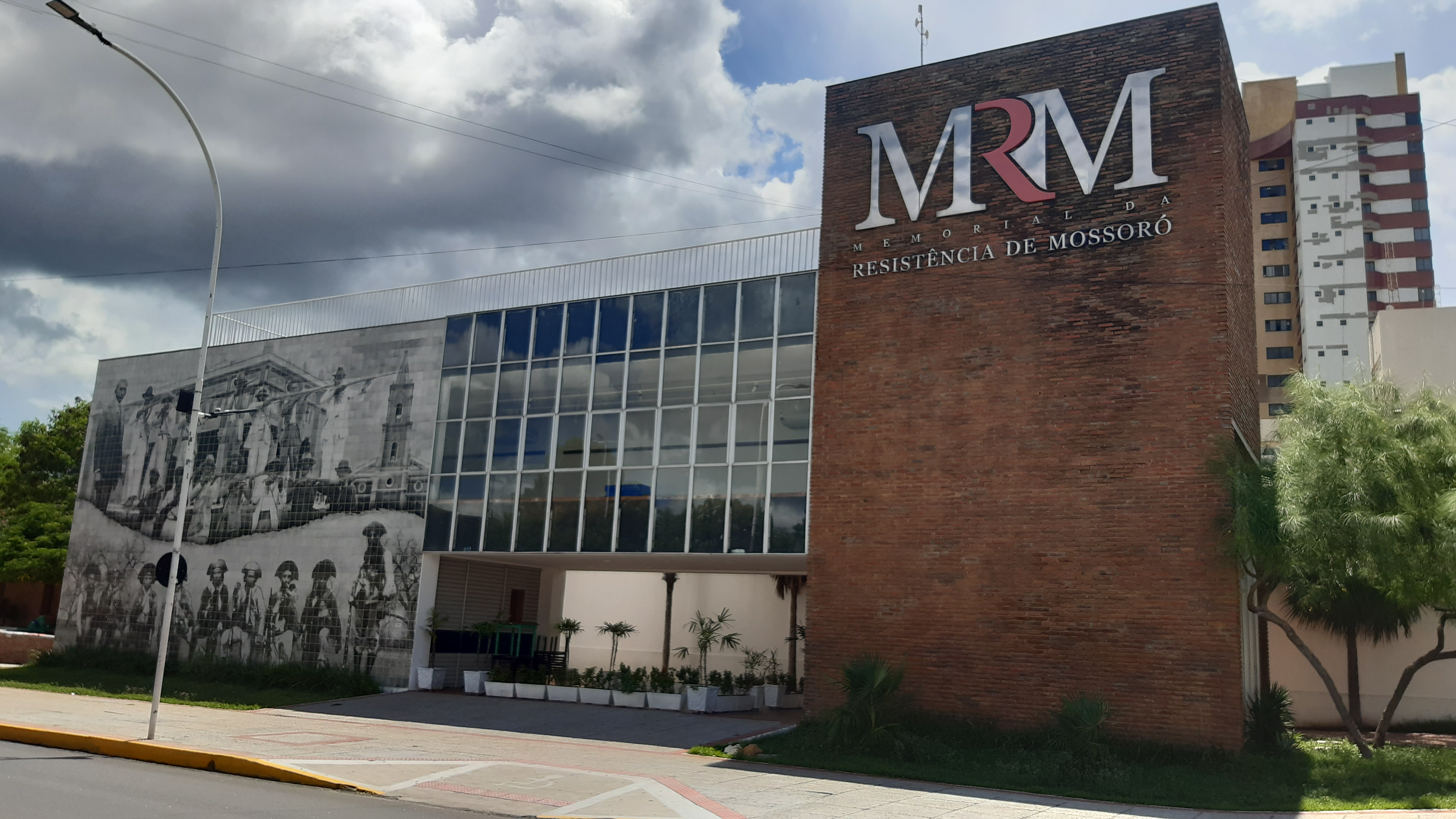
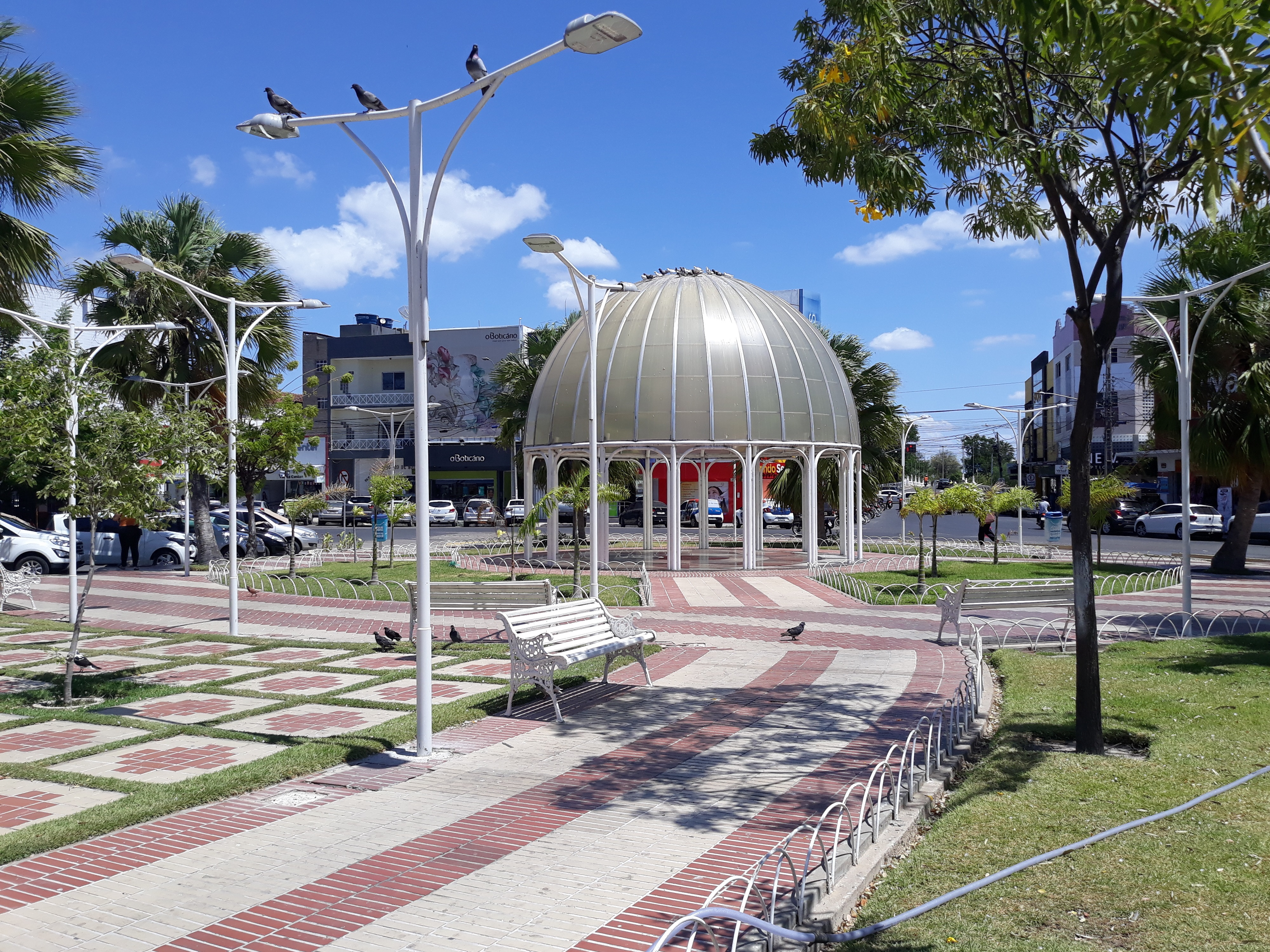
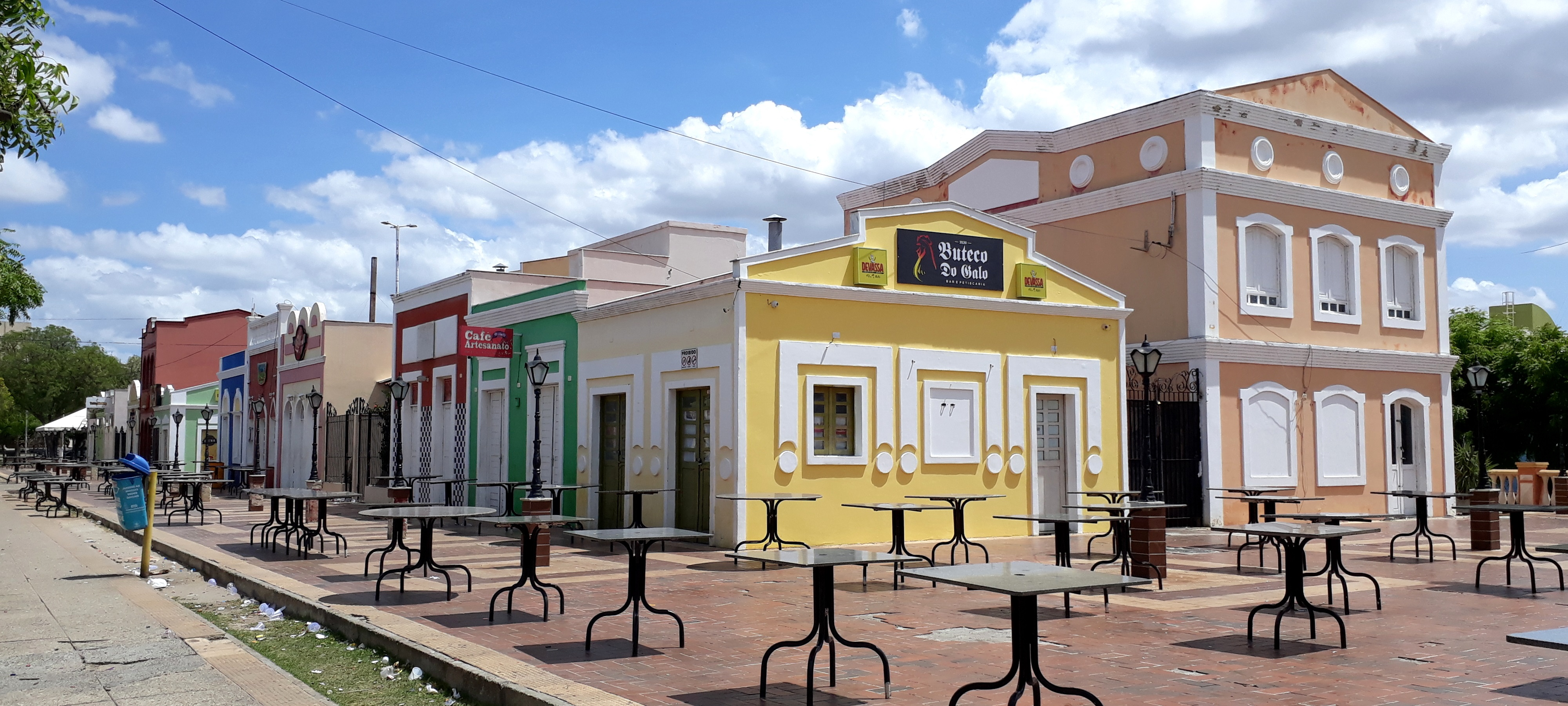
- Skyline of Mossoró Cathedral of Saint Lucy Palace of Resistance (City Hall) Resistance Memorial Rodolfo Fernandes Square Community Square

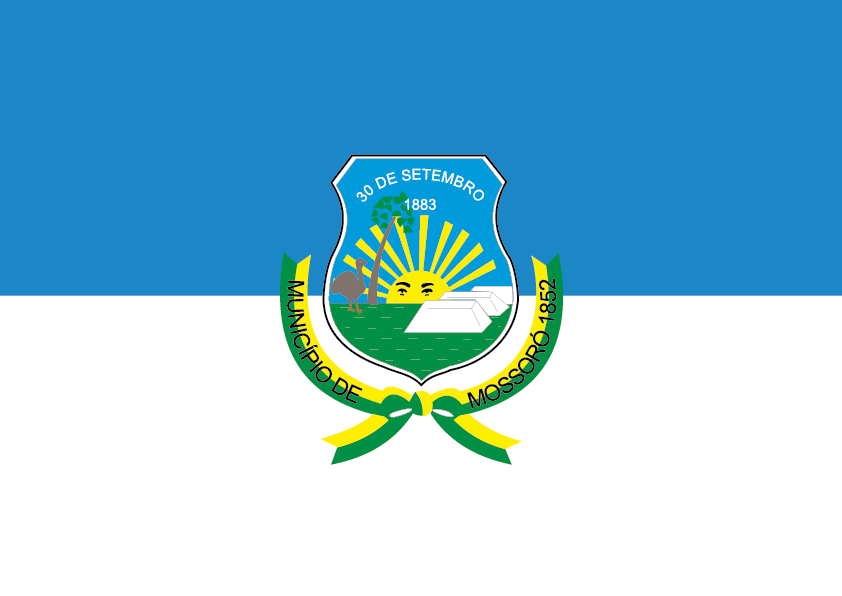
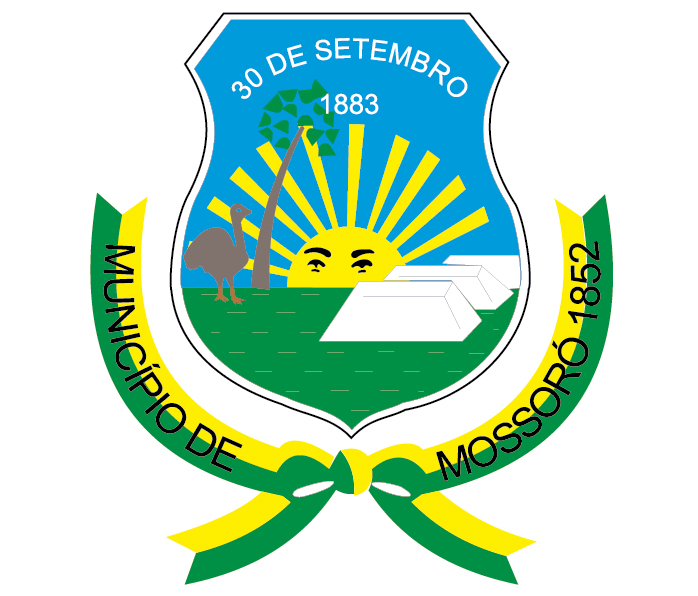
- Flag Coat of arms
- Nicknames: "Capital do Oeste" ("The Capital of the West") and "Cidade do Sal e do Petróleo" ("City of Salt and Petroleum")
- Anthem

- Location within Brazil Location within South America
- Coordinates: 5°11′16″S 37°20′38″W
- Country: Brazil
- Region: Northeast
- State: Rio Grande do Norte
- Founded: 1852

Government
  - Mayor: Allyson Leandro Bezerra Silva (União Brasil)

Area
  - Municipality: 2,099.334 km^{2} (810.557 sq mi)
  - Urban (EMBRAPA/2015): 74.031 km^{2} (28.584 sq mi)
- Elevation: 67 m (220 ft)

Population (2022)
  - Municipality: 264,577
  - Rank: 2nd in RN
  - Density: 126.029/km^{2} (326.414/sq mi)

Economy
  - GDP (IBGE/2021): R$ 8,071,762,200
  - GDP per capita (IBGE/2021): R$ 26,570.03

Human Development UNDP/2010
  - HDI: 0.720
  - HDI rank: 3rd in RN
  - Gini (2020): 0.52
- Time zone: UTC-3 (BRT)
- Postal code: 59600-000 to 59649-999
- Climate: Semi-arid
- Climate classification: BSh
- Patron saint: Saint Lucy
- Demonym: Mossoroense
- Website: www.prefeiturademossoro.com.br

Mossoró (Portuguese pronunciation: [mosoˈɾɔ]) is a Brazilian municipality in the interior of the state of Rio Grande do Norte, recognized as the capital of the Brazilian semi-arid region. Covering an area of approximately 2,100 square kilometres (810 sq mi), it is the largest municipality in the state by area, located 281 kilometers from the state capital, Natal. With a population of 264,577 inhabitants according to the 2022 demographic census, it ranks as the second most populous city in Rio Grande do Norte, after the capital, the most populous in the state's interior, and the 108th in Brazil.

Situated between two state capitals, Natal and Fortaleza, both connected by the BR-304 highway that bypasses the municipality, Mossoró is one of the main cities in the Northeast's interior and is experiencing significant economic and infrastructural growth. It is one of the most attractive cities in Brazil for investments. The municipality is one of Brazil's largest producers of onshore oil, and its economy is notably driven by irrigated horticulture, largely oriented toward export.

Emancipated from Assu in 1852, the municipality's history is marked by significant events, including the abolition of slavery in 1883, five years before the Lei Áurea, the first female vote in Brazil, and the historic resistance against the bandit group led by Lampião in 1927. A cultural hub of Rio Grande do Norte, Mossoró is also prominent in business tourism. Annual festivities attract numerous tourists, such as the Mossoró Cidade Junina, one of Brazil's largest June festivals, and the Auto da Liberdade, the country's largest open-air theatrical performance.

== Etymology ==
The origin of the name "Mossoró" remains uncertain, though several theories exist. One suggests it derives from "Monxoró," the name attributed to the indigenous people who first inhabited the region. Another theory posits that it comes from "Mororó," a resilient and flexible tree.

According to current Portuguese orthography rules, the correct spelling is Moçoró, as the letter "ç" is used for words of Tupi origin. The name, which comes from Tupi, means erosion, cut, or rupture. Over time, the spelling evolved from mo-so-'roka to mossoró and finally to moçoró. The term moçoroense, referring to the municipality's residents, derives from the same root.

== History ==
=== Origins ===
Around 1600, references to salt pans in the region suggest the initial settlement of what is now Mossoró. According to Luís da Câmara Cascudo, a historian from Rio Grande do Norte, Dutchmen Gedeon Morris de Jonge and Elbert Smiente extracted salt from the area until around 1644.

In 1701, Fernando Martins Mascarenhas, governor of Pernambuco, granted lands in Paneminha to the Carmo Convent in Recife, including sesmarias that remain part of Mossoró today. Additional lands were gradually allocated to Brazilians and Portuguese. During the 18th century, farms were established along a river by landowners from other regions. The population was primarily composed of cowboys, breeders, and farm managers, as landowners typically resided elsewhere, such as in Natal or neighboring provinces such as Paraíba and Ceará. The first permanent settlers are believed to have been the Gamboa, Guilherme, and Ausentes families, who lived along the Mossoró River and gradually spread to areas as far as Apodi.

In the mid-18th century, around 1760, Portuguese sergeant-major Antônio de Souza Machado and his family relocated to the area, aiming to populate it. He owned the Santa Luzia farm and ordered the construction of the Santa Luzia chapel, a foundational milestone for Mossoró, officially established on August 5, 1772.

=== 19th Century ===
On October 27, 1842, by provincial resolution no. 87, the district of Mossoró was created as part of the municipality of Assu, and the parish of Santa Luzia was separated from Apodi, with the chapel elevated to the status of parish church. Until the appointment of its first vicar, Priest Antônio Joaquim Rodrigues, in 1844, the new parish was led on an interim basis by Father José Antônio Lopes da Silveira. On March 15, 1852, provincial law no. 246 separated the district and elevated Mossoró to the category of a village, making it a new municipality of Rio Grande do Norte. On March 23 of the same year, the district of São Sebastião was created, today the municipality of Governador Dix-Sept Rosado. Still that year, the first elections for the Municipal Council were held, which was formally inaugurated on January 24, 1853, presided over by Father Antônio Freire de Carvalho. In 1855, Priest Antônio Joaquim, parish vicar of Mossoró, created the Brotherhood of Santa Luzia, and starting in 1858, the chapel was demolished and rebuilt over the next ten years.

By provincial law no. 499 of May 23, 1861, the District Court of Mossoró was created, separated from the Court of Assu. Finally, on November 9, 1870, provincial law no. 620 elevated the village of Mossoró to the status of a city. In 1872, the first demographic census of Brazil was conducted, and Mossoró ranked fourteenth among the 22 municipalities of the province, with exactly 8,000 inhabitants, of whom 293 were enslaved people. On October 17 of that same year, the journalist Jeremias da Rocha Nogueira founded the newspaper O Mossoroense, and on December 5, the district of Areia Branca was created (today corresponding to the territories of Areia Branca, Grossos, and Tibau), but it was extinguished on December 19, 1876. On August 18, 1873, the Municipal Council authorized the construction of the city’s first cemetery, now known as São Sebastião Cemetery. In that same year, the Masonic lodge of Mossoró was founded.

On August 30, 1875, at the headquarters of O Mossoroense, around three hundred women, led by Anna Floriano, took to the streets in protest against the mandatory military draft. They held the district clerk hostage and publicly tore up the recruitment book and papers that forced Mossoró’s men to join the armed forces to fight in the Paraguayan War. Between 1877 and 1879, the Northeast suffered a severe drought that caused a mass exodus from the city to coastal areas—including most of the enslaved population—and in 1878, the city’s public jail was built.

In 1882, an abolitionist movement began with the goal of ending slavery in Mossoró, resulting in the founding of the Mossoroense Liberation Society on January 6, 1883. That year, only 86 enslaved people remained, forty of whom were freed by manumission in June, at the Masonic lodge. Effective abolition took place on September 30, 1883, and the city began to receive many fugitive enslaved people from other towns.

On June 1, 1886, the district of São Sebastião was extinguished and then reinstated on April 2, 1887, the same year the first postal and telegraph agency was created. After the fall of the monarchy and the Proclamation of the Republic on November 15, 1889, the government of Rio Grande do Norte issued a decree dissolving the Mossoró City Council and creating a municipal intendency, which took effect on January 18, 1890. On November 22 of the same year, the district of Areia Branca was reinstated by decree, becoming a municipality on February 16, 1892.

=== 1900 to 1926 ===
After the creation of Mossoró’s first secondary school on September 7, 1900, the bishop of the Diocese of Paraíba, Adauto Aurélio de Miranda Henriques, founded the Santa Luzia Gymnasium (now Santa Luzia Diocesan College) on March 2, 1901, appointing Canon Estevam Dantas, the parish vicar, as its first director. The school was closed by the diocese in 1908 and reopened only in 1912, when Rio Grande do Norte came under the newly created Diocese of Natal (December 1909).

On September 30, 1904, during the celebration of 21 years since abolition in Mossoró, the Monument of Liberty was inaugurated in what is today Redemption Square. On November 15, 1908, the state government created the September 30 School Group, opened on May 12 of the following year. Earlier, on December 12, 1908, Mossoró gained its first movie theater, the Almeida Castro Cinema, which operated inside the Grande Hotel.

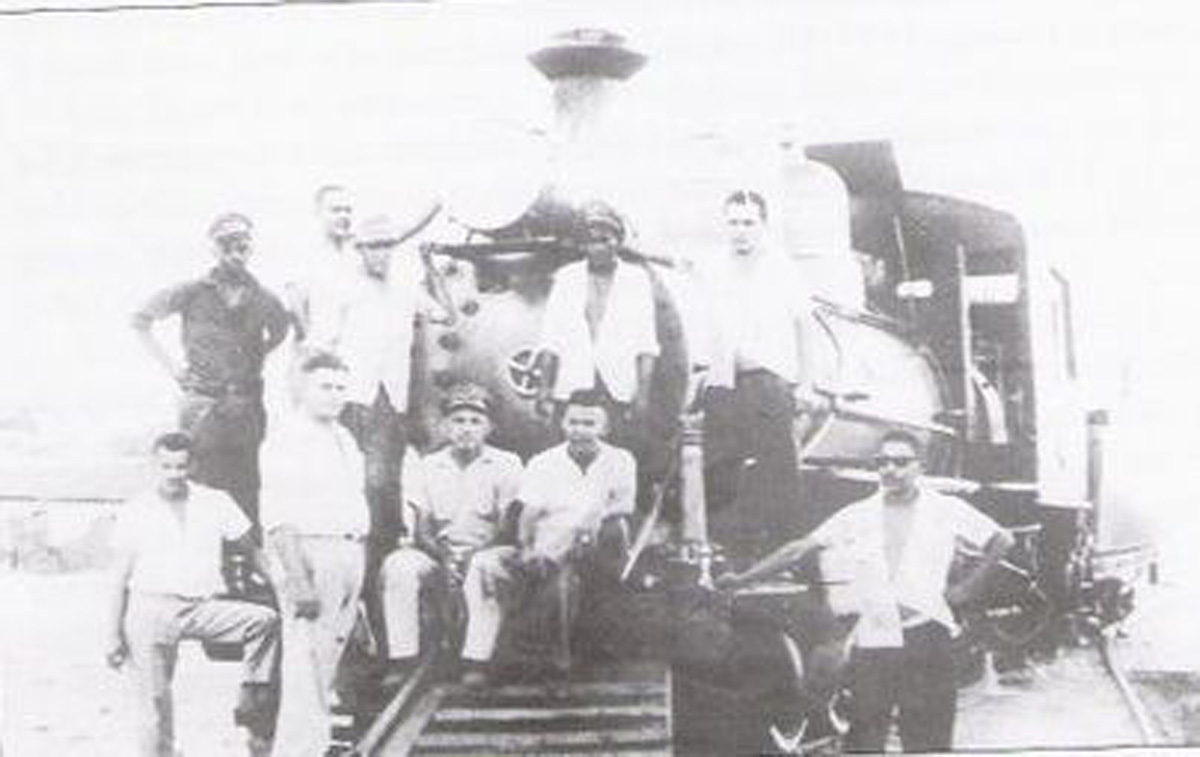
First locomotive of the Mossoró-Porto Franco Railroad, in 1915

In 1912, another cinema — Politeama — arrived in the city, one year after opening in Natal, and the Franciscan sisters founded the Sacred Heart of Mary School on August 2. On September 13, 1913, nearly thirty years after abolition, the Mossoró intendency declared September 30 a municipal holiday. In 1914, the new public slaughterhouse was inaugurated and the city’s first urban plan was drafted by engineer Henrique de Novaes. In 1915, during yet another great drought, the Mossoró–Porto Franco Railway (today Areia Branca) began operating, and on December 19, 1916, the Mossoró Electric Power and Improvements Company (Empresa Força e Luz e Melhoramentos de Mossoró) was founded, bringing electric lighting to the entire city, which replaced kerosene lamps. After its cornerstone was laid in October 1915, the Church of São Vicente was inaugurated in July 1919.

On January 19, 1922, by state decree, the Mossoró Primary Normal School was created (today Escola Estadual Jerônimo Rosado), inaugurated a month and a half later, on March 2. On September 7 of the same year, during the celebration of Brazil’s first centennial of independence, the Market Square was renamed Independence Square, and an obelisk was placed at its center. On July 23, 1926, the diocesan bishop of Natal, Dom José Pereira Alves, created the Parish of the Sacred Heart of Jesus, officially installed on August 1. The chapel, later elevated to parish church, had been built between 1904 and 1907.

=== Resistance to Lampião's gang and the first female vote ===
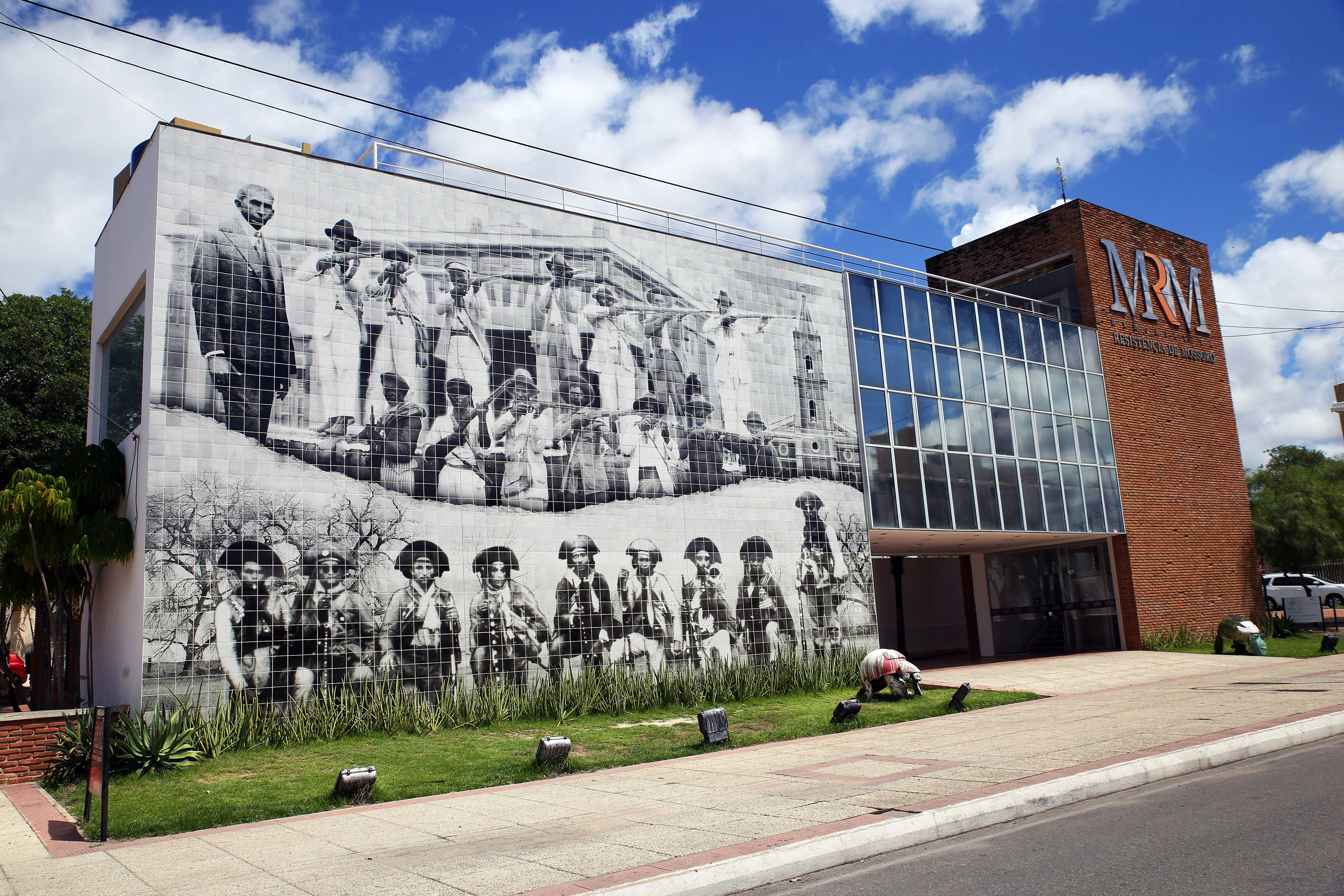
Main building of the Memorial to the Resistance of Mossoró, a museum featuring exhibitions on the 1927 invasion by Lampião's gang

Another significant act of resistance in Mossoró occurred in 1927, when the city stood against the gang of the Northeast's most infamous cangaceiro, Virgulino Ferreira da Silva, popularly known as "Lampião." That year, Mossoró was experiencing notable economic growth in commerce and industry. The gang entered Rio Grande do Norte through the municipality of Luís Gomes between June 9 and 10, passing through several cities in western Rio Grande do Norte before reaching Mossoró, where Lampião suffered his only defeat since becoming a cangaceiro.

On June 12, the cangaceiro and his companions arrived in the district of São Sebastião, now the municipality of Governador Dix-Sept Rosado, then a district of Mossoró. From there, he sent a telegram warning the population of an impending attack, causing widespread panic. Mayor Rodolfo Fernandes organized an exodus, setting up trenches to repel the invaders.

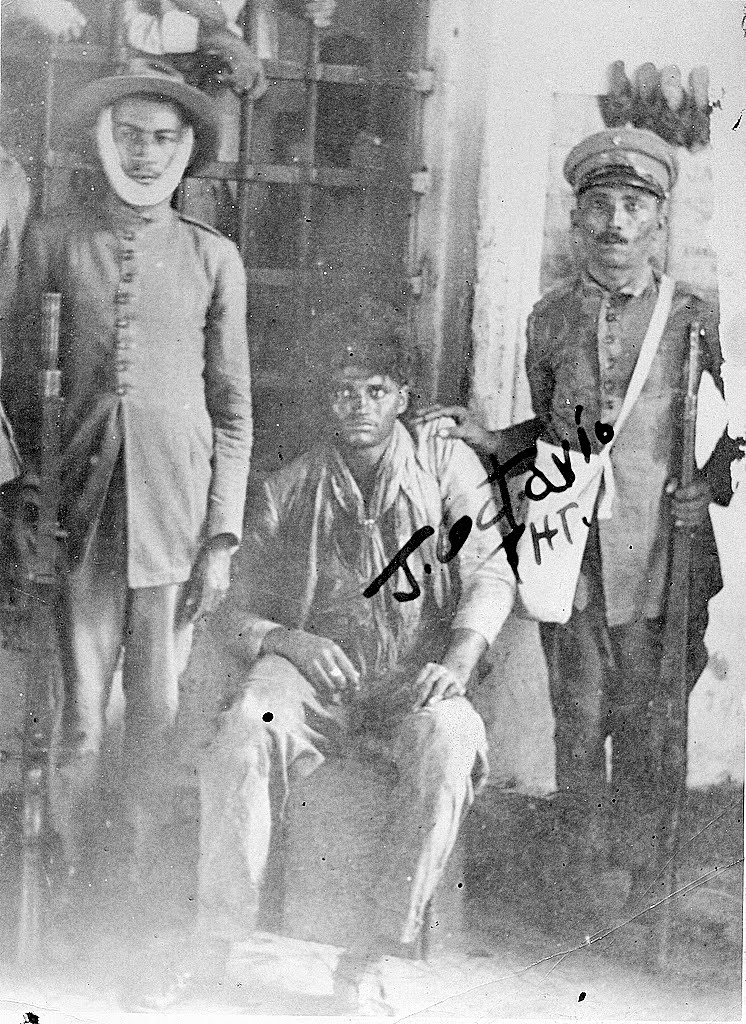
Jararaca, one of Lampião's cangaceiros, captured and surrounded by two military police soldiers

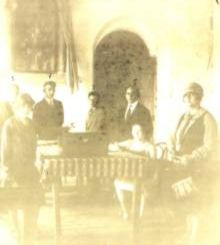
Celina Guimarães Viana, the first woman from Mossoró to obtain a voter's card, casting her vote at what is now the Mossoró Municipal Library in 1928

On June 13, Lampião and his gang reached Sítio Saco, where he sent a note demanding 400 réis in money to spare the city, a demand rejected by the mayor. The attack on Mossoró began at 4 p.m., with the gang leader dividing his cangaceiros into three groups, each targeting a different location: the first attacked the mayor's house; the second invaded and attacked the Mossoró railway station; and the third targeted what is now the São Sebastião Cemetery. An hour later, the gang retreated, leaving behind Colchete (killed during the confrontation) and Jararaca, who was wounded, captured, and killed days later. Jararaca was buried in the same cemetery attacked by the gang and later became a figure of local reverence among the people of Mossoró.

The following year, Mossoró made history again as the site of Brazil's first female vote, a globally significant event, as most countries still prohibited women from voting. At the time, the Brazilian Constitution, enacted in 1891, granted voting rights only to the wealthy. Women, slaves, the illiterate, and the poor were excluded. In 1928, Celina Guimarães Viana, a teacher and football referee, obtained the first female voter's card and cast the first female vote in Brazil. This inspired women in Rio Grande do Norte and nine other Brazilian states to organize street protests demanding voting rights, which had already been secured in Rio Grande do Norte. Women nationwide gained the right to vote six years later, in 1934, under President Getúlio Vargas.

=== From 1929 to the 1970s ===
On January 1, 1929, Rafael Fernandes Gurjão took office as Mossoró’s first constitutional mayor, elected on September 2 the previous year. He held office for only three months, until April 2, when his vice-mayor, Vicente Carlos Saboia Filho, took over. He was deposed on October 8, 1930, when all mayors in the state were removed by decree.

On July 28, 1934, by the papal bull Pro Eclesiarum Omnium issued by Pope Pius XI the Diocese of Mossoró was created, separated from the Diocese of Natal and subordinate to the Archdiocese of Paraíba. However, the news only reached Mossoró on September 14, when the parish vicar of Saint Lucy, Priest Luiz Ferreira da Cunha Mota, received a telegram from the bishop of Natal, Dom Marcolino Esmeraldo de Souza Dantas, who had been appointed apostolic administrator of the new diocese. The diocese was officially installed on November 18, 1934.

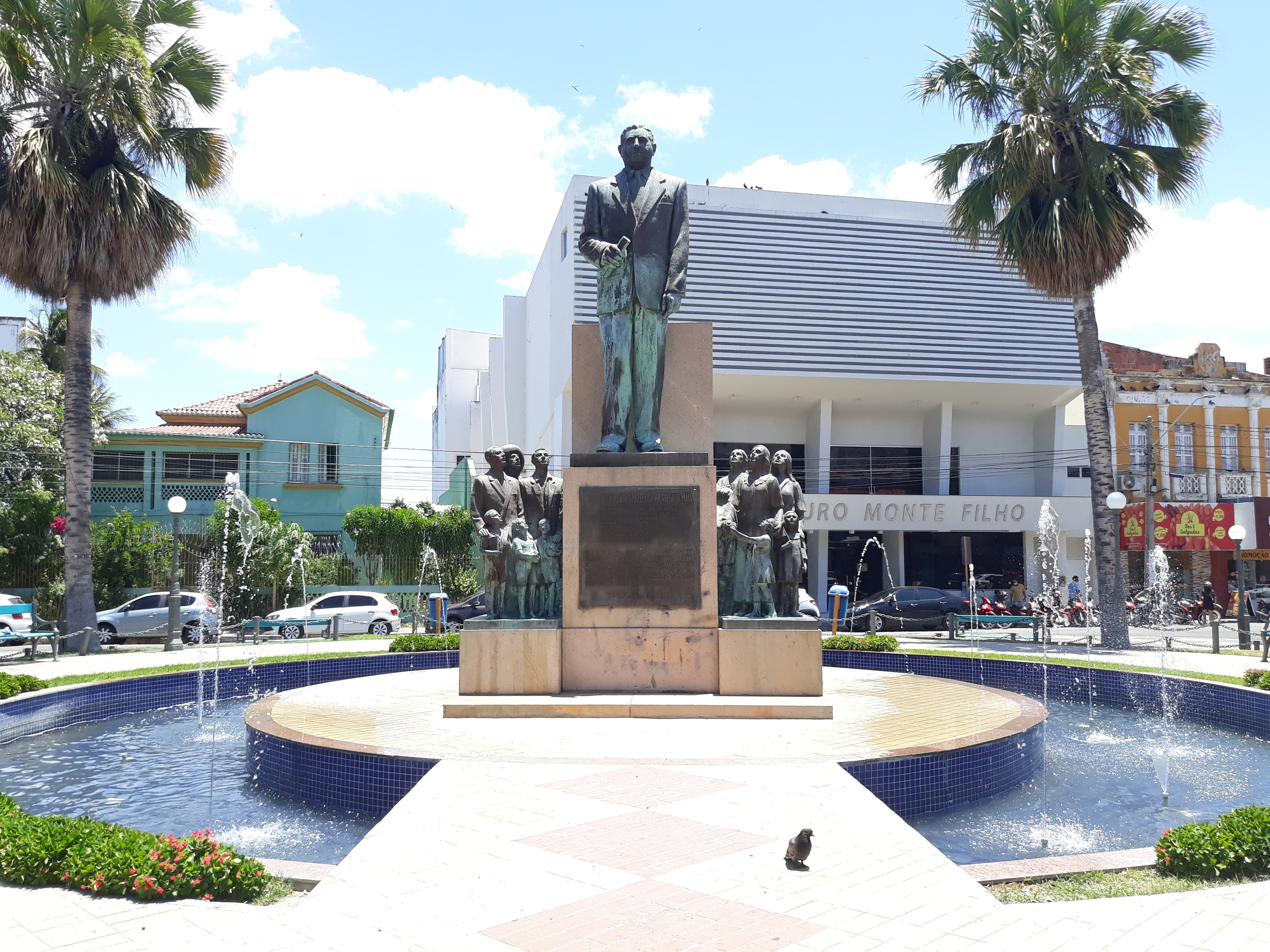
Statue of Dix-Sept Rosado in Vigário Antônio Joaquim Square, in the center of Mossoró

On January 23, 1943, Mossoró inaugurated Cine Pax, located across from Rodolfo Fernandes Square, operating on the upper floor of the home of its owner, businessman Jorge Pinto. The cinema opened with the screening of Belle Starr. Another cinema, Cine Déa, opened in 1944. By the 1960s, at least seven cinemas had opened in the city, including Cine Cid, across from the Vicar Antonio Joaquim Square, inaugurated on July 22, 1964, with the film Rome Adventure.

In 1948, Mossoró held direct elections for mayor again, with the candidate Jerônimo Dix-Sept Rosado Maia winning. He remained in office until 1950, when he was elected governor of Rio Grande do Norte, taking office in 1951. He governed the state until July 12, 1951, when, as a result of an air disaster, he died in Aracaju, the capital of Sergipe. In his honor, on the 25th of that month, a municipal law changed the name of the district of Sebastianópolis, formerly the village of São Sebastião, to Governador Dix-Sept Rosado, which became a municipality on April 4, 1963, through state law 2878.

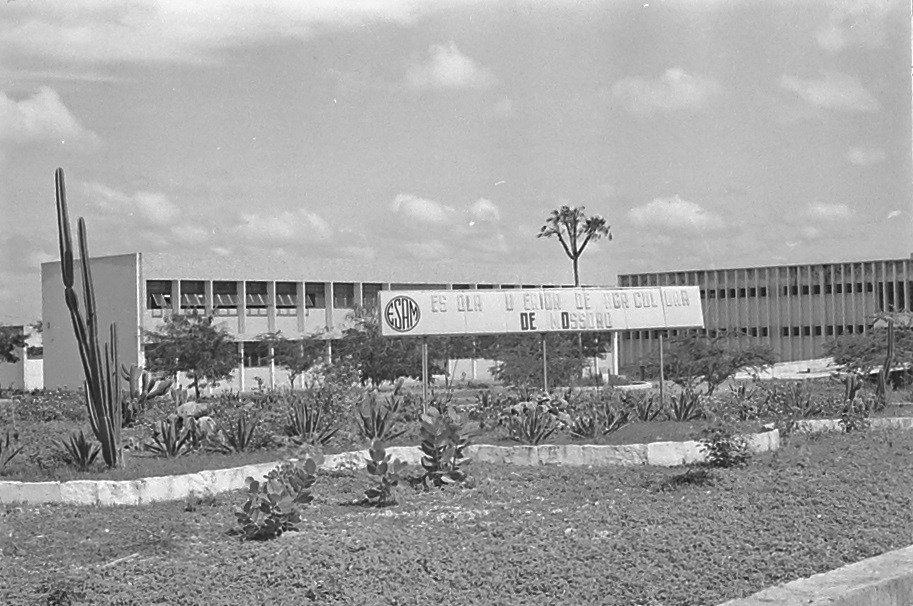
Mossoró Higher School of Agriculture (ESAM) in the year 1974

On March 29, 1964, the diocesan bishop Dom Gentil Diniz Barreto dissolved the Parish of the Sacred Heart of Jesus and elevated the São Manoel Church to parish status. The Sacred Heart Church became a sanctuary of perpetual adoration and was incorporated into the Santa Luzia parish. On April 18, 1967, Mayor Raimundo Soares de Souza created the Mossoró Higher School of Agriculture (ESAM), which was inaugurated eight months later, on December 22. Its first admissions exam was held the following year, and its first agronomy class graduated in 1971.

In 1970, when the municipality had a population of 97,245 inhabitants, Mossoró’s industrial district was established, and in 1975 the Abolição neighborhood emerged, along with the city’s first master plan, which defined its first urban boundary. Three years later, the first oil well was discovered in Mossoró, at the site of the current Thermas Hotel. In 1980, the city expanded further with the creation of new neighborhoods, and the population reached 145,981.

=== 1980s to the present ===
On December 15, 1981, the district of Baraúna was separated and became a new municipality. During that decade, Mossoró became a hub of irrigated fruit production, particularly melons. Urban expansion and population growth continued, though at a slower pace than in previous decades. Meanwhile, railway transport declined, leading to the deactivation of the Mossoró–Sousa Railway and, in 1995, the dissolution of the Mossoró Railway Company.

In 1984, the Diocese of Mossoró celebrated its fiftieth anniversary, and Pope John Paul II proclaimed Saint Lucy the patron saint of the diocese. In 1985, the city was hit by heavy rains, and the Mossoró River recorded the largest flood in its history, inundating downtown and riverside neighborhoods. In 1986, more petroleum was discovered in the municipality, this time in the Canto do Amaro area along BR-110, making Mossoró the largest onshore petroleum producer in Brazil. In the 1988 elections, the city elected its first female mayor, Rosalba Ciarlini, who served until 1992. In 1990, five new neighborhoods were created, and the 1991 census recorded a population of 192,267 — growth that continued slowing compared to 1960–1980 rates.

Rosalba was succeeded by Dix-Huit Rosado, who had previously served two mayoral terms. On December 29, 1994, Mossoró inaugurated the Mossoró Decentralized Teaching Unit (ETFRN/UNED), which became the Federal Center for Technological Education (CEFET-RN) in 1999 and, in 2008, the Federal Institute of Rio Grande do Norte (IFRN). On October 22, 1996, Mayor Dix-Huit Rosado died in office and was succeeded by Sandra Rosado. In that year’s election, Rosalba was once again elected mayor. On September 24, 1999, the old Mossoró railway station was reopened as the Estação das Artes Elizeu Ventania, named after a local poet and repentista.

In the 2000 elections, Rosalba was elected for her third term. In 2004, the Dix-Huit Rosado Maia Municipal Theater was inaugurated at Cícero Dias Square. On July 29, 2005, 38 years after the founding of ESAM, it was transformed into the Federal Rural University of the Semi-arid Region (UFERSA) by federal law no. 11,155. In 2008, the Mossoró Resistance Memorial was inaugurated. In the 2012 elections, Cláudia Regina won, took office in 2013, but had her mandate definitively revoked in December that same year, being succeeded by the president of the Municipal Council, Silveira Júnior. In 2016, Rosalba Ciarlini was elected mayor for the fourth time. In 2017, Mossoró received the title of Capital of the Semi-Arid by federal law, and in 2018, a municipal law designated Vigário Antônio Joaquim Square as the city’s official ground zero. In the 2020 elections, Allyson Bezerra was elected mayor, and he was re-elected in 2024 with the largest number of votes in the city’s history.

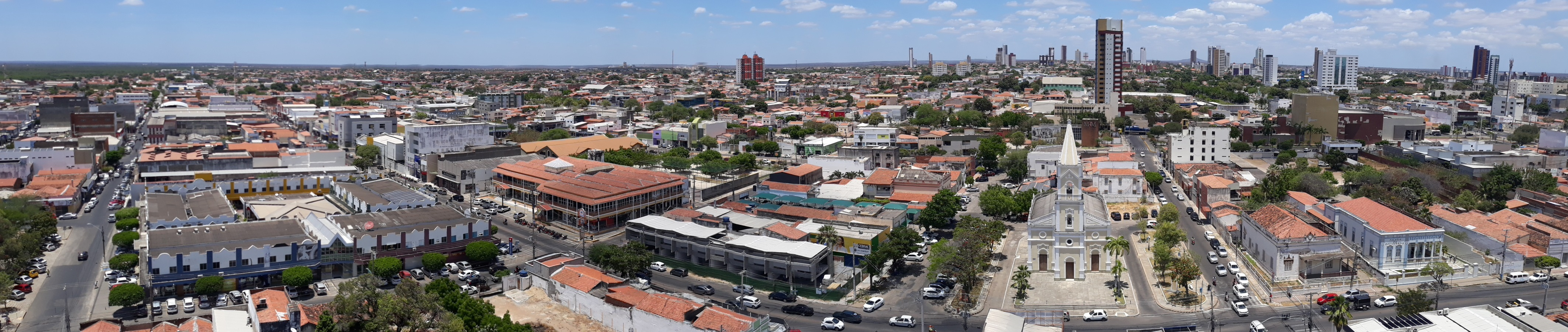
The city today, partially viewed from the Caiçara Business Center

== Geography ==
Map of Mossoró and surrounding areas, highlighting neighboring municipalities and geographic features.

According to the regional division established by the Brazilian Institute of Geography and Statistics (IBGE) in 2017, the municipality of Mossoró is part of both the intermediate and immediate geographic regions of Mossoró. Prior to this, under the previous division into microregions and mesoregions, Mossoró was part of the Mossoró microregion, which was included in the Oeste Potiguar mesoregion. The municipality is located 281 kilometers from Natal, the state capital, 237 kilometers from Fortaleza, Ceará (the closest state capital), and 1,977 kilometers from Brasília, the federal capital. Covering an area of 2,099.36 km², (3.9753% of the state's surface), Mossoró is the largest municipality in Rio Grande do Norte by territorial extent. It borders the municipalities of Aracati (Ceará), Tibau, and Grossos to the north; Governador Dix-Sept Rosado and Upanema to the south; Areia Branca, Serra do Mel, and Assu to the east; and Baraúna to the west.

The terrain of the municipality, with predominant altitudes below 100 meters, comprises the Chapada do Apodi (encompassing areas intersected by the Apodi-Mossoró and Piranhas-Açu rivers with a slightly elevated tendency), the Sertaneja-São Francisco Depression (areas between the Chapada do Apodi and the Borborema Plateau), the sublittoral depression (transitional areas between coastal tablelands and the Borborema Plateau), and fluvial plains (located along riverbanks). The highest point in the municipality is Serra Mossoró, located 16 kilometers from the city, with a peak at an altitude of 268 meters.

The entire territory of the municipality lies within the Apodi/Mossoró River Hydrographic Basin. The main rivers flowing through the municipality are the Apodi/Mossoró and Carmo rivers. The main streams include Bonsucesso, Cabelo Negro, São Raimundo, and Pai Antônio. The largest reservoirs, with capacities equal to or greater than 100,000 cubic meters of water (m³), are the Açude Favela (500,000 m³), Lagoa de Paus Dam (264,000 m³), Baixo Dam (250,000 m³), Mossoró Dam, and Santana dos Pintos Dam (both with a capacity of 100,000 m³).

The biodiversity of Mossoró is evident in both its flora and fauna, with the latter being particularly notable due to the discovery of the species Hypsolebias bonita, an annual fish (killifish) locally known as the "cloud fish." This species was named in honor of Maria Bonita.

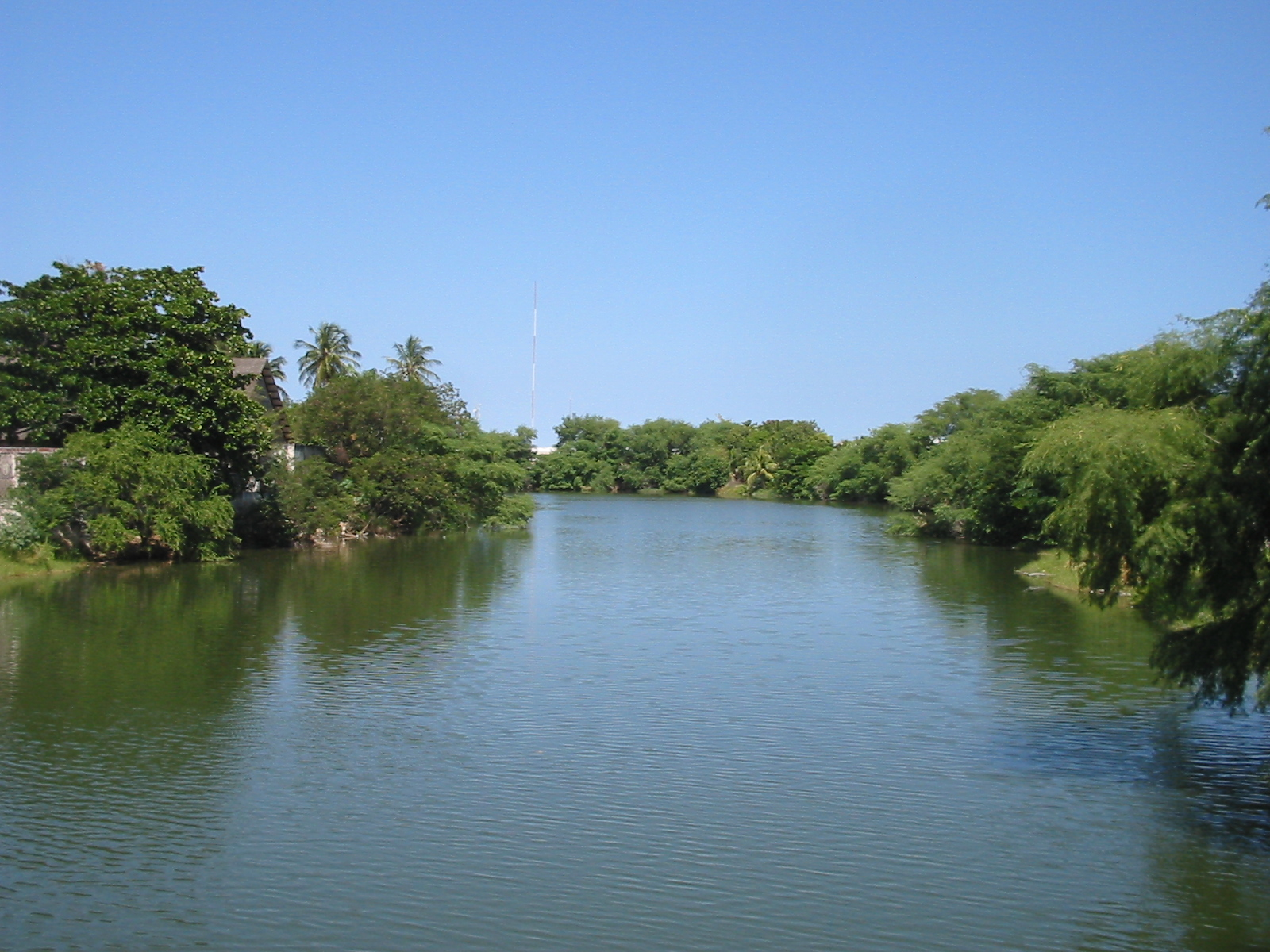
Mossoró River, with the vegetation of the hyperxerophilous caatinga along its banks.

The predominant soil types in the municipality are eutrophic Cambisol, which has high fertility, clay texture, and good to moderate drainage; rendzina, similar to Cambisol but with moderate to imperfect drainage; and Latosol, specifically the red-yellow eutrophic type, with medium to high fertility, medium texture, and good to excellent drainage. Other soil types include eutrophic equivalent red-yellow podzolic soils, solonchak, and Vertisol.

These soils are covered by hyperxerophilous caatinga, a vegetation type consisting of low-growing species adapted to drought, such as the faveleiro, black jurema, and mofumbo, as well as halophytic vegetation with species adapted to high salinity levels (including amaranth and pirrixiu), and carnaúba groves, where the carnaubeira and palm are predominant species. Part of Mossoró’s territory lies within the Furna Feia National Park, an environmental preservation area spanning 8,494 hectares (mostly in the municipality of Baraúna, with the remainder in Mossoró). The park was established by presidential decree on 5 June 2012, during World Environment Day celebrations, to preserve the local caatinga biome.

Mossoró, with its semi-arid climate classified as Bsh, is one of the hottest municipalities in Rio Grande do Norte. Temperatures can reach 38 °C on some occasions, with the apparent temperature occasionally exceeding 40 °C. Precipitation is concentrated in the first half of the year and occurs primarily as rain, with rare instances of hail. Rainfall may also be accompanied by lightning and thunderstorms, sometimes with significant intensity. During the afternoon, particularly in the dry season, relative humidity often drops below 30%, well below the 60% considered ideal by the World Health Organization (WHO). According to data from the National Institute of Meteorology (INMET), from 1970 to 2008, and the Rio Grande do Norte Agricultural Research Company (EMPARN), from March 2021 onward, the lowest temperature recorded in Mossoró was 16 °C on 7 June 1996, and the highest was 39.6 °C on 14 October 1979, both recorded by INMET. The highest single-day precipitation accumulation was 203.5 mm on 22 April 2013. The record for monthly precipitation belongs to April 1985, with 677.2 mm accumulated.

Climate data for Mossoró (1981–2010 normals, extremes 1969–present)
Month	Jan	Feb	Mar	Apr	May	Jun	Jul	Aug	Sep	Oct	Nov	Dec	Year
Record high °C (°F)	37.7 (99.9)	38.4 (101.1)	38.3 (100.9)	38.6 (101.5)	37.6 (99.7)	37.4 (99.3)	37.2 (99.0)	38.0 (100.4)	38.0 (100.4)	39.6 (103.3)	38.3 (100.9)	37.8 (100.0)	39.6 (103.3)
Mean daily maximum °C (°F)	34.1 (93.4)	33.9 (93.0)	33.1 (91.6)	32.6 (90.7)	32.6 (90.7)	32.5 (90.5)	33.1 (91.6)	34.3 (93.7)	35.0 (95.0)	35.1 (95.2)	34.9 (94.8)	34.8 (94.6)	33.8 (92.8)
Daily mean °C (°F)	28.5 (83.3)	28.2 (82.8)	27.6 (81.7)	27.4 (81.3)	27.2 (81.0)	26.9 (80.4)	27.0 (80.6)	27.7 (81.9)	28.3 (82.9)	28.7 (83.7)	28.7 (83.7)	29.0 (84.2)	27.9 (82.2)
Mean daily minimum °C (°F)	24.4 (75.9)	24.0 (75.2)	23.6 (74.5)	23.5 (74.3)	23.1 (73.6)	22.0 (71.6)	21.6 (70.9)	21.7 (71.1)	22.6 (72.7)	23.5 (74.3)	23.7 (74.7)	24.2 (75.6)	23.2 (73.8)
Record low °C (°F)	17.1 (62.8)	17.7 (63.9)	18.5 (65.3)	16.2 (61.2)	18.0 (64.4)	16.0 (60.8)	16.9 (62.4)	16.5 (61.7)	17.1 (62.8)	16.1 (61.0)	16.7 (62.1)	17.9 (64.2)	16.0 (60.8)
Average precipitation mm (inches)	55.6 (2.19)	95.8 (3.77)	161.9 (6.37)	162.1 (6.38)	101.4 (3.99)	45.2 (1.78)	24.9 (0.98)	8.4 (0.33)	2.3 (0.09)	2.1 (0.08)	5.5 (0.22)	17.0 (0.67)	682.2 (26.86)
Average relative humidity (%)	71.5	72.7	78.6	81.4	77.3	72.9	66.7	61.7	60.1	61.7	64.5	65.1	69.5
Mean monthly sunshine hours	233.9	204.5	215.4	205.5	227.1	215.9	242.1	276.3	289.5	305.6	293.8	274.6	2,983.9
Source 1: INMET temperature records: 01/01/1970 to 02/10/2008)
Source 2: EMPARN (precipitation averages: 1916–2013; temperature records: 17/03/2021–present)

== Demography ==
Historical population
Year	Pop.	±%
1872	8,000	—
1900	12,602	+57.5%
1920	20,300	+61.1%
1940	31,515	+55.2%
1950	40,681	+29.1%
1960	41,476	+2.0%
1970	97,245	+134.5%
1980	145,981	+50.1%
1991	192,267	+31.7%
2000	213,841	+11.2%
2010	259,815	+21.5%
2022	264,577	+1.8%
Source: IBGE

With 264,577 inhabitants according to the latest demographic census, Mossoró is the second most populous municipality in the state of Rio Grande do Norte, with a population density of 126.03 inhabitants per km². According to the same census, 52.18% of the population were women and 47.82% were men, resulting in a sex ratio of 91.63. Regarding color or race, 58.39% of inhabitants identified as mixed race, 25.5% as white, 14.63% as black, 1.25% as indigenous, and only 0.23% as Asian. Between the 2010 and 2022 censuses, Mossoró’s population grew at a geometric rate of 0.15% per year.

=== Socioeconomic Indicators ===
The Human Development Index (HDI) of the municipality is considered high by the United Nations Development Programme (UNDP). According to data from the 2010 report, released in 2013, its value was 0.720, making it the third highest in Rio Grande do Norte, behind only Parnamirim (1st) and Natal (2nd), and the 1,301st in Brazil. When considering specific components, the longevity index is 0.811, the income index is 0.694, and the education index is 0.663.

From 2000 to 2010, the Gini index decreased from 0.57 to 0.52, and the proportion of people with a per capita household income of up to R$140 dropped by 60.6%, from 35.4% to 14%. In 2010, 86.05% of Mossoró’s population lived above the poverty line, 9.09% were between the poverty and indigence lines, and 4.86% were below the indigence line. In the same year, the Gini index was 0.52, and the share of the richest 20% of the population in the municipality’s total income was 57.6%, nearly fifteen times higher than that of the poorest 20%, which was 3.85%.

=== Religion ===
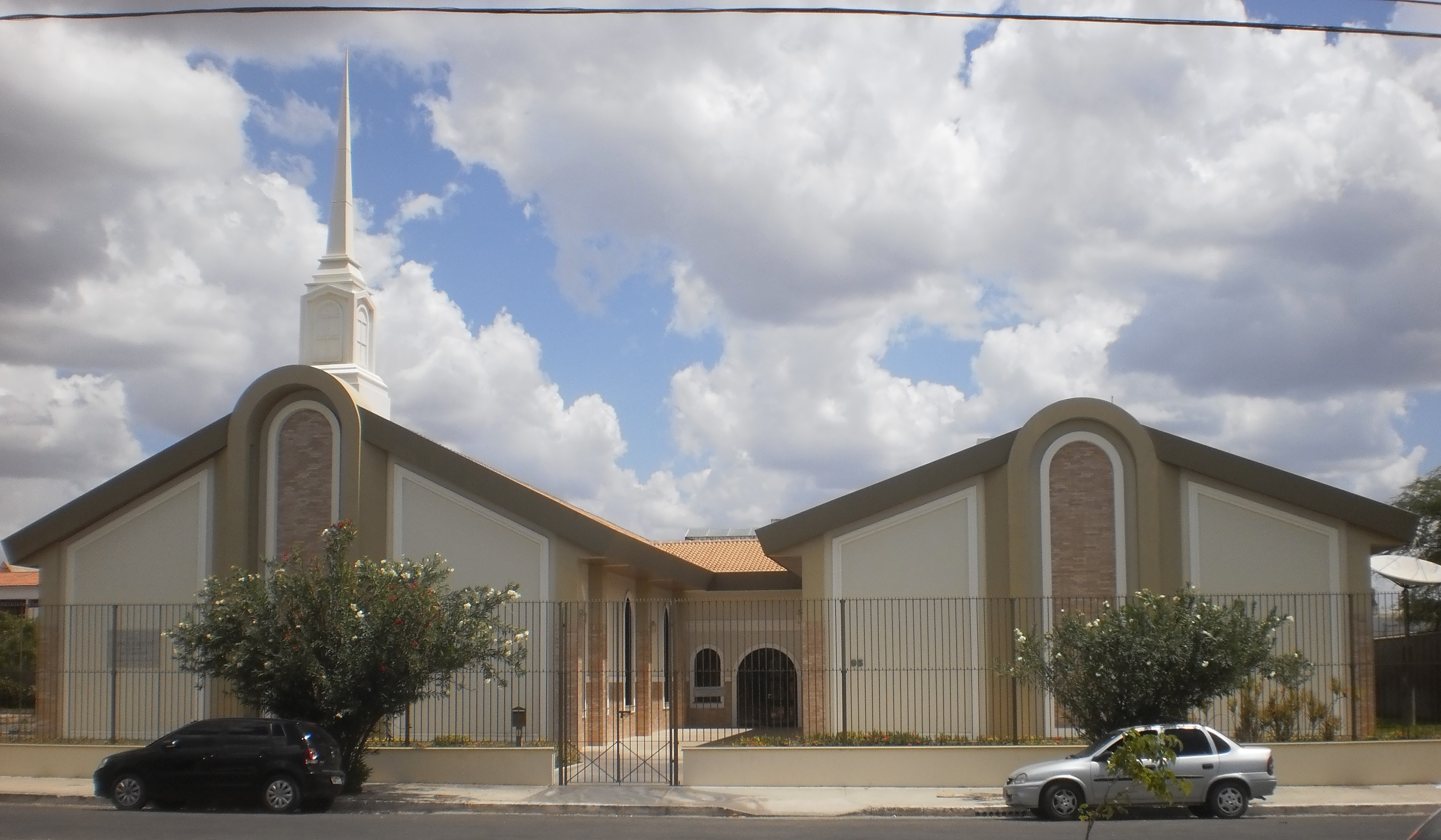
Chapel of the Church of Jesus Christ of Latter-day Saints in Mossoró

In the 2010 census, the most recent with published data on religion, Roman Catholicism was the predominant religion in Mossoró, with 70.69% of residents identifying as Catholic. This was followed by Evangelicals (18.46%), Spiritists (0.62%), Jehovah's Witnesses (0.47%), and Latter-day Saints (0.24%); other denominations accounted for 0.92%. Additionally, 8.6% of the population had no religion, including atheists (0.19%) and agnostics (0.02%); 0.12% had no specific religion or multiple affiliations, and 0.02% did not know.

Within the Catholic Church, Mossoró is the seat of the Diocese of Santa Luzia, a suffragan of the Archdiocese of Natal, canonically erected by Pope Pius XI on 28 July 1934 and formally established on 18 November of the same year. The diocese covers an area of 18,847 km² and has as its episcopal see the Santa Luzia Cathedral, constructed in the 18th century between 1772 and 1773, rebuilt in the 19th century, inaugurated in 1830, and elevated to parish church status in 1842. It became the diocesan cathedral in 1934 upon the creation of the diocese.

Mossoró is also home to a variety of Protestant or Reformed denominations, with the five largest being: Assemblies of God (7.82% of residents), Baptist Church (1.97%), Universal Church of the Kingdom of God (0.67%), Seventh-day Adventist Church (0.57%), and Presbyterian Church of Brazil (0.39%). Other Protestant denominations account for 0.61%.

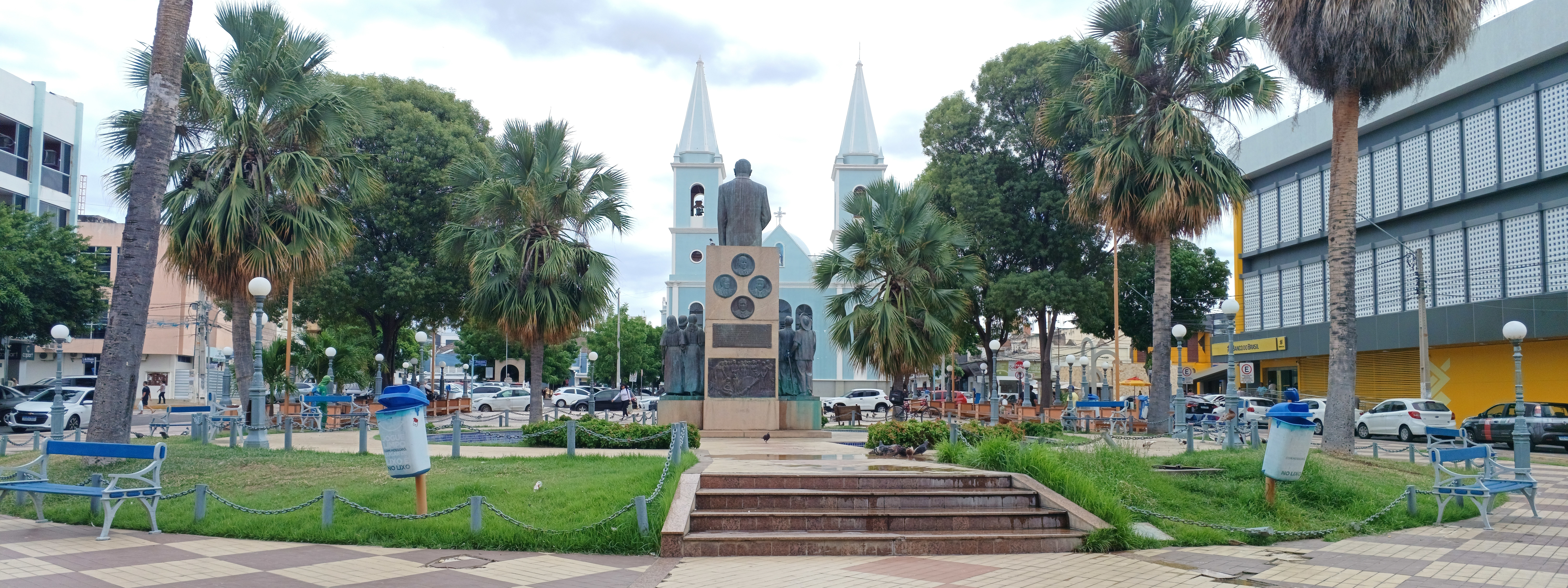
Vigário Antônio Joaquim Square in downtown Mossoró, with the Santa Luzia Cathedral, the episcopal see of the Diocese of Mossoró, in the background.

== Politics ==
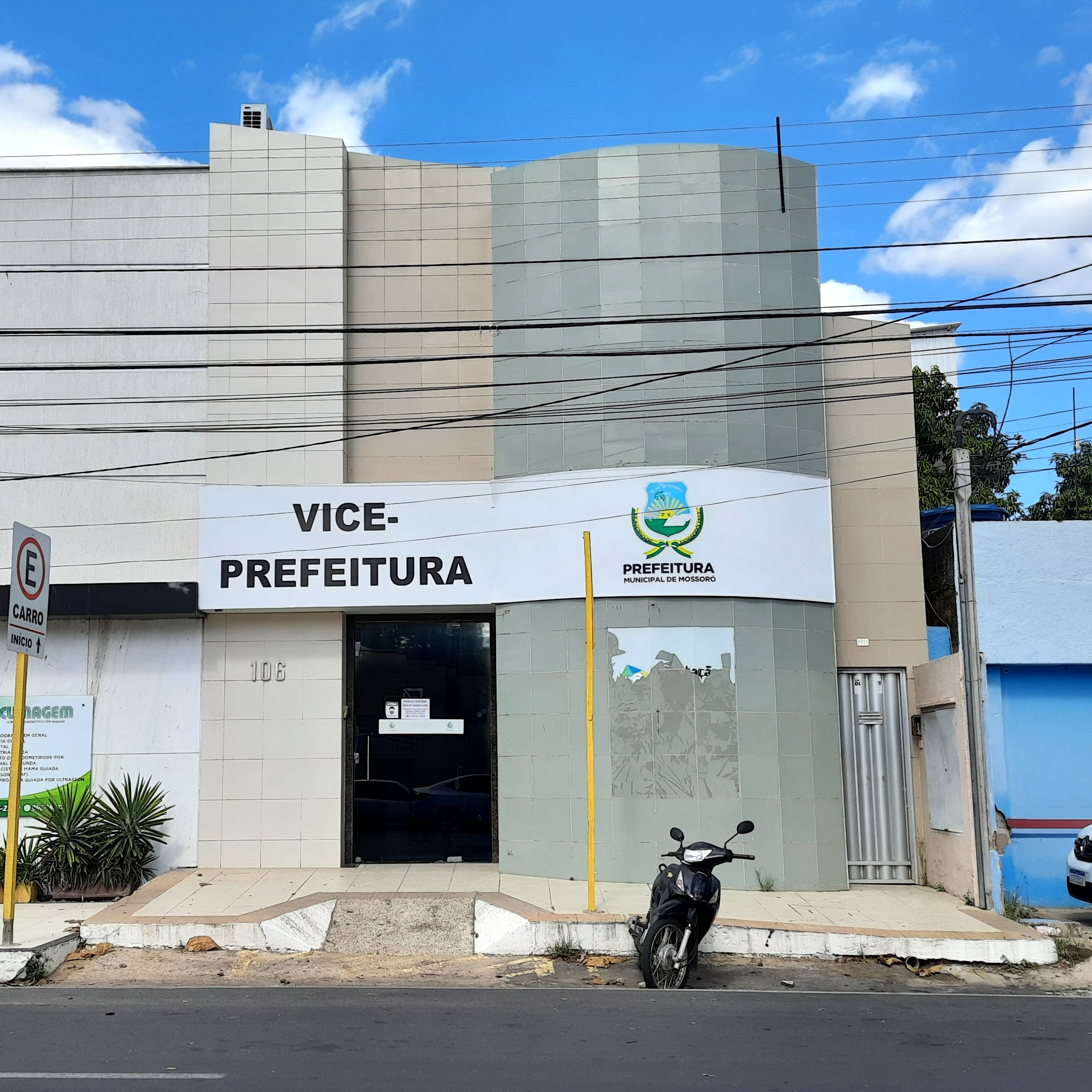
Headquarters of the Vice-Mayor's Office in Mossoró

Municipal administration in Mossoró is conducted through the executive and legislative branches. The executive branch is led by the mayor, supported by a cabinet of secretaries. The first constitutional mayor of Mossoró was Father Antônio Freire de Carvalho, who served in 1853. The current mayor is Allyson Leandro Bezerra Silva of the Solidarity (SD) party. Bezerra, who served as a state deputy from 2019 to 2020, was elected mayor in 2020 with 47.52% of the valid votes and was sworn in on 1 January 2021. The deputy mayor is João Fernandes de Melo Neto of the Social Democratic Party (PSD). The legislative branch is represented by the Municipal Chamber, located at the Rodolfo Fernandes Palace, which comprises 23 councilors. The chamber is responsible for drafting and voting on fundamental laws for the administration and the executive, particularly the municipal budget (known as the Budget Guidelines Law).

In addition to the legislative process and the work of the secretariats, several municipal councils are active, including those focused on Anti-Drug Policies, Social Assistance, Guardianship, Culture, Environmental Protection, Sustainable Economic Development, Women's Rights, Education, FUMAC, FUNDEF, Health, Community Work, and Tourism. The municipality is governed by its organic law, enacted on 3 April 1990. Mossoró also hosts a third-grade state judiciary court at the Dr. Silveira Martins Forum, with the municipality of Serra do Mel as its term. According to the Superior Electoral Court (TSE), as of December 2020, Mossoró had 175,169 registered voters (7.181% of Rio Grande do Norte's electorate), distributed across two electoral zones (33rd and 34th).

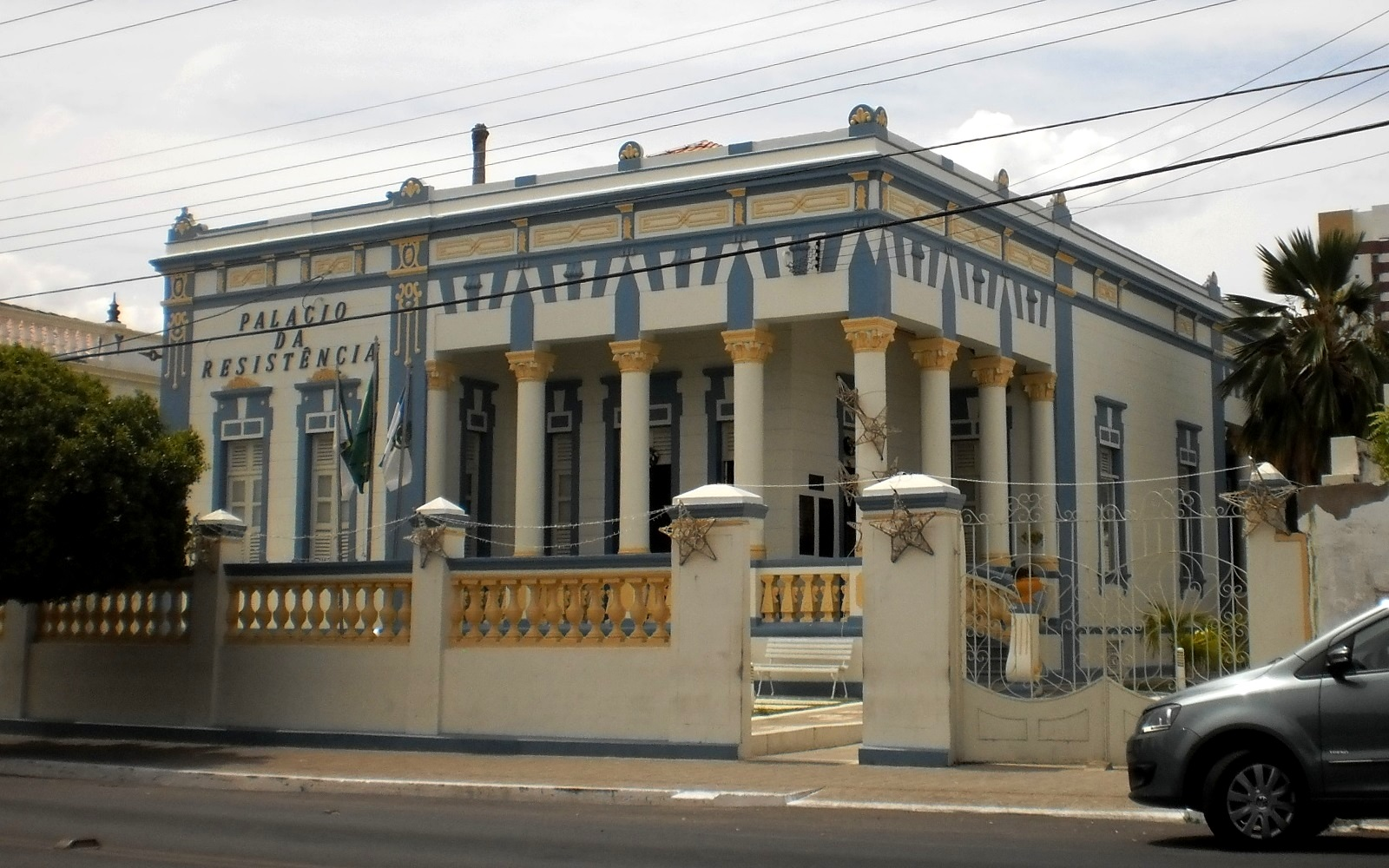
Palácio da Resistência (City Hall), headquarters of the municipal executive branch

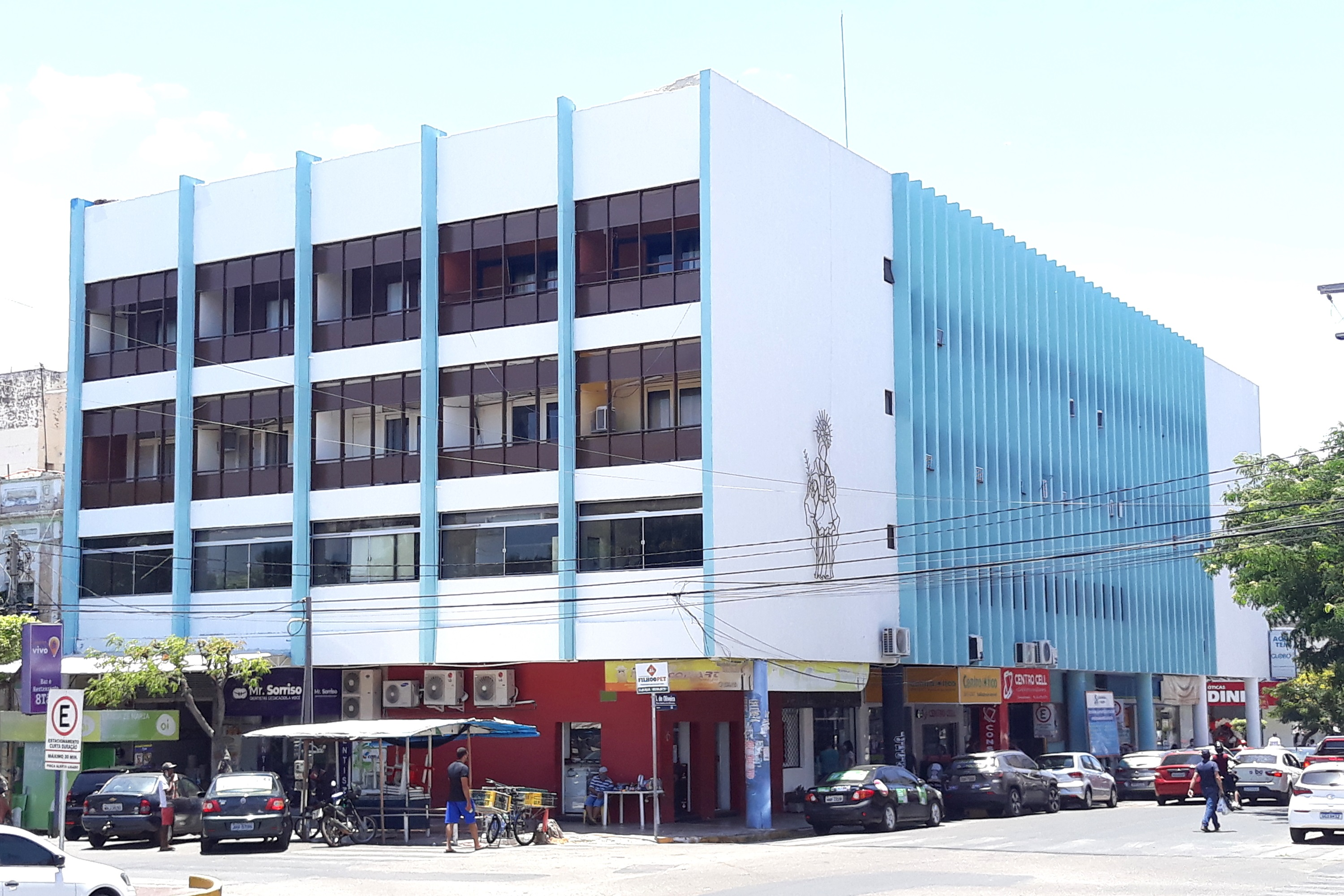
Rodolfo Fernandes Palace (Municipal Chamber), headquarters of the legislative branch

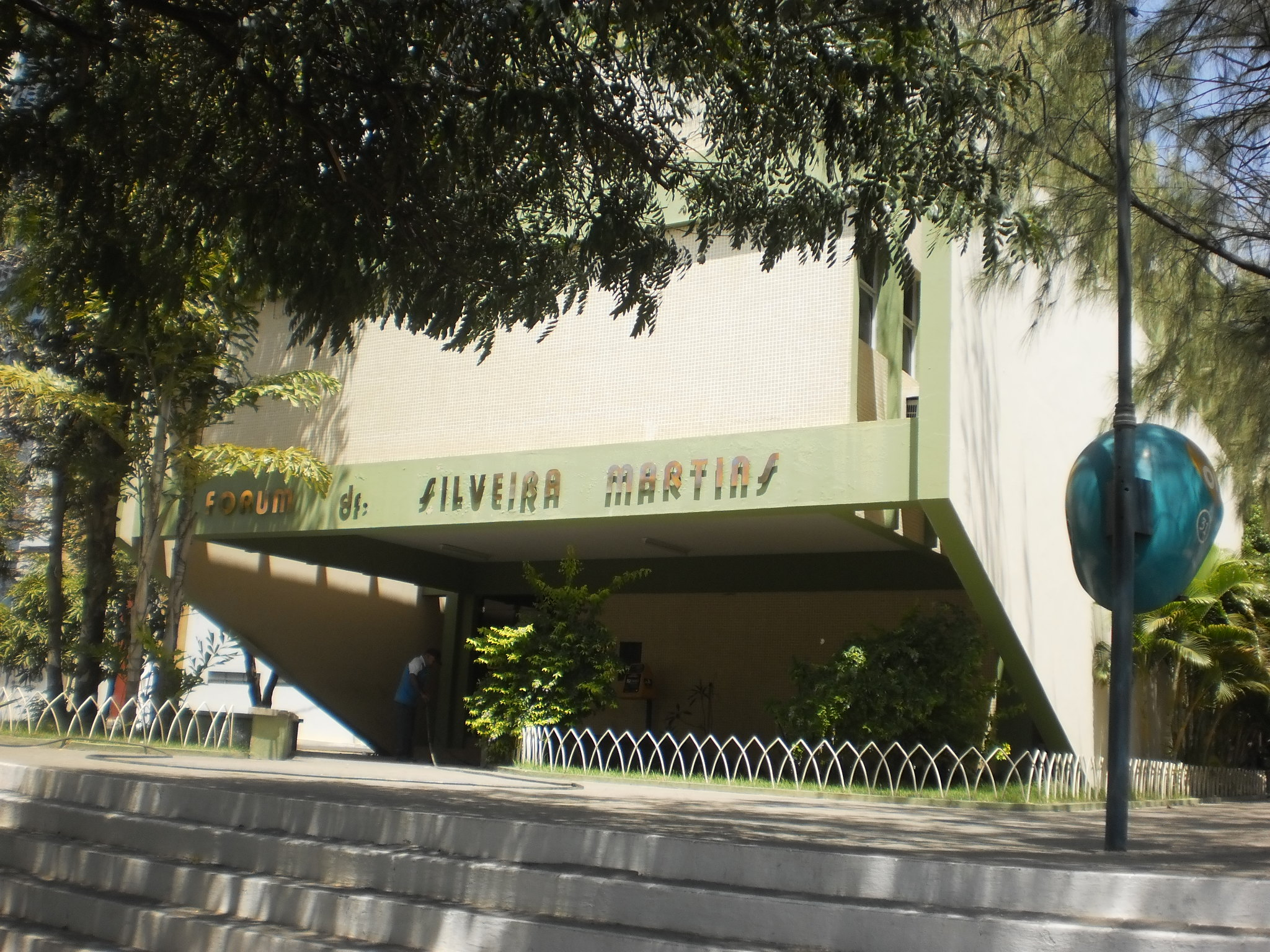
Dr. Silveira Martins Forum, headquarters of the Mossoró state judiciary court

== Economy ==
The gross domestic product (GDP) of Mossoró is the second largest in Rio Grande do Norte and the largest in the state's western region. According to 2013 data from the Brazilian Institute of Geography and Statistics (IBGE), the municipality's GDP was R$6,538,346,000, with R$2,648,585,000 from the service sector, R$1,988,062,000 from industry, R$1,028,608,000 from municipal administration (excluding tax revenue), R$731,678,000 from taxes, and R$141,413,000 from agriculture. The per capita GDP was R$23,325.08.

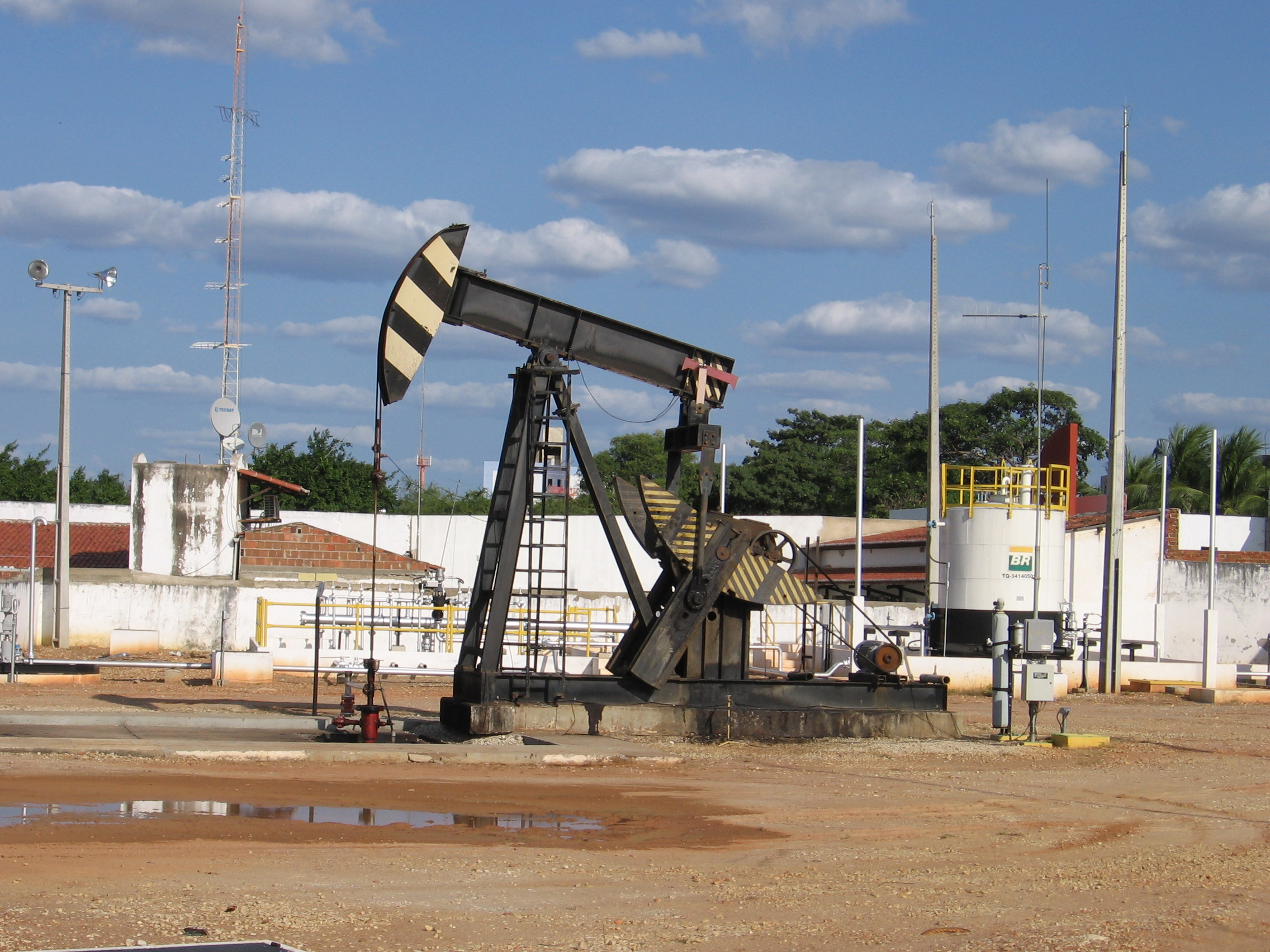
Oil extraction in the territory of Mossoró. The municipality is the largest onshore oil producer in Brazil.

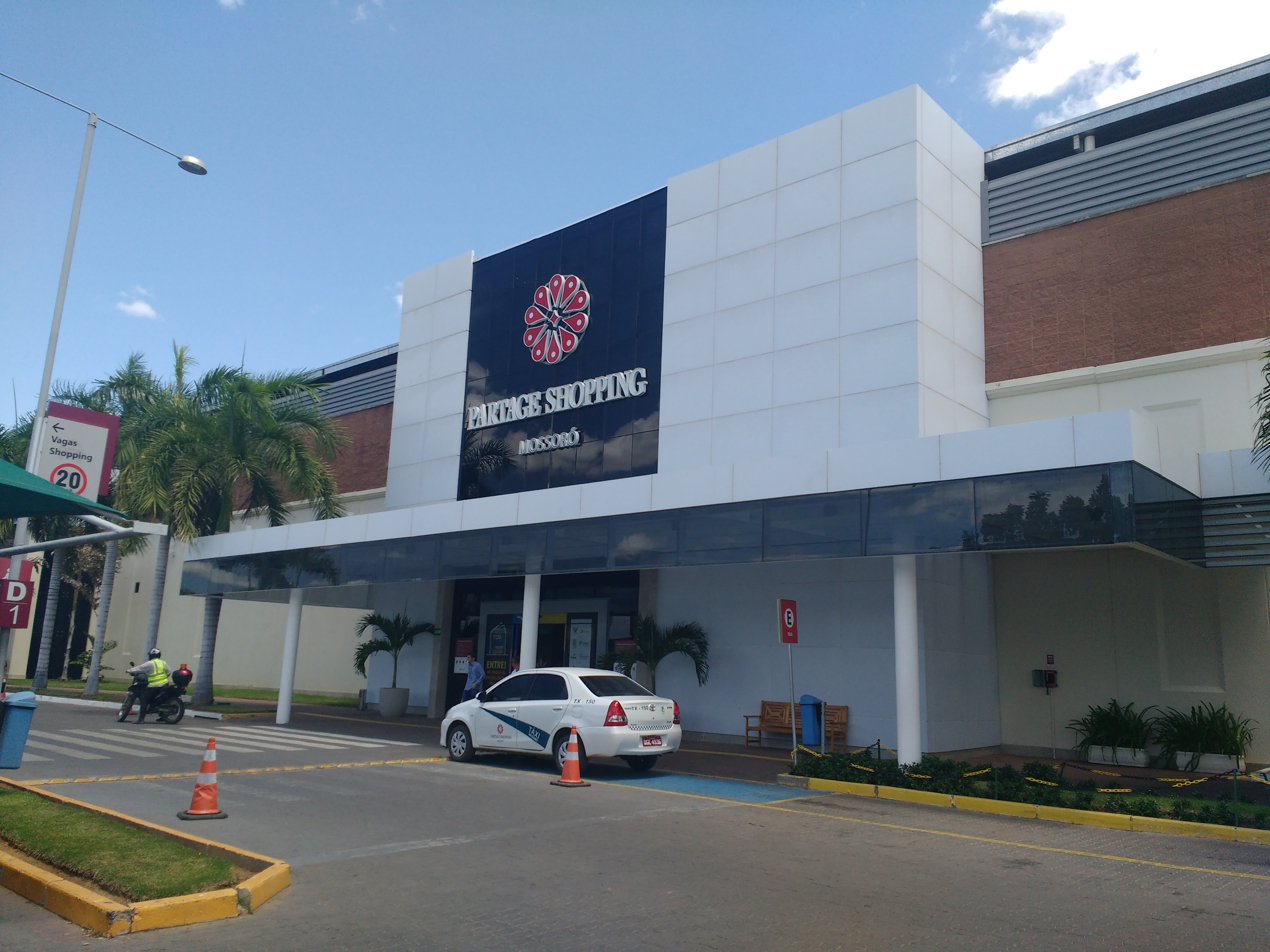
Partage Shopping Mossoró, formerly Mossoró West Shopping, one of the main shopping malls in Rio Grande do Norte

In 2010, among the municipal population aged 18 or older, 64.1% were economically active and employed, 25.8% were economically inactive, and 10.1% were economically active but unemployed. In the same year, among the employed economically active population in this age group, 43.71% worked in the service sector, 19.72% in commerce, 9.78% in construction, 8.52% in manufacturing industries, 5.67% in agriculture, 4.5% in extractive industries, and only 0.76% in public utilities. According to the 2014 Business Registry Statistics, Mossoró had 5,891 local units (businesses), of which 5,577 were active.

In the primary sector, irrigated horticulture stands out. Mossoró, together with the neighboring municipalities of Assu and Baraúna, forms the Mossoró/Baraúna/Assu Hub, the largest melon producer in Brazil, followed by the Médio Jaguaribe region in the neighboring state of Ceará. In 2007, the hub produced approximately 254,000 tons of melons, with 204,000 tons exported to international markets. Since 1990, the region centered around Mossoró has been recognized by the Ministry of Agriculture as a "Fruit Fly" or "Anastrepha Grandis pest-free area," facilitating the entry of Mossoró's products into consumer markets such as the United States, Japan, and the European Union.

According to IBGE data from 2015, the municipality produced, in temporary crops, 187,600 tons of melon, 56,000 tons of watermelon, 264 tons of maize, 240 tons of cassava, 190 tons of beans, 1,170 tons of onions, and 19 tons of sorghum. In permanent crops, production included 54,000 coconuts, 3,900 tons of papaya, 1,100 tons of bananas, 1,000 tons of mangoes, 829 tons of cashew nuts, 54 tons of oranges, and 38 tons of passion fruit. In livestock, the municipality had a herd of 846,621 poultry, 35,912 sheep, 28,100 quail, 24,108 goats, 19,102 cattle, 18,900 pigs, and 3,812 horses, while also producing 23,800 dozen eggs, 7,750,000 liters of milk, 6,800,000 dozen quail eggs, and 5,680 kilograms of honey.

In industry, Mossoró is the largest national producer of both salt and onshore oil, with a daily production of 47,000 barrels and over 3,500 wells. The production of cement and ceramics is also significant, with several branches of large companies operating in the area. Mossoró is one of the main industrial hubs in Rio Grande do Norte, alongside Natal, hosting a significant concentration of textile, clothing, and tourism-related industries. In recent years, construction has also gained prominence in Mossoró's economy.

Mossoró's commerce is among the most dynamic in Rio Grande do Norte. The city features several shopping centers, including Partage Shopping Mossoró, formerly Mossoró West Shopping, the first shopping mall in the municipality, inaugurated in 2007 and the largest shopping center in the western region of Rio Grande do Norte. It has been managed since 2011 by the São Paulo-based Partage group. Other shopping centers include Atacadão, Maxxi Atacado, and Big Hiper Bompreço. Additionally, there are micro and small businesses, as well as the Public Market of Mossoró, the city's oldest commercial center, built in the 19th century around 1875, completed two years later, and rebuilt three decades later. Located in the city center, it remains one of the most frequented commercial spaces in Mossoró.

== Infrastructure ==
The water supply in Mossoró is managed by the Rio Grande do Norte Water and Sewage Company (CAERN). The electricity supply is provided by the Rio Grande do Norte Energy Company (COSERN), part of the Neoenergia Group, which serves all 167 municipalities in Rio Grande do Norte. The nominal voltage of the network is 220 volts. In 2010, 95.15% of households had piped water, 99.54% had electricity, and 92.98% had waste collection. Waste is disposed of in a sanitary landfill in the rural area, operational since 2008.

The area code (DDD) for Mossoró is 084, and the Postal Code (CEP) ranges from 59600-000 to 59649-999. In 2010, according to IBGE, 68.43% of households had only mobile phones, 20.37% had both mobile and landline phones, 1.59% had only landlines, and 9.57% had no phones. The city is also home to InterTV Costa Branca, a TV Globo affiliate, inaugurated in March 2015. Among the circulating newspapers, O Mossoroense stands out as one of the oldest in Latin America, founded on 17 October 1872 and available only online since 2016.

=== Healthcare ===
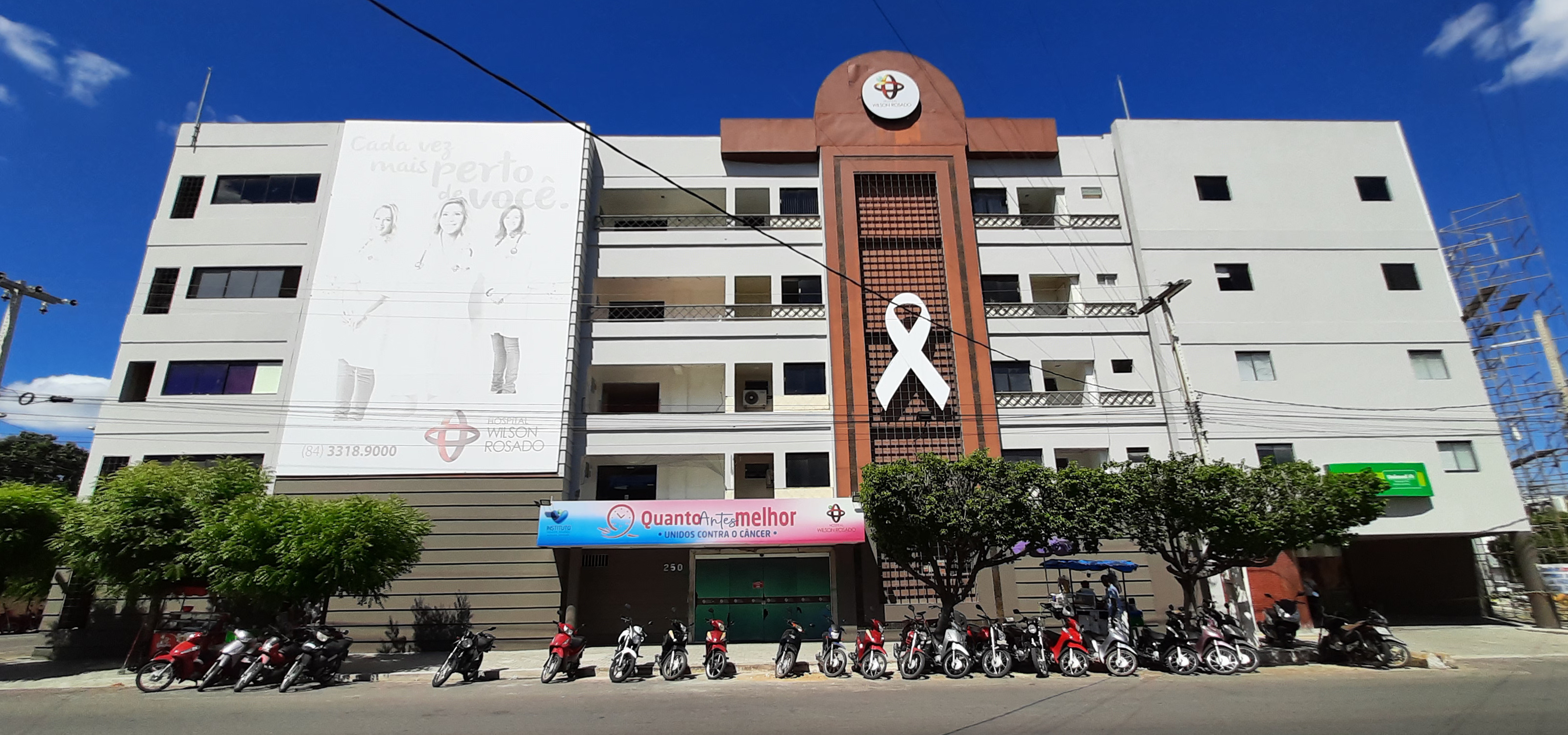
Wilson Rosado Hospital

In 2009, Mossoró had 115 health facilities, 68 private and 47 public (43 state-run and four municipal), including hospitals, emergency departments, health centers, and dentistry services, with a total of 664 inpatient beds. In April 2010, the municipality's professional healthcare workforce consisted of 977 physicians, 338 nursing assistants, 209 nurses, 196 dentists, 146 nursing technicians, 101 social workers, 95 pharmacists, 48 physiotherapists, 30 psychologists, 27 nutritionists, and 22 speech therapists, totaling 2,189 professionals.

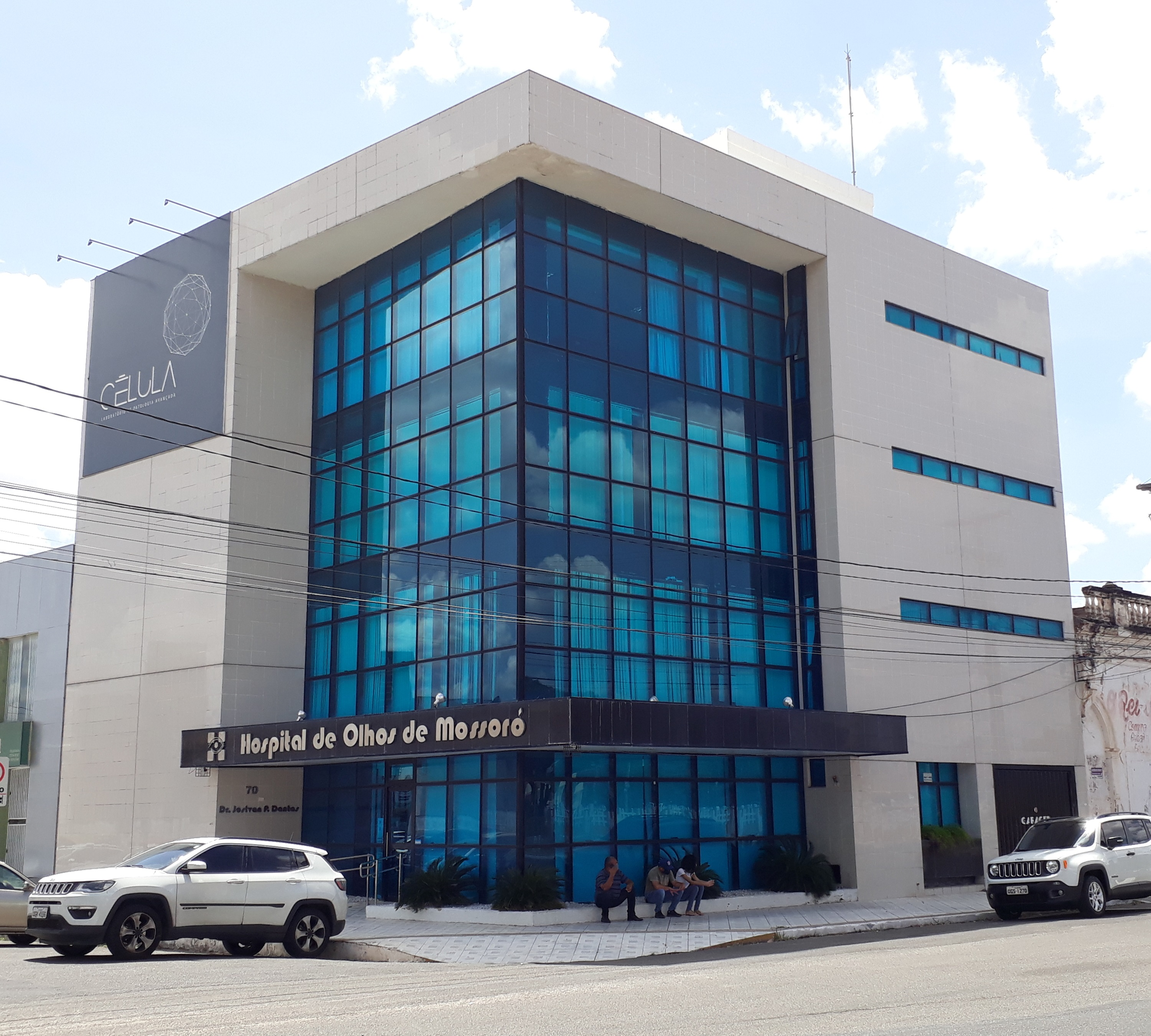
Eye Hospital of Mossoró

In the same year, the life expectancy at birth was 73.64 years, the infant mortality rate was 17.9 per 1,000 births, and the fertility rate was 2.0 children per woman. According to data from the Ministry of Health, between 1990 and 2013, 536 cases of AIDS were recorded in Mossoró, and from 2001 to 2011, 5,471 cases of dengue, 283 cases of leishmaniasis, and two cases of malaria were reported. In 2014, 94.7% of children under one year of age had up-to-date vaccination records, and among children under two years weighed by the Family Health Program (PSF), 0.7% were malnourished.

Mossoró hosts the II Regional Public Health Unit of Rio Grande do Norte (II URSAP). The Dr. Tarcísio Maia Regional Hospital, inaugurated on 10 May 1986, is the largest and main hospital in the municipality, serving as a reference for the western Rio Grande do Norte region and offering services in various specialties. The Rafael Fernandes Hospital is also notable. Other hospitals in Mossoró include Almeida Castro (maternity hospital), LMECC, Ophthalmology, Eye Hospital, Kidney Hospital, São Camilo de Léllis, Military Police Hospital, São Luiz Ltda, Unimed, and Wilson Rosado. Until 2016, there was also the Maria Correia Women's Hospital, which was closed by the state government.

=== Education ===
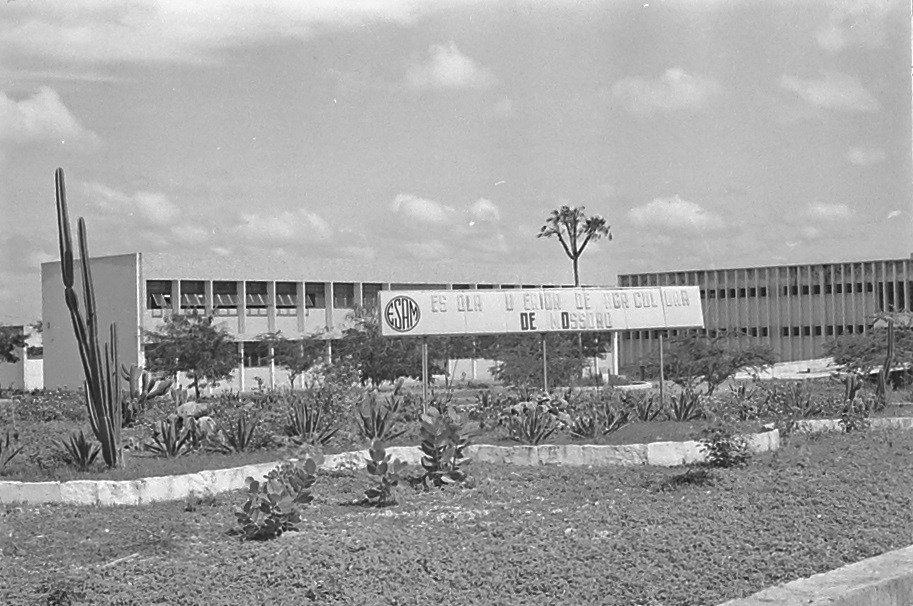
Superior School of Agriculture of Mossoró (ESAM) in 1974, transformed into the Federal Rural University of the Semi-arid Region (UFERSA) in 2005

The education component of the Human Development Index (HDI) in Mossoró reached 0.663 in 2010, while the literacy rate for the population aged ten and older, as reported by the 2010 census, was 87% (85.1% for men and 88.9% for women). The completion rates for primary education (ages 15 to 17) and secondary education (ages 18 to 24) were 84.7% and 47.5%, respectively, with a literacy rate of 96.7% for the population aged 15 to 24.

Basic Education Development Index of Mossoró
Year	Early Years	Final Years
2005	3.2	2.9
2007	3.0	3.0
2009	4.1	2.8
2011	4.5	3.3
2013	4.8	3.7
2015	5.2	3.7

In 2010, Mossoró had an expected number of years of schooling of 9.97 years, surpassing the state average of 9.54 years. The percentage of children aged five to six in school was 96.6%, and those aged 11 to 13 attending primary education was 87.18%. Among youths, 57.96% of those aged 15 to 17 had completed primary education, and 45.68% of those aged 18 to 20 had completed secondary education. Among the population aged 25 or older, 51.55% had completed primary education, 37.84% had completed secondary education, 17.33% were illiterate, and 9.89% had completed higher education.

In 2015, the lag in primary education (students older than the recommended age) was 11.4% for early years and 30.6% for final years, with a lag of 35.5% in secondary education. In the same year, the municipality had a network of 164 primary schools (with 1,832 teachers), 123 preschools (385 teachers), and 37 secondary schools (594 teachers).

In higher education, Mossoró is home to the headquarters of the State University of Rio Grande do Norte (UERN) and the Federal Rural University of the Semi-arid Region (UFERSA), the latter established in 2005 from the transformation of the Superior School of Agriculture of Mossoró (ESAM), founded by municipal decree in 1967. Other higher education institutions in the municipality include the Federal Institute of Rio Grande do Norte (IFRN); Catholic University of Rio Grande do Norte; Nova Esperança University of Nursing and Medicine (FACENE); Pitágoras University; Maurício de Nassau University Center (UNINASSAU); Leonardo da Vinci University Center (UNIASSELVI); Vale do Jaguaribe University (FVJ); Regional University of Bahia (UNIRB); and Potiguar University (UNP).

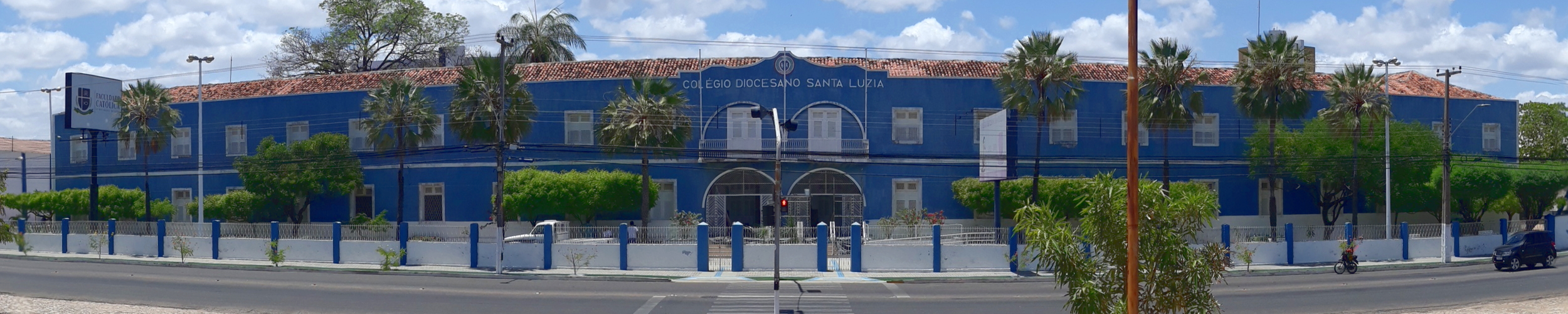
Santa Luzia Diocesan School, founded on 2 March 1901

=== Crime and public safety ===
According to the 2014 Violence Map, based on 2012 data from the Sangari Institute, among municipalities with over 20,000 inhabitants, Mossoró's homicide rate was 60.0 per 100,000 inhabitants, ranking fifth in the state and 162nd nationally. The suicide rate that year was 9.4 per 100,000 inhabitants, ranking eighth in the state and 289th nationally. The rate of deaths from traffic accidents was 43.5 per 100,000 inhabitants, ranking first in the state and 203rd nationally.

More recent data from the Rio Grande do Norte Secretariat of Public Security and Social Defense (SESED/RN) indicate that 2016 was the most violent year in Mossoró's history, with 217 homicides, with the Santo Antônio neighborhood being the most violent in the city. According to the 2016 Violence Atlas by the Institute of Applied Economic Research (IPEA), Mossoró had a homicide rate of 71.5 per 100,000 inhabitants, making it the ninth most violent municipality in Brazil and the second in the state, after Macaíba in the Natal Metropolitan Region.

To address these crime rates, the 2nd and 12th military police battalions of Rio Grande do Norte, based in Mossoró, work alongside public authorities to implement public safety measures. The city is home to a federal penitentiary, inaugurated in 2009, and has a municipal guard, established by Complementary Law 37 on 14 December 2009, to contribute to public safety.

=== Transportation ===
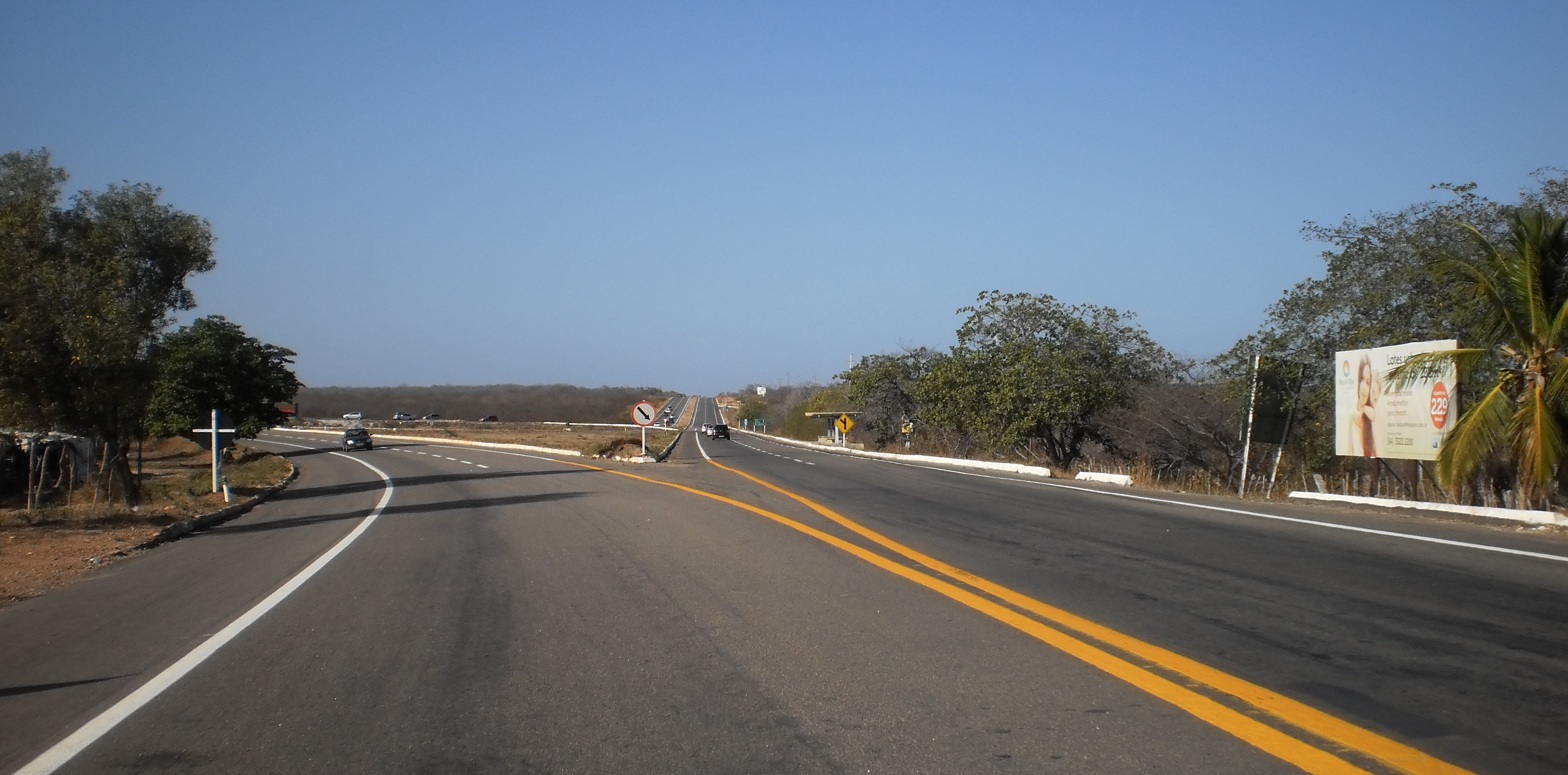
Intersection of BR-304 (curve) with RN-013 (in the background), connecting Mossoró to Natal/Fortaleza and Tibau, respectively

In 2018, the municipal vehicle fleet totaled 162,639 vehicles, including 59,267 cars, 51,782 motorcycles, 16,810 mopeds, 10,661 pickup trucks, 9,160 light trucks, 4,196 trucks, 3,075 utility vehicles, 2,549 SUVs, 1,883 utility vehicles, 1,543 semi-trailers, 907 tractor-trailers, 387 buses, 293 minibuses, 96 tricycles, 20 tractors, three sidecars, one platform chassis, and ten in other categories. Since 2009, Mossoró's traffic has been municipalized and is managed by the Municipal Secretariat of Public Safety, Civil Defense, Urban Mobility, and Traffic.

The municipality is crossed by the following federal highways: BR-405, starting in Mossoró and extending through the western Rio Grande do Norte region to Marizópolis, in the Paraíba backlands; BR-304, connecting Natal and Fortaleza; and BR-110, starting in Areia Branca, passing through the municipal seat, and extending to Catu, in Bahia. State highways crossing Mossoró include RN-013, recently expanded, linking Mossoró to Tibau; RN-015, connecting Mossoró to Baraúna; and RN-117, connecting Mossoró to various municipalities in the western Rio Grande do Norte region.

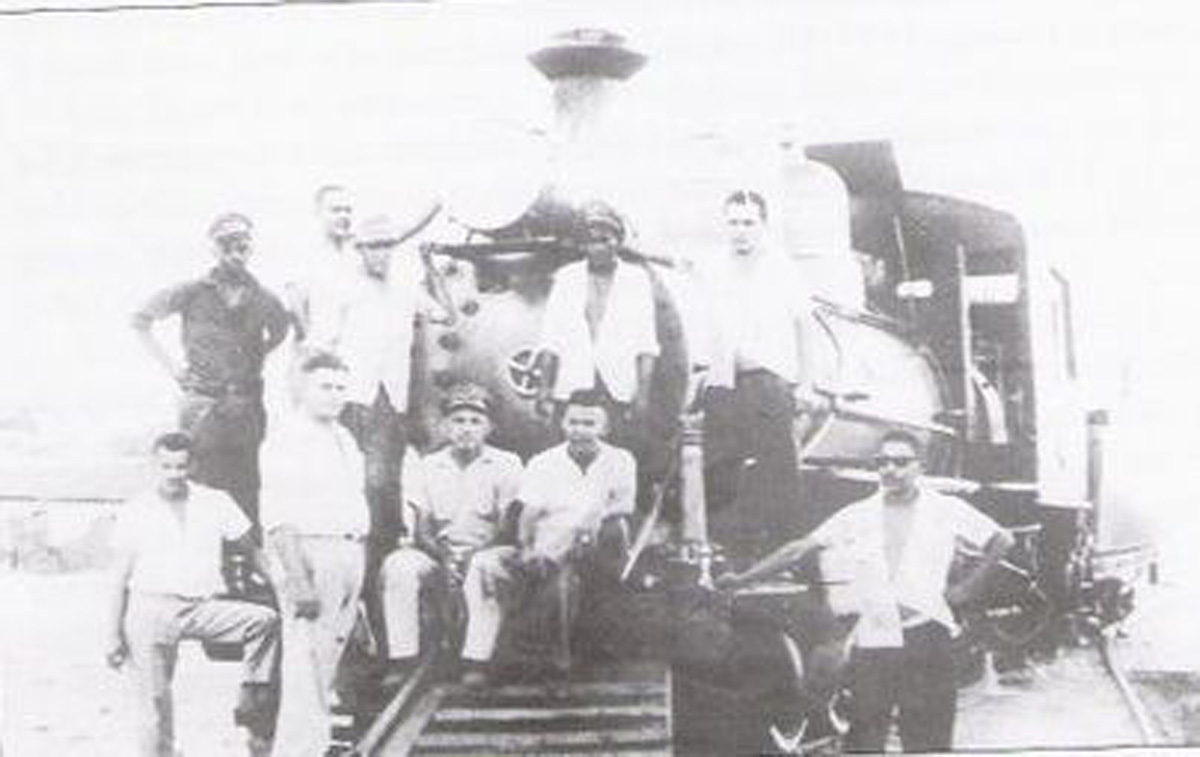
First locomotive of the Mossoró-Porto Franco Railway, in 1915

In air transport, Mossoró is served by the Dix-Sept Rosado Airport, located in the Aeroporto neighborhood and managed by the Department of Highways of Rio Grande do Norte (DER-RN). Another form of urban transportation is the bicycle, although there are few kilometers of bike lanes. Projects are underway to build more bike lanes and dedicated bicycle parking to improve urban mobility.

Mossoró was once crossed by the Mossoró-Sousa Railway, designed in the 19th century and inaugurated on 15 March 1915, initially connecting the municipality to Porto Franco (now Areia Branca). Over time, the railway expanded, reaching Sousa in the Paraíba backlands by 1950. Since the 1970s, the railway has been deactivated, though passenger trains continued operating on the Mossoró branch until 1991. Today, parts of the tracks no longer exist, and the old railway station has been transformed into the current Elizeu Ventania Arts Station.

== Culture ==
Despite being a cultural hub, Mossoró has yet to establish a defined historic center. The NGO Salv'Art - Institute of Service and Support for Art, Culture, Citizenship, and Environment - has been seeking support from public authorities to designate the former Redenção Square, now Dorian Jorge Freire Square, as the historic center, as it retains much of the city's original architecture intact.

Municipal holidays include 30 September, commemorating the abolition of slavery in the municipality, and 13 December, the feast day of the patron saint Saint Lucy. The day Mossoró was elevated to city status, 9 November, is considered an optional holiday.

=== Cultural spaces and tourist attractions ===
Mossoró features several cultural spaces, including museums and theaters. The city has two theaters, the oldest being the Lauro Monte Filho Theater, located in the city center with a capacity of 483 people. The theater operates in the same building that once housed the Cine Cid cinema, inaugurated on 22 July 1964. It later served as a temple for the Universal Church of the Kingdom of God and was converted into a theater in 1999 after being purchased by the state government. It was closed in 2008 due to structural issues and reopened in 2018.

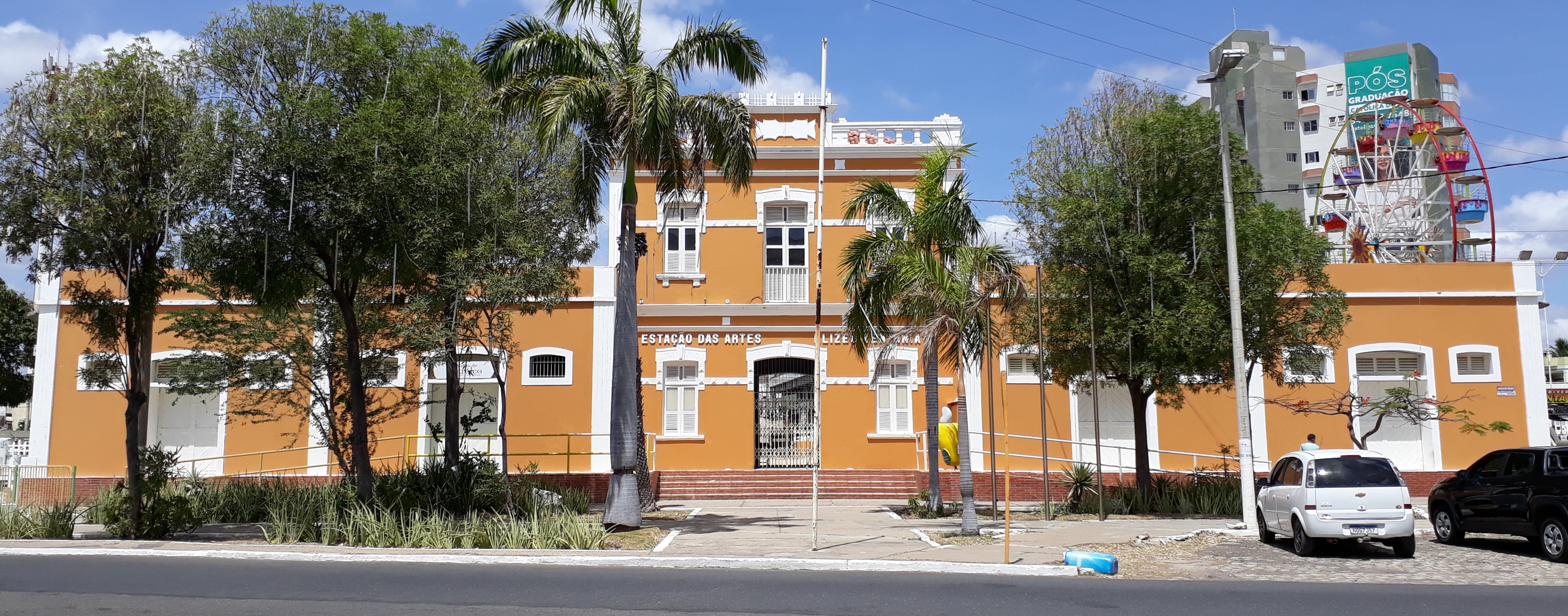
Elizeu Ventania Arts Station, formerly the railway station, now home to the Petroleum Museum and host of Mossoró's main cultural events

The Dix-Huit Rosado Municipal Theater, the city's main theater, was inaugurated in 2003, built by the municipality in partnership with Petrobras, with a capacity of 740 seats. It hosts various cultural performances, including folk dances, theatrical plays, assemblies, and other events. Among the museums, the Mossoró Resistance Memorial features exhibitions highlighting the cangaço and the city's resistance to Lampião's gang during its 1927 invasion.

The Elizeu Ventania Arts Station, formerly the railway station, houses the Petroleum Museum, which displays a diverse collection of materials on the history of petroleum in Mossoró and Rio Grande do Norte. The Journalist Lauro Escóssia Municipal Museum, once a public jail, was established in 1948 and is now a key part of the city's cultural center, showcasing exhibitions on Mossoró's history and historical documents. The Vingt-Un Rosado Paleontology Museum houses fossil specimens from the former ESAM (Superior School of Agriculture of Mossoró), now UFERSA.

As the main city of the Costa Branca Hub, Mossoró is one of the top tourist destinations in Rio Grande do Norte. Notable tourist attractions include the São Vicente Chapel, the Santa Luzia Cathedral, the São Sebastião Cemetery, the Public Market, the Goat Market, as well as the museums, the Dix-Huit Rosado Theater, and the Arts Station.

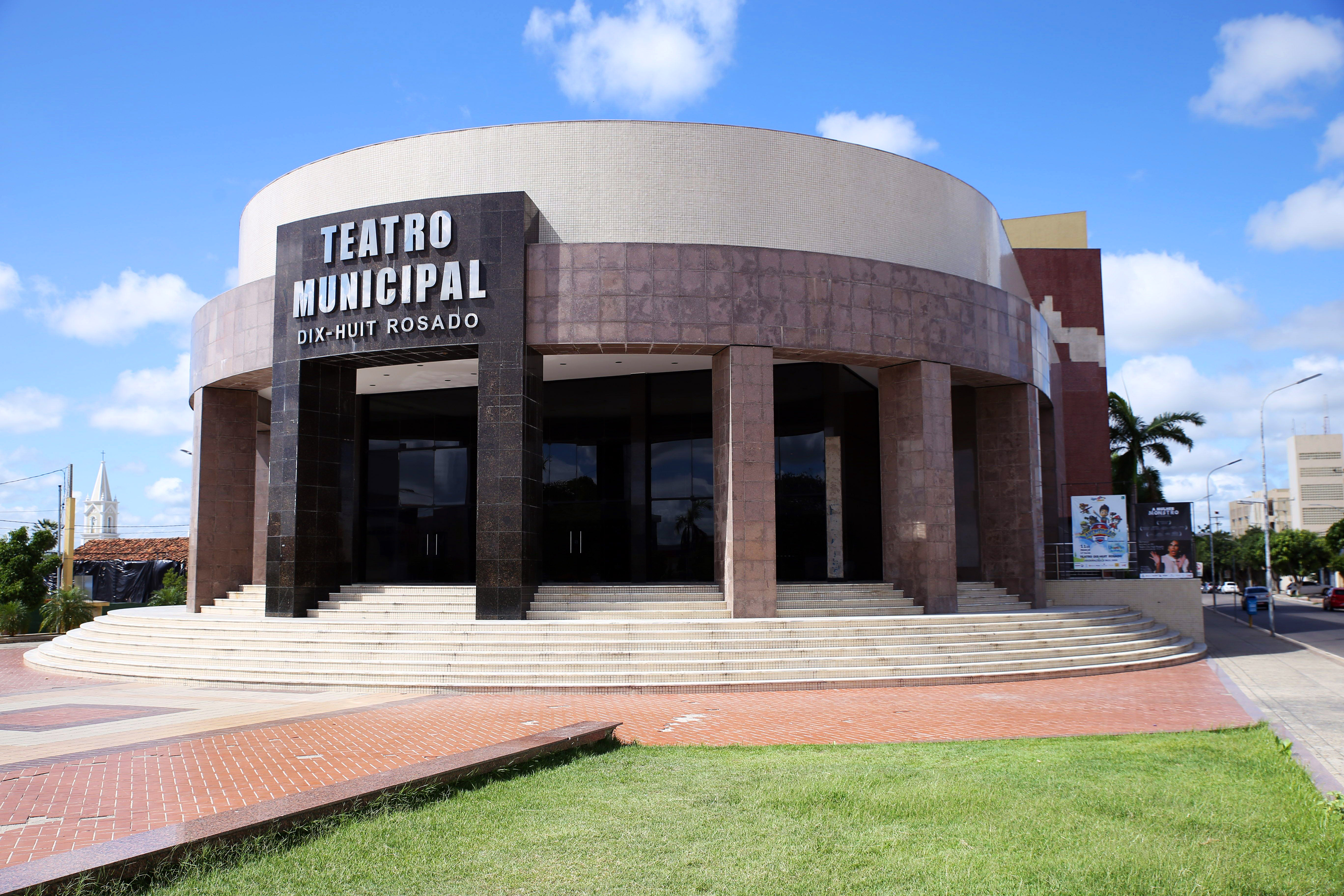
Dix-Huit Rosado Municipal Theater

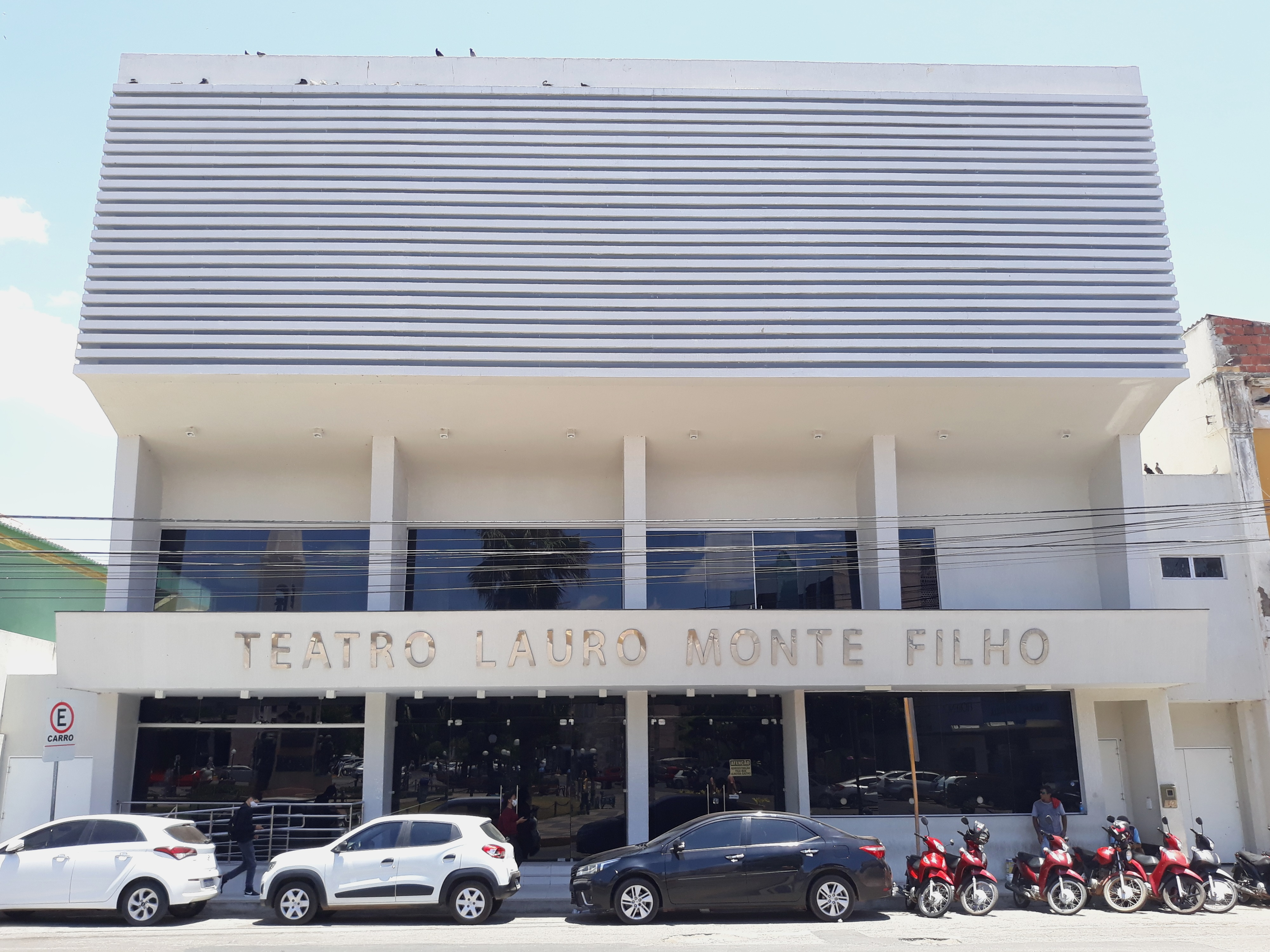
Lauro Monte Filho Theater

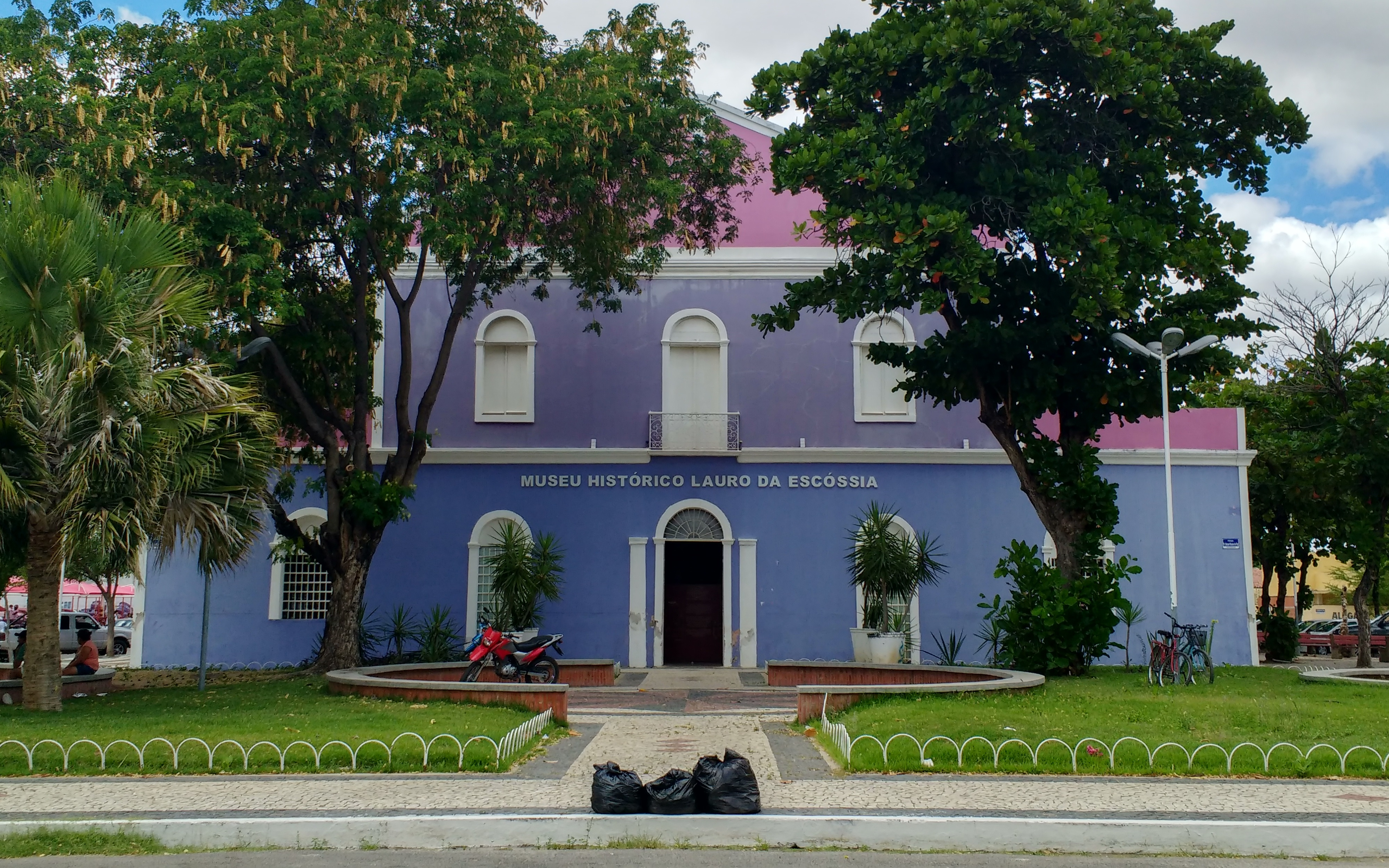
Journalist Lauro da Escóssia Municipal Museum

=== Events ===
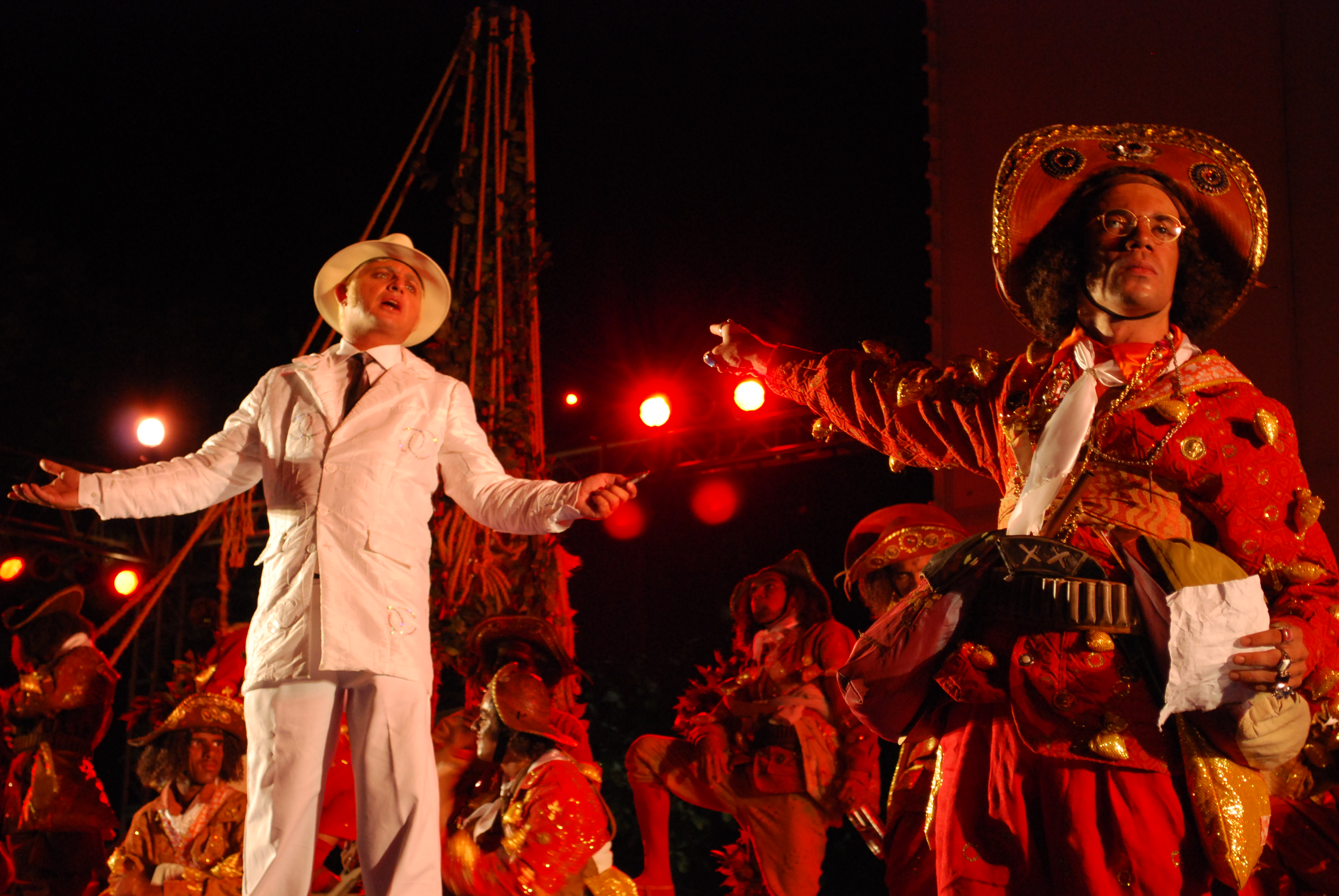
"Bullet Rain in the Land of Mossoró" performance, held during Mossoró Cidade Junina

The Mossoró Cidade Junina, one of the largest June festivals in Northeast Brazil, attracting over one million tourists, has been held since 1996 at the Arts Station throughout June. It features quadrilha performances, musical shows, food stalls with typical dishes, and cultural projects. During the event, the theatrical performance Bullet Rain in the Land of Mossoró recounts the story of Lampião and his gang's 1927 invasion, performed since 2003 in front of the São Vicente Chapel, the site of the clashes between the gang and the local population.

The Feast of Saint Lucy is one of the main religious events in Rio Grande do Norte, held in December in front of the cathedral. It begins on 3 December with an opening mass, followed by nine nights of novenas. During the festival, the Saint Lucy Oratory, a theatrical performance depicting the life of Saint Lucy, is staged after the novenas. Other events include the Saint Lucy Cavalcade, the Light Pedalling, the Light Motorcycle Pilgrimage, and musical performances. The festivities conclude on 13 December with masses and a traditional procession, attracting up to 100,000 devotees from Mossoró and beyond. Through state law 10,114, enacted on 7 October 2016, the festival was recognized as a cultural, historical, and intangible heritage of Rio Grande do Norte.

Other significant events in Mossoró's cultural calendar include: the Goat Festival, held at the Armando Buá Exhibition Park by the Rio Grande do Norte state government in partnership with the municipal government and local associations. Its program features exhibitions of cattle, goats, sheep, and pigs, as well as artisanal products, a gastronomic festival, artistic performances, and other attractions; the Western Region Industrial and Commercial Fair (FICRO), which has been held since 1987 and is organized by the Mossoró Commercial and Industrial Association (ACIM); the Mossoró Book Fair, a reading promotion event held since 2005, featuring book exhibitions and a diverse program; the International Fair of Irrigated Tropical Horticulture (Expofruit), the main event for irrigated horticulture in Brazil, with participation from numerous national and international companies; and the Freedom Act, the main theatrical performance held during the Freedom Festival at the end of September, which commemorates three of Mossoró's four libertarian acts: the Women's Revolt (1875), the abolition of slavery (1883), and the first female vote (1927), alongside parades and musical performances.

=== Sports ===
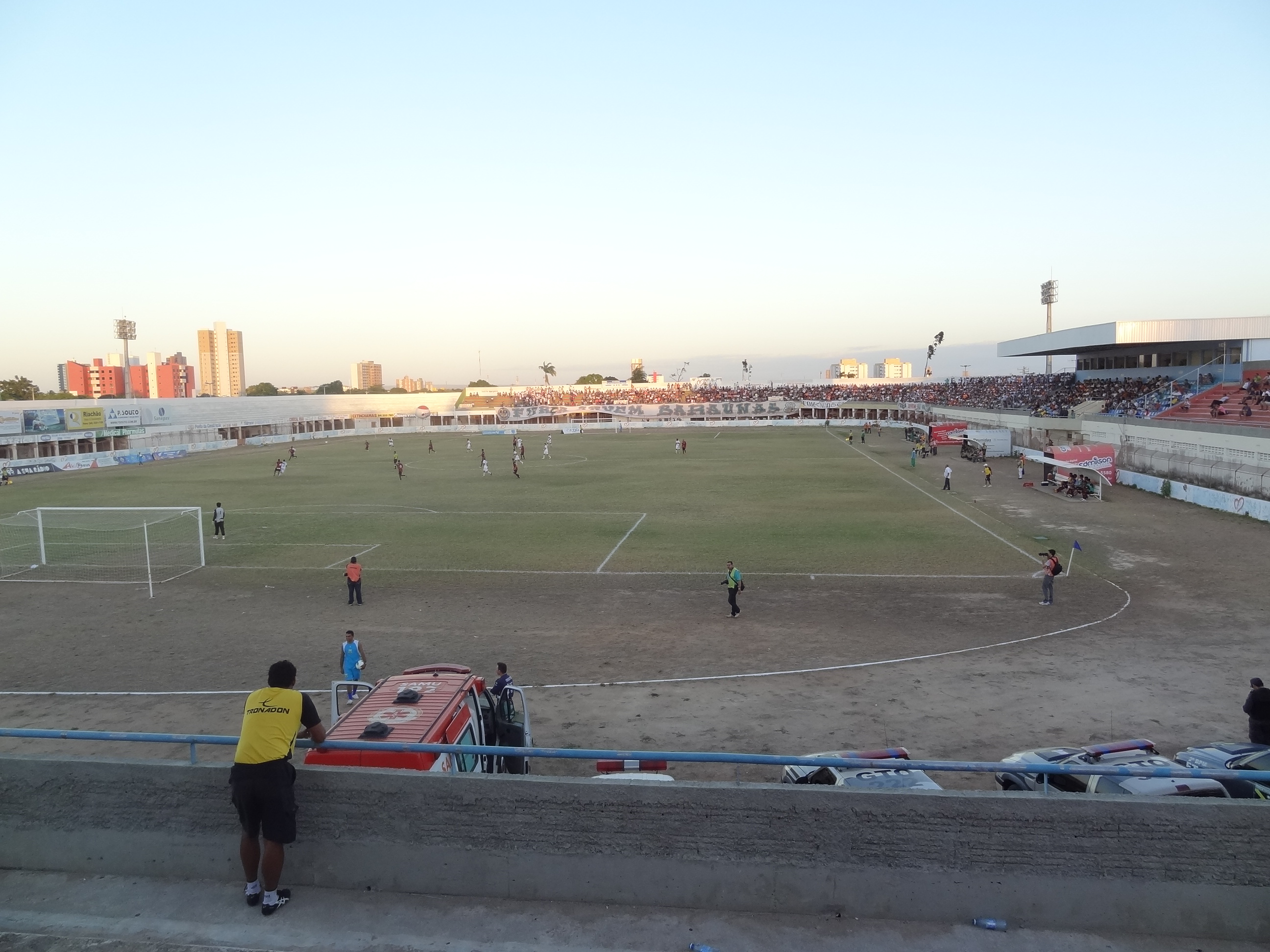
A match between Baraúnas de Mossoró and Campinense (from Campina Grande, Paraíba) at the Nogueirão during the 2012 Campeonato Brasileiro Série D. Baraúnas won 2–0.

The first football club in Mossoró was Humaitá Futebol Clube, founded on 14 October 1919. The city is home to the Estádio Leonardo Nogueira, popularly known as Nogueirão, established on 25 January 1922, which serves as the home stadium for two traditional local football clubs: Associação Cultural e Desportiva Potiguar (Potiguar de Mossoró) and Associação Cultural Esporte Clube Baraúnas (Baraúnas). The former has won two titles (2004 and 2013) and secured three runner-up positions (1997, 2006, and 2008) in the Campeonato Potiguar, while the latter has one title (2006) and two runner-up positions (1981 and 1987).

Several sports events are held annually in Mossoró, including the Governador Dix-Sept Rosado Cycling Race, a cycling race held since 1949 across various categories, making it one of Brazil's oldest cycling events. Originally conducted on a route between Governador Dix-Sept Rosado (then a district, now a municipality) and Mossoró, it is now held solely within the city's urban streets. Another notable event is the Municipal School Games (JEM's), which brings together various sports and involves students from multiple schools in the municipality, aiming to promote engagement in sports.

The municipal government also closes the Cultural Corridor on Sundays to facilitate sports activities such as walking, cycling, inline skating, and skateboarding, and has adapted several public squares for sports, including the Praça do Inocoop and the Praça do Rotary Club.

The city also features the Engenheiro Pedro Ciarlini Neto Sports Gymnasium (sports complex), the Sports Square (multi-sport square), and the Skateboard Square, as well as a BMX track at the Praça Maria de Lourdes Fernandes Moreira in Ulrick Graff, a motocross track in Alto da Pelonha, and a go-kart track in the Cidade Nova neighborhood. Additionally, various facilities for seven-a-side football and health clubs are spread throughout the city.

=== Leisure areas ===
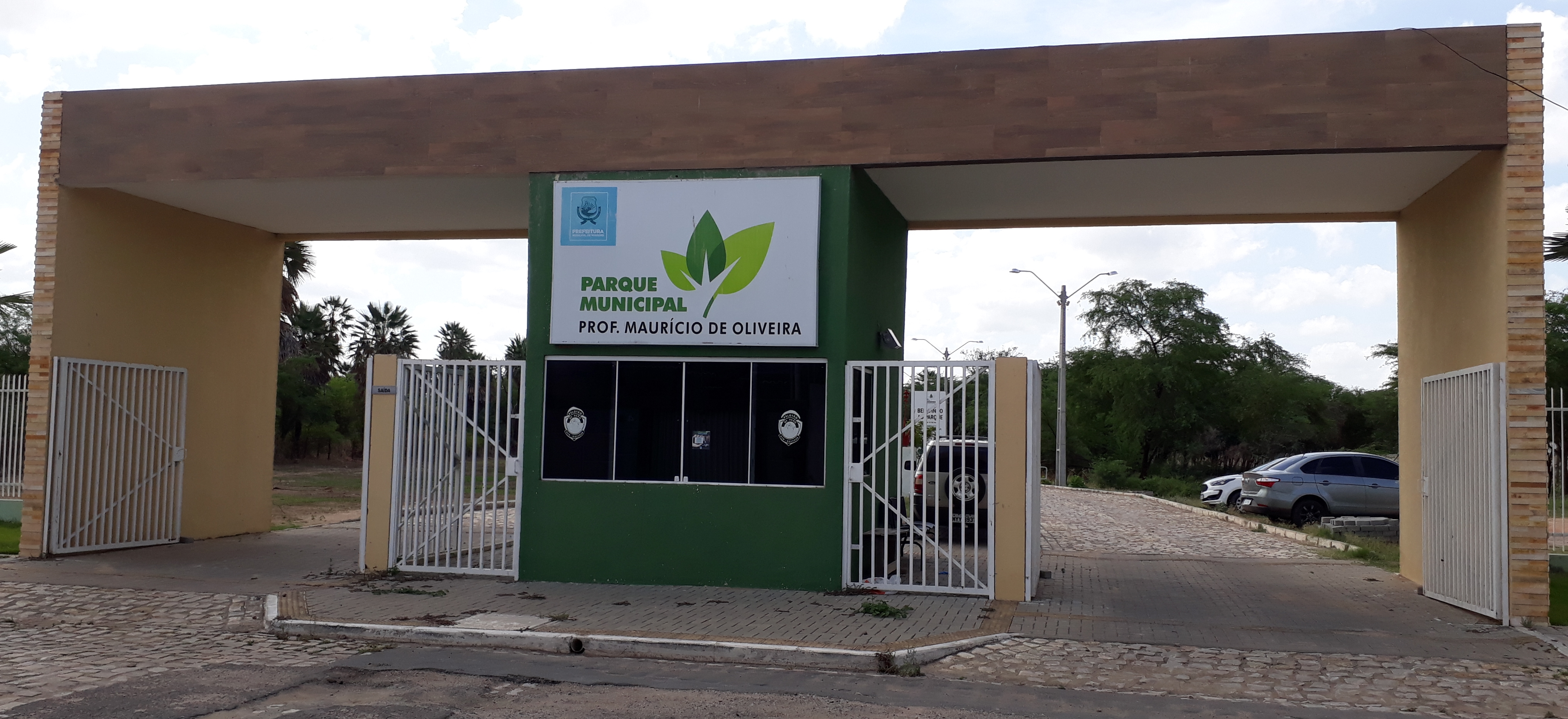
Professor Maurício de Oliveira Municipal Park

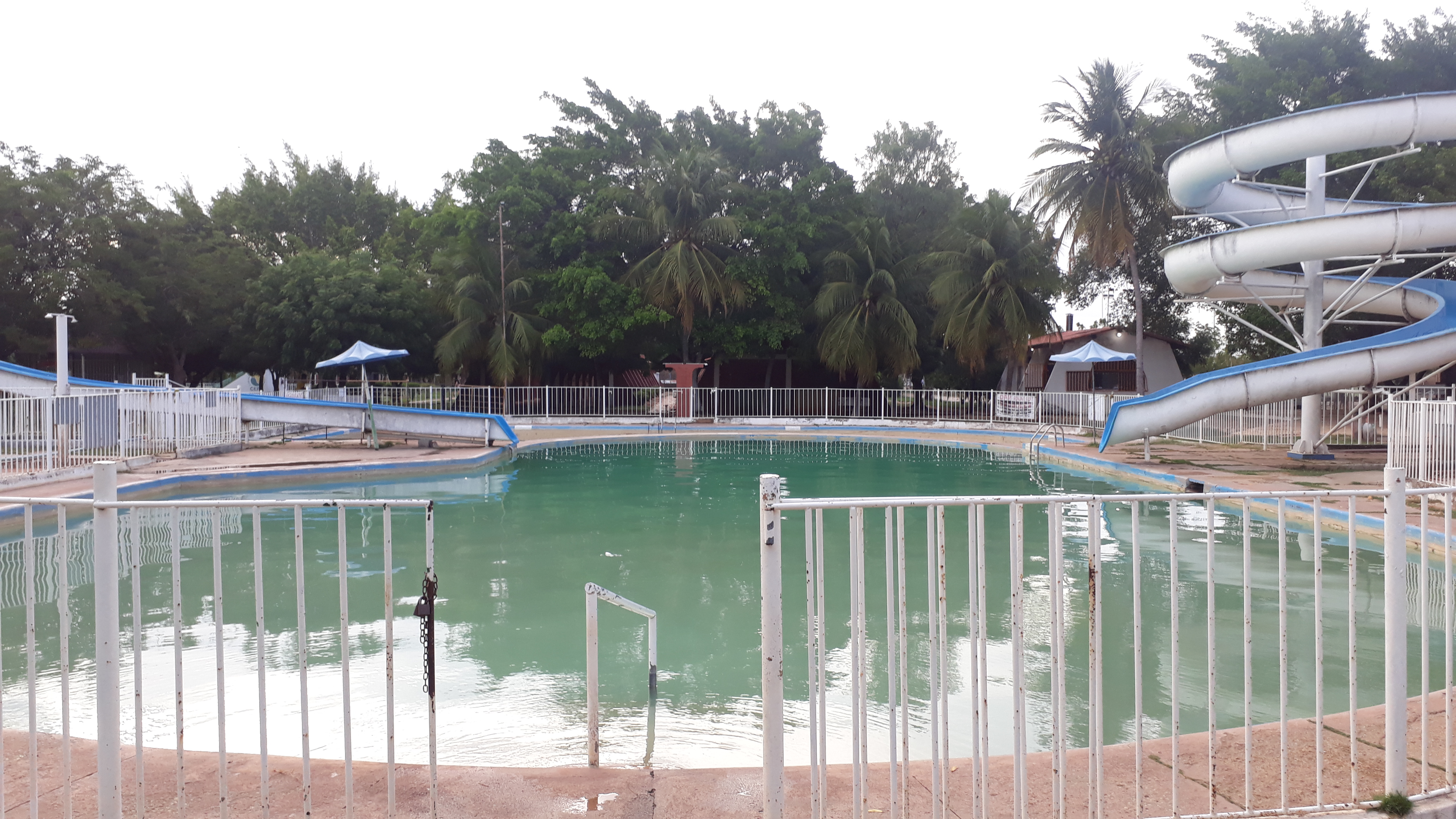
One of the pools at CEPE Mossoró (ASPETRO)

The municipality of Mossoró offers several leisure facilities, including the AABB, Assec, CEPE Mossoró (ASPETRO), Clube da Caixa, Clube da Cosern, Garbos Trade Hotel, Hotel e Resort Thermas, Hotel VillaOeste, Parque Municipal Professor Maurício de Oliveira, Praça das Crianças, SESC, SESI, SEST, Sindicato dos Bancários, and SINDPREVS, as well as numerous public squares scattered throughout the municipality, such as the Praça do Rotary Club. Additionally, every year during the festivities of Saint Lucy in December, the city hosts an amusement park, which in recent years has been set up along the Cultural Corridor.

== See also ==
- List of cities
- List of major cities in Brazil
- List of municipalities of Brazil
- Municipalities of Rio Grande do Norte (RN)
