= Açu, Rio Grande do Norte =

Municipality in Rio Grande do Norte, Brazil

Assu
- Municipality
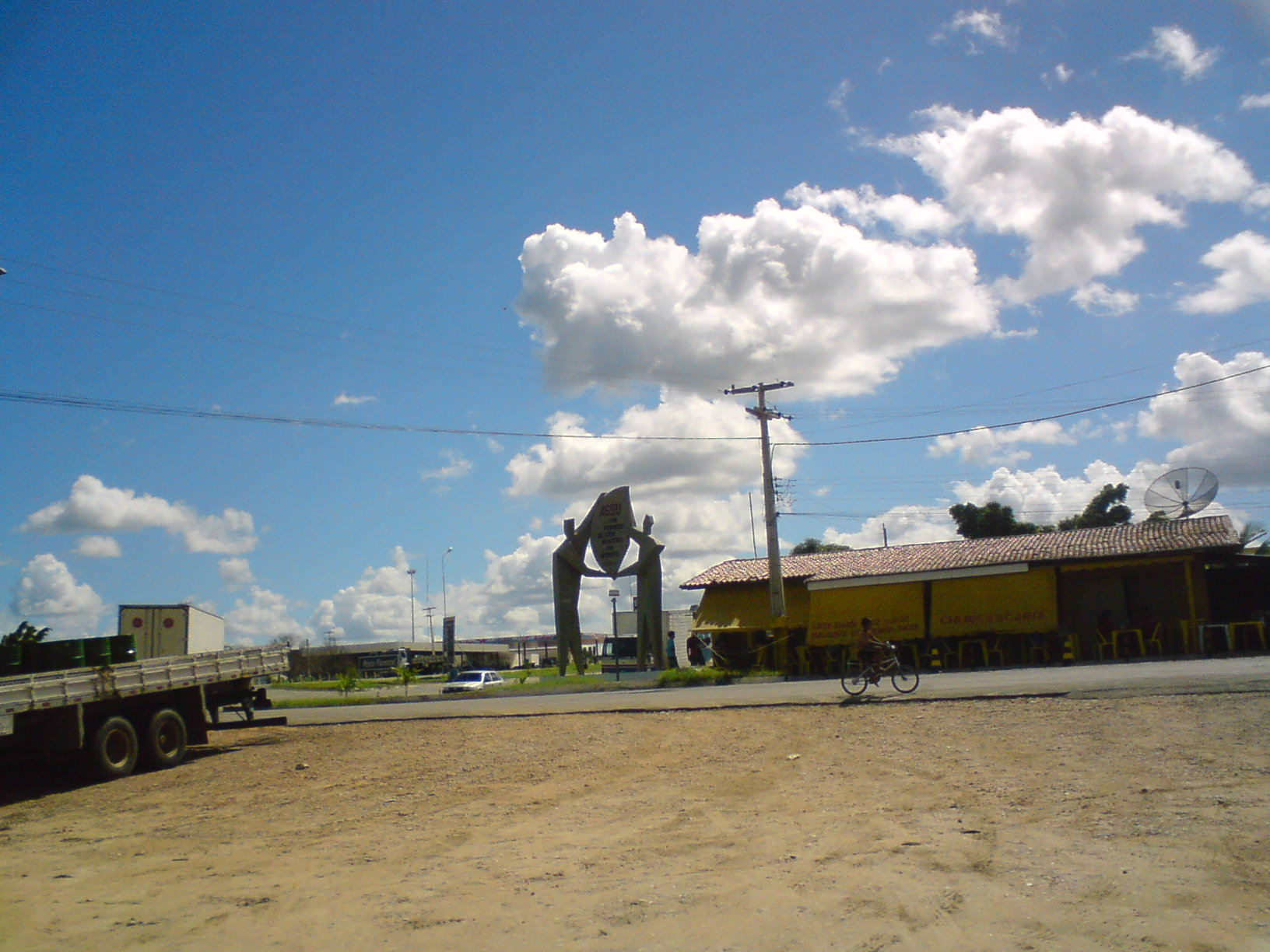

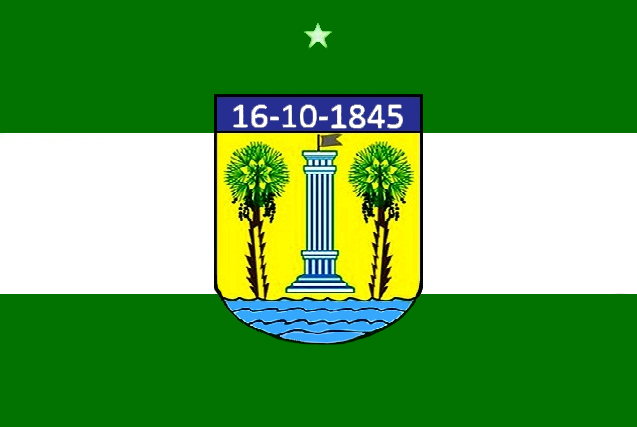
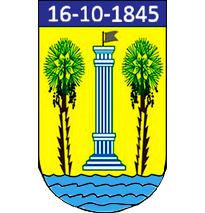
- Flag Coat of arms

- Location in Rio Grande do Norte state

- Location in Brazil
- Coordinates: 5°34′37″S 36°54′32″W
- Country: Brazil
- Region: Northeast
- State: Rio Grande do Norte

Area
  - Total: 1,303 km^{2} (503 sq mi)

Population (2022)
  - Total: 56,496
  - Density: 43.36/km^{2} (112.3/sq mi)
- Time zone: UTC-03:00 (BRT)

Açu or Assu is a municipality in the state of Rio Grande do Norte in Brazil. With an area of 1,303.442 square kilometers (503.262 sq mi), of which 16.3237 square kilometres (6.3026 sq mi) is urban, it is located 190 km from Natal, the state capital, and 1,653 km from Brasília, the federal capital. Its population in the 2022 demographic census was 56,496 inhabitants, according to the Brazilian Institute of Geography and Statistics (IBGE), ranking as the ninth most populous municipality in the state of Rio Grande do Norte.

== Geography ==
The territory of Açu covers 1,303.442 square kilometers (503.262 sq mi), of which 16.3237 square kilometres (6.3026 sq mi) constitutes the urban area. It sits at an average altitude of 27 meters above sea level. Açu borders these municipalities: to the north, Carnaubais and Serra do Mel; to the south, São Rafael, Paraú, and Jucurutu; to the east, Ipanguaçu, Alto do Rodrigues, Afonso Bezerra, and Itajá; and to the west, Upanema, Mossoró, and Paraú. The city is located 190 km from the state capital Natal, and 1,653 km from the federal capital Brasília.

Under the territorial division established in 2017 by the Brazilian Institute of Geography and Statistics (IBGE), the municipality belongs to the immediate geographical region of Açu, within the intermediate region of Mossoró. Previously, under the microregion and mesoregion divisions, it was part of the microregion of Vale do Açu in the mesoregion of Oeste Potiguar. The municipality contains the Açu National Forest, a 218 hectares (540 acres) sustainable use conservation unit that was originally established as a forest park in 1950.

== Demographics ==
In the 2022 census, the municipality had a population of 56,496 inhabitants and ranked only ninth in the state that year (out of 167 municipalities), with 51.38% female and 48.62% male, resulting in a sex ratio of 94,64 (9,464 men for every 10,000 women), compared to 53,227 inhabitants in the 2010 census (73.95% living in the urban area), when it held the eighth state position. Between the 2010 and 2022 censuses, the population of Açu changed at an annual geometric growth rate of 0.5%. Regarding age group in the 2022 census, 70.65% of the inhabitants were between 15 and 64 years old, 19.88% were under fifteen, and 9.49% were 65 or older. The population density in 2022 was 43.34 inhabitants per square kilometer, with an average of 2.93 inhabitants per household.

The municipality's Human Development Index (HDI-M) is considered medium, according to data from the United Nations Development Programme. According to the 2010 report published in 2013, its value was 0.661, ranking 18th in the state and 2,870th nationally (out of 5,565 municipalities), and the Gini coefficient rose from 0.44 in 2003 to 0.53 in 2010. Considering only the longevity index, its value is 0.795, the income index is 0.641, and the education index is 0.568.
