= Microregion of Serra de São Miguel =

Coordinates: 6°12′43″S 38°29′49″W

Serra de São Miguel
- Microregion
- Country: Brazil
- State: Rio Grande do Norte
- Mesoregion: Oeste Potiguar

Serra de São Miguel was a microregion in the Brazilian state of Rio Grande do Norte.

== Municipalities ==
The microregion consisted of the following municipalities:

- Água Nova
- Coronel João Pessoa
- Doutor Severiano
- Ecnanto
- Luís Gomes
- Major Sales
- Riacho de Santana
- São Miguel
- Venha-Ver
