= Microregion of Vale do Açu =

Coordinates: 5°34′37″S 36°54′32″W

Vale do Açu
- Microregion
- Country: Brazil
- State: Rio Grande do Norte
- Mesoregion: Oeste Potiguar

Vale do Açu was a microregion in the Brazilian state of Rio Grande do Norte.

== Municipalities ==
The microregion consisted of the following municipalities:

- Alto do Rodrigues
- Assu
- Carnaubais
- Ipanguaçu
- Itajá
- Jucurutu
- Pendências
- Porto do Mangue
- São Rafael
