= Coronel João Pessoa =

Municipality in Rio Grande do Norte, Brazil

- Municipality
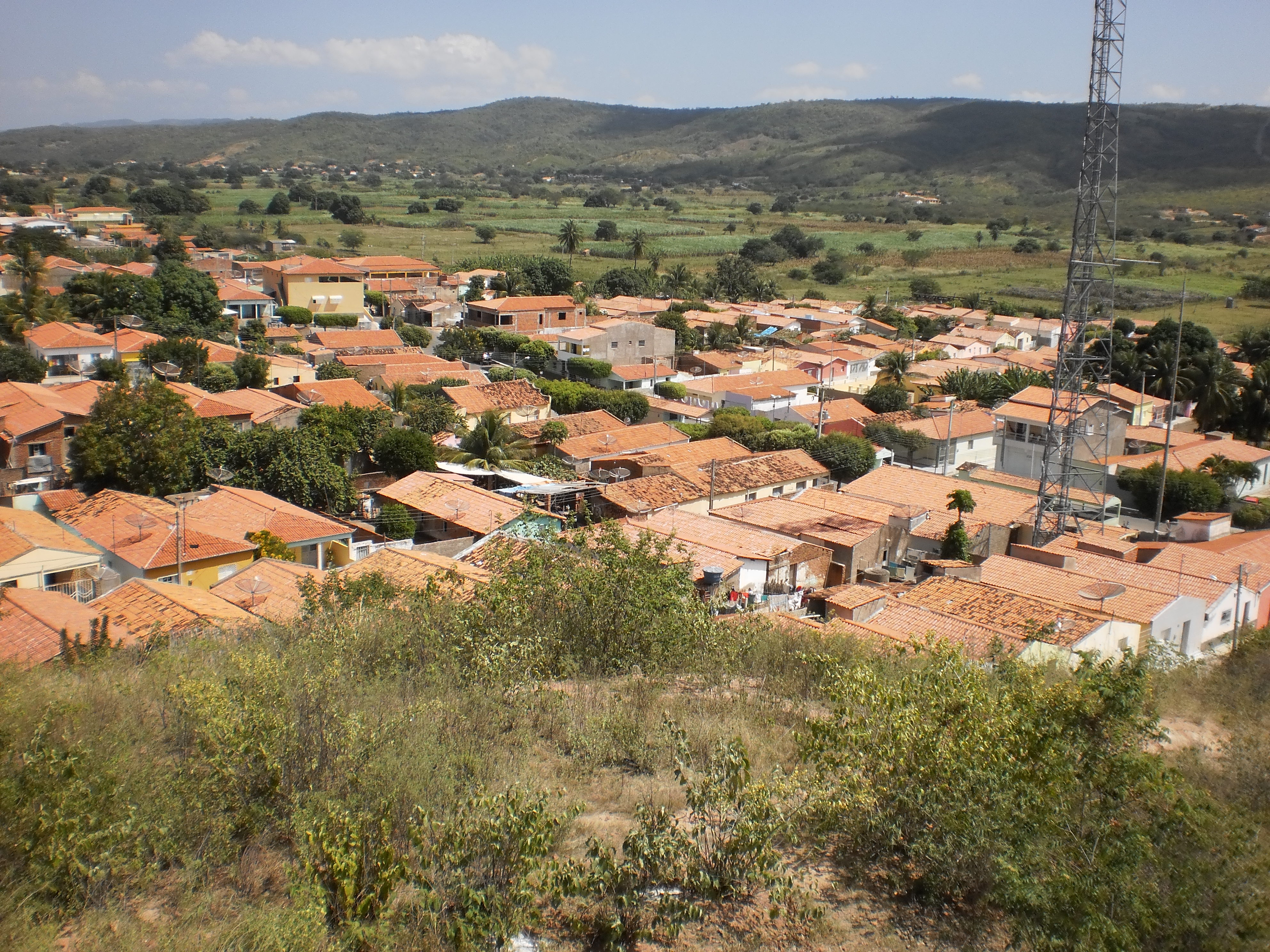

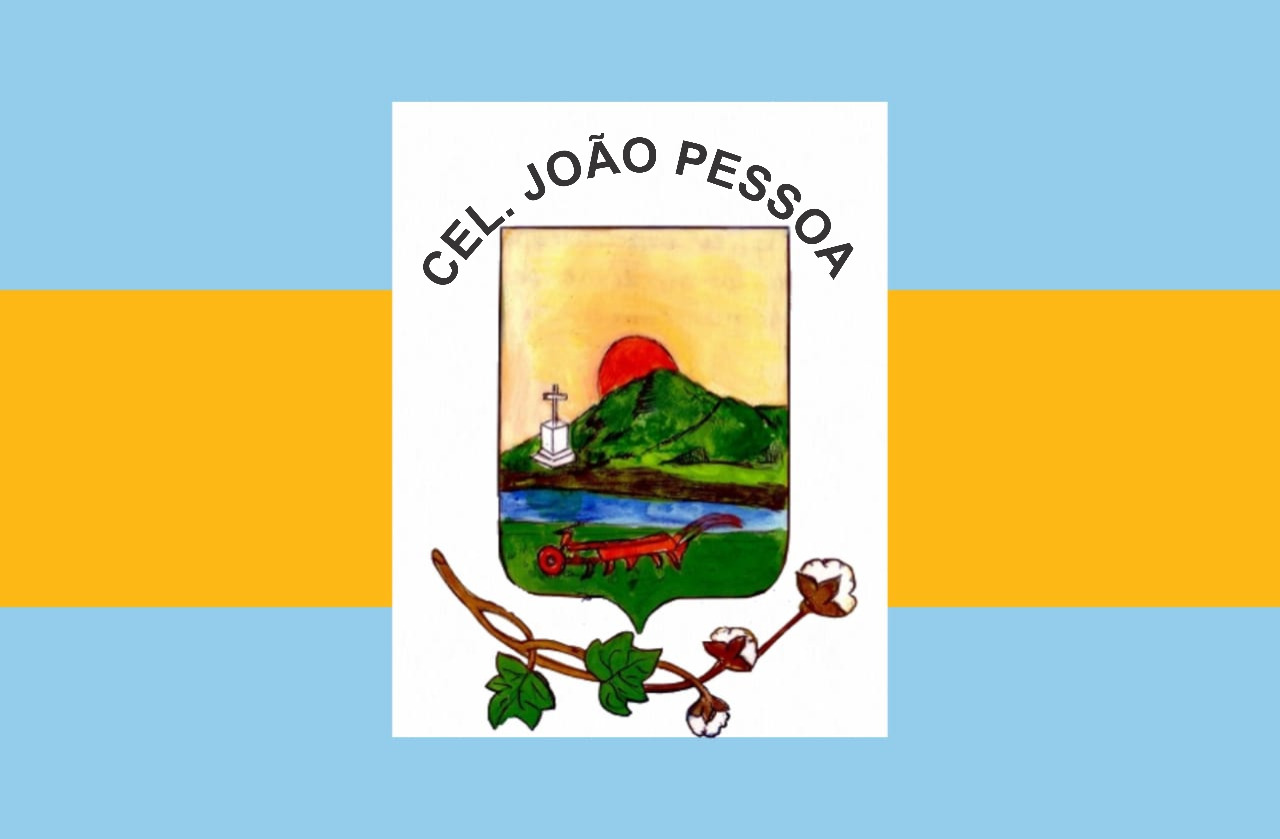
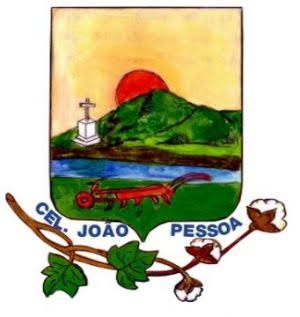
- Flag Coat of arms

- Location in Brazil
- Coordinates: 6°16′S 38°29′W
- Country: Brazil
- Region: Nordeste
- State: Rio Grande do Norte
- Mesoregion: Oeste Potiguar

Population (2022)
  - Total: 4,237
- Time zone: UTC -3

Coronel João Pessoa is a municipality in the Brazilian state of Rio Grande do Norte. With an area of 117.139 square kilometers (45.228 sq mi), of which 1.6622 square kilometres (0.6418 sq mi) is urban, it is located 361 km from Natal, the state capital, and 1,480 km from Brasília, the federal capital. Its population in the 2022 demographic census was 4,237 inhabitants, according to the Brazilian Institute of Geography and Statistics (IBGE), ranking as the 128th most populous municipality in the state of Rio Grande do Norte.

== Geography ==
The territory of Coronel João Pessoa covers 117.139 square kilometers (45.228 sq mi), of which 1.6622 square kilometres (0.6418 sq mi) constitutes the urban area. It sits at an average altitude of 401 meters above sea level. Coronel João Pessoa borders these municipalities: to the north, São Miguel and Encanto; to the south, Venha-Ver and Luís Gomes; to the east, Riacho de Santana and Água Nova; and to the west, São Miguel and Venha-Ver. The city is located 361 km from the state capital Natal, and 1,480 km from the federal capital Brasília.

Under the territorial division established in 2017 by the Brazilian Institute of Geography and Statistics (IBGE), the municipality belongs to the immediate geographical region of Pau dos Ferros, within the intermediate region of Mossoró. Previously, under the microregion and mesoregion divisions, it was part of the microregion of Serra de São Miguel in the mesoregion of Oeste Potiguar.

== Demographics ==
In the 2022 census, the municipality had a population of 4,237 inhabitants and ranked 128th in the state that year (out of 167 municipalities), with 50.37% male and 49.63% female, resulting in a sex ratio of 101.47 (10,147 men for every 10,000 women). In the 2010 census, the municipality had 4,772 inhabitants with 37.24% living in the urban area, when it held the 119th state position. Between the 2010 and 2022 censuses, the population of Coronel João Pessoa changed at an annual geometric growth rate of -0.99%. Regarding age group in the 2022 census, 68.32% of the inhabitants were between 15 and 64 years old, 19.18% were under fifteen, and 12.5% were 65 or older. The population density in 2022 was 36.17 inhabitants per square kilometer. There were 1,439 housing units with an average of 2.94 inhabitants per household.

The municipality's Human Development Index (HDI-M) was considered medium, according to data from the United Nations Development Programme (UNDP). According to the 2010 report published in 2013, its value was 0.578, ranking 4,670th nationally (out of 5,565 municipalities), and the Gini coefficient rose from 0.41 in 2003 to 0.5 in 2010. Considering only the longevity index, its value is 0.748, the income index is 0.549, and the education index is 0.471.

== See also ==
- List of municipalities in Rio Grande do Norte
