= Campo Grande, Rio Grande do Norte =

Municipality in Rio Grande do Norte, Brazil

Coordinates: 5.86389°S 37.31°W

Campo Grande
- Municipality
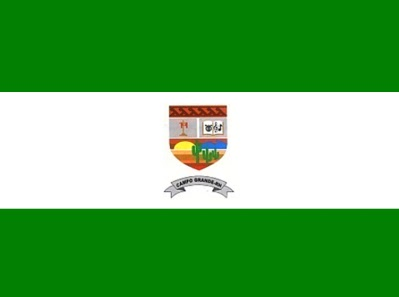
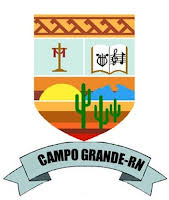
- Flag Coat of arms

- Country: Brazil
- Region: Nordeste
- State: Rio Grande do Norte
- Mesoregion: Oeste Potiguar

Population (2022)
  - Total: 9,730
- Time zone: UTC -3

Campo Grande, formerly Augusto Severo, is a municipality in the state of Rio Grande do Norte in the Northeast region of Brazil. With an area of 890.890 square kilometers (343.975 sq mi), of which 1.9053 square kilometres (0.7356 sq mi) is urban, it is located 68 km from Natal, the state capital, and 1,734 km from Brasília, the federal capital. Its population in the 2022 demographic census was 9,730 inhabitants, according to the Brazilian Institute of Geography and Statistics (IBGE), ranking as the 73rd most populous municipality in the state of Rio Grande do Norte.

== History ==
The first known inhabitants of the Serra da Capilhada region were the Pêga Indigenous people. By 1750, the area was known as Campo Grande, a reference to the vast grasslands located on the left bank of the Upanema River. Around this time, a Portuguese settler named Gondim established the first cattle farms in the region.

In 1761, Sergeant Major João do Vale Bezerra purchased the lands of Serra da Capilhada—previously owned by Gondim—at a public auction. This acquisition marked the beginning of the settlement of Campo Grande and led to the renaming of the local mountain as Serra de João do Vale, in his honor. Residences were built for Bezerra's family and descendants, and a chapel was erected in devotion to Our Lady of Sant'Ana.

The municipality of Campo Grande was officially created by Law No. 114 on 14 September 1858. However, due to political interests, this law was repealed in 1868, and Campo Grande was downgraded to a district within the newly established municipality of Caraúbas.

Law No. 613 of 30 March 1870 restored its municipal status under the name Triunfo. On 28 August 1903, Law No. 192—introduced by Deputy Luís Pereira Tito Jácome—renamed the municipality Augusto Severo after noted Brazilian aeronaut Augusto Severo de Albuquerque Maranhão (1864–1902), who died in a fiery dirigible crash in Paris, France. On 6 December 1991, through Law No. 155, the municipality's original name, Campo Grande, was officially reinstated.

== Geography ==
The territory of Campo Grande covers 890.890 square kilometers (343.975 sq mi), of which 1.9053 square kilometres (0.7356 sq mi) constitutes the urban area. It sits at an average altitude of 96 meters above sea level. Campo Grande borders these municipalities: to the north, Upanema; to the south, Janduís and Belém do Brejo do Cruz; to the east, Triunfo Potiguar and Paraú; and to the west, Caraúbas, Janduís, and Upanema. The city is located 233 km from the state capital Natal, and 1,599 km from the federal capital Brasília.

Under the territorial division established in 2017 by the Brazilian Institute of Geography and Statistics (IBGE), the municipality belongs to the immediate geographical region of Mossoró, within the intermediate region of Mossoró. Previously, under the microregion and mesoregion divisions, it was part of the microregion of Médio Oeste in the mesoregion of Oeste Potiguar.

== Demographics ==
In the 2022 census, the municipality had a population of 9,730 inhabitants and ranked 73rd in the state that year (out of 167 municipalities), with 50.85% male and 49.15% female, resulting in a sex ratio of 103.47 (10,347 men for every 10,000 women), compared to 9,289 inhabitants in the 2010 census (52.85% living in the urban area), when it held the 72nd state position. Between the 2010 and 2022 censuses, the population of Campo Grande changed at an annual geometric growth rate of 0.39%. Regarding age group in the 2022 census, 70.79% of the inhabitants were between 15 and 64 years old, 17.52% were under fifteen, and 11.69% were 65 or older. The population density in 2022 was 10.92 inhabitants per square kilometer. There were 3,233 housing units with an average of 3.01 inhabitants per household.

The municipality's Human Development Index (HDI-M) was considered medium, according to data from the United Nations Development Programme (UNDP). According to the 2010 report published in 2013, its value was 0.621, ranking 56th in the state and 3,680th nationally (out of 5,565 municipalities), and the Gini coefficient rose from 0.42 in 2003 to 0.68 in 2010. Considering only the longevity index, its value is 0.774, the income index is 0.624, and the education index is 0.495.

== See also ==
- List of municipalities in Rio Grande do Norte
