= Microregion of Médio Oeste =

Coordinates: 5°38′31″S 37°15′28″W

Médio Oeste
- Microregion
- Country: Brazil
- State: Rio Grande do Norte
- Mesoregion: Oeste Potiguar

Médio Oeste was a microregion in the Brazilian state of Rio Grande do Norte.

== Municipalities ==
The microregion consisted of the following municipalities:

- Campo Grande
- Janduís
- Messias Targino
- Paraú
- Triunfo Potiguar
- Upanema
