= Carnaubais =

Municipality in Rio Grande do Norte, Brazil

- Municipality
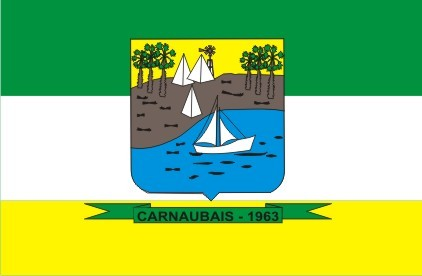
- Flag

- Location in Brazil
- Coordinates: 5°21′S 36°50′W
- Country: Brazil
- Region: Nordeste
- State: Rio Grande do Norte
- Mesoregion: Oeste Potiguar

Population (2022)
  - Total: 9,714
- Time zone: UTC -3

Carnaubais is a municipality in the state of Rio Grande do Norte in the Northeast region of Brazil. With an area of 517.737 square kilometers (199.899 sq mi), of which 4.1227 square kilometres (1.5918 sq mi) is urban, it is located 187 km from Natal, the state capital, and 1,678 km from Brasília, the federal capital. Its population in the 2022 demographic census was 9,714 inhabitants, according to the Brazilian Institute of Geography and Statistics (IBGE), ranking as the 74th most populous municipality in the state of Rio Grande do Norte.

== Geography ==
The territory of Carnaubais covers 517.737 square kilometers (199.899 sq mi), of which 4.1227 square kilometres (1.5918 sq mi) constitutes the urban area. It sits at an average altitude of 30 meters above sea level. Carnaubais borders these municipalities: to the north, Porto do Mangue and Serra do Mel; to the south, Alto do Rodrigues and Açu; to the east, Alto do Rodrigues, Pendências, and Macau; and to the west, Serra do Mel e Açu. The city is located 187 km from the state capital Natal, and 1,678 km from the federal capital Brasília.

Under the territorial division established in 2017 by the Brazilian Institute of Geography and Statistics (IBGE), the municipality belongs to the immediate geographical region of Açi, within the intermediate region of Mossoró. Previously, under the microregion and mesoregion divisions, it was part of the microregion of Vale do Açu in the mesoregion of Oeste Potiguar.

== Demographics ==
In the 2022 census, the municipality had a population of 9,714 inhabitants and ranked 74th in the state that year (out of 167 municipalities), with 50.29% male and 49.71% female, resulting in a sex ratio of 101.16 (10,116 men for every 10,000 women), compared to 9,762 inhabitants in the 2010 census (48.73% living in the urban area), when it held the 68th state position. Between the 2010 and 2022 censuses, the population of Carnaubais changed at an annual geometric growth rate of 0.19%. Regarding age group in the 2022 census, 70.22% of the inhabitants were between 15 and 64 years old, 28.31% were under fifteen, and 9.35% were 65 or older. The population density in 2022 was 18.76 inhabitants per square kilometer. There were 3,234 housing units with an average of 2.99 inhabitants per household.

The municipality's Human Development Index (HDI-M) was considered low, according to data from the United Nations Development Programme (UNDP). According to the 2010 report published in 2013, its value was 0.589, ranking 118th in the state and 4,416th nationally (out of 5,565 municipalities), and the Gini coefficient rose from 0.39 in 2003 to 0.54 in 2010. Considering only the longevity index, its value is 0.738, the income index is 0.583, and the education index is 0.476.

== See also ==
- List of municipalities in Rio Grande do Norte
