= João Pessoa =

João Pessoa may refer to:

- João Pessoa (politician) (1878–1930), governor of Paraíba, Brazil
- João Pessoa, Paraíba, state capital of Paraíba, named after the governor
- João Pessoa Airport (Presidente Castro Pinto International Airport), serving João Pessoa, Paraíba, Brazil
- Coronel João Pessoa, a town in Rio Grande do Norte, Brazil
- Vila João Pessoa, Porto Alegre, a neighborhood in the city of Porto Alegre, Brazil
