= Alto do Rodrigues =

Municipality in Rio Grande do Norte, Brazil

Coordinates: 5°17′S 36°46′W

- Municipality
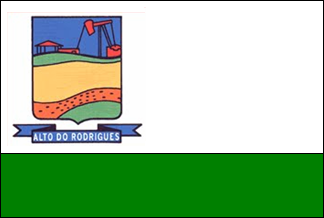
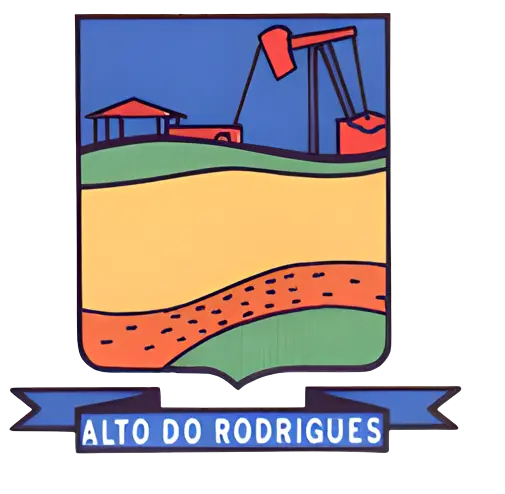
- Flag Coat of arms
- Interactive map of Alto do Rodrigues
- Country: Brazil
- Region: Nordeste
- State: Rio Grande do Norte
- Mesoregion: Oeste Potiguar

Population (2022)
  - Total: 12,484
- Time zone: UTC -3

Alto do Rodrigues is a municipality in the state of Rio Grande do Norte in the Northeast region of Brazil. With an area of 191.334 square kilometers (73.874 sq mi), of which 4.6662 square kilometres (1.8016 sq mi) is urban, it is located 14 km from Natal, the state capital, and 1,767 km from Brasília, the federal capital. Its population in the 2022 demographic census was 12,484 inhabitants, according to the Brazilian Institute of Geography and Statistics (IBGE), ranking as the 42nd most populous municipality in the state of Rio Grande do Norte.

== Geography ==
The territory of Alto do Rodrigues covers 191.334 square kilometers (73.874 sq mi), of which 4.6662 square kilometres (1.8016 sq mi) constitutes the urban area. It sits at an average altitude of 13 meters above sea level. Alto do Rodrigues borders these municipalities: to the north, Carnaubais and Pendências; to the south, Afonso Bezerra; to the east, Pendências and Afonso Bezerra; and to the west, Carnaubais and Assu. The city is located 180 km from the state capital Natal, and 1,688 km from the federal capital Brasília.

Under the territorial division established in 2017 by the Brazilian Institute of Geography and Statistics (IBGE), the municipality belongs to the immediate geographical region of Açu, within the intermediate region of Mossoró. Previously, under the microregion and mesoregion divisions, it was part of the microregion of Vale do Açu in the mesoregion of Oeste Potiguar.

== Demographics ==
In the 2022 census, the municipality had a population of 12,484 inhabitants and ranked only 42nd in the state that year (out of 167 municipalities), with 51.25% female and 48.75% male, resulting in a sex ratio of 95.12 (9,512 men for every 10,000 women), compared to 12,305 inhabitants in the 2010 census (72.11% living in the urban area), when it held the 45th state position. Between the 2010 and 2022 censuses, the population of Alto do Rodrigues changed at an annual geometric growth rate of 0.12%. Regarding age group in the 2022 census, 70.36% of the inhabitants were between 15 and 64 years old, 20.86% were under fifteen, and 8.78% were 65 or older. The population density in 2022 was 65.25 inhabitants per square kilometer, with an average of 2.96 inhabitants per household.

The municipality's Human Development Index (HDI-M) is considered medium, according to data from the United Nations Development Programme. According to the 2010 report published in 2013, its value was 0.672, ranking 16th in the state and 2,870th nationally (out of 5,565 municipalities), and the Gini coefficient rose from 0.39 in 2003 to 0.48 in 2010. Considering only the longevity index, its value is 0.8, the income index is 0.647, and the education index is 0.585.

== See also ==
- List of municipalities in Rio Grande do Norte
