= Itajá =

Itajá may refer to the following places in Brazil:

- Itajá, Goiás
- Itajá, Rio Grande do Norte

== See also ==
- Itajaí, a municipality in the state of Santa Catarina, Brazil
