= Horto Florestal =

Horto Florestal, which means "botanical garden" in the Portuguese language, may refer to:

- Açu National Forest, a national forest in the state of Rio Grande do Norte, Brazil
- Albert Löfgren State Park, a botanical garden in the city of São Paulo, Brazil
- Campos do Jordão State Park, a park in the municipality of Campos do Jordão, São Paulo, Brazil
