= Caraúbas =

Caraúbas may refer to one of the following locations in Brazil:

- Caraúbas, Paraíba
- Caraúbas, Rio Grande do Norte
