= Mossoró (disambiguation) =

Mossoró is a Brazilian municipality.

Mossoró may also refer to:

- Microregion of Mossoró, Brazilian microregion in state of Rio Grande do Norte
- Mossoró Airport, Brazilian airport in Mossoró, Brazil
- Mossoró (footballer, born 1983), José Márcio da Costa, Brazilian football midfielder
- Mossoró (footballer, born 1985), João Batista Lima Gomes, Brazilian football striker
