= Caraúbas, Rio Grande do Norte =

Municipality in Rio Grande do Norte, Brazil

Coordinates: 5°47′34″S 37°33′25″W

Caraúbas
- Municipality
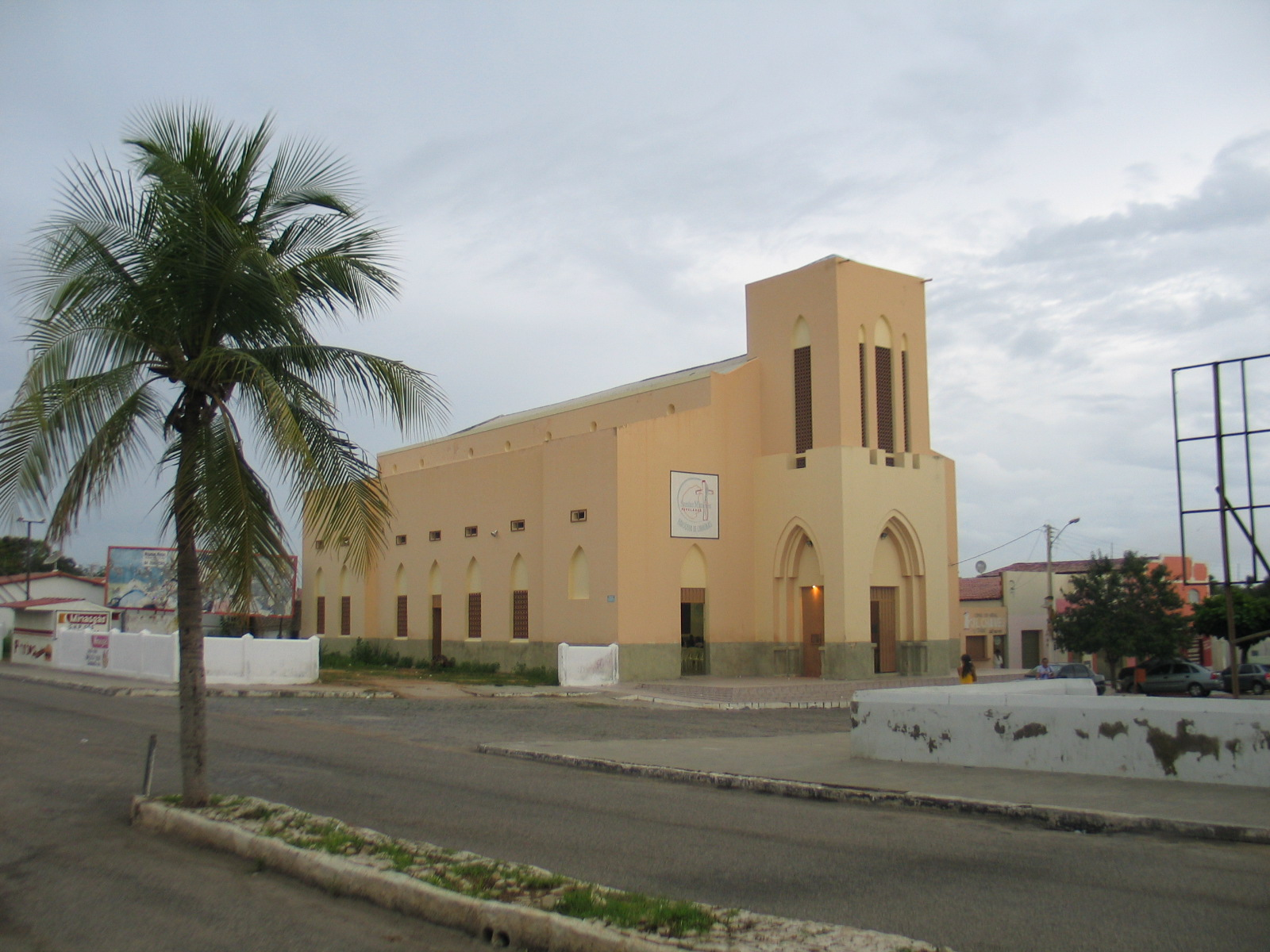

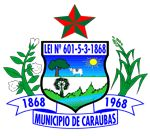
- Flag Coat of arms
- Interactive map of Caraúbas
- Country: Brazil
- Region: Nordeste
- State: Rio Grande do Norte
- Mesoregion: Oeste Potiguar
- Founder: Leandro Bezerra Cavalcante

Population (2022)
  - Total: 19,727
- Time zone: UTC -3

Caraúbas is a municipality in the state of Rio Grande do Norte in the Northeast region of Brazil. With an area of 1,094.488 square kilometers (422.584 sq mi), of which 5.1635 square kilometres (1.9936 sq mi) is urban, it is located 260 km from Natal, the state capital, and 1,586 km from Brasília, the federal capital. Its population in the 2022 demographic census was 19,727 inhabitants, according to the Brazilian Institute of Geography and Statistics (IBGE), ranking as the 28th most populous municipality in the state of Rio Grande do Norte.

== Geography ==
The territory of Caraúbas covers 1,094.488 square kilometers (422.584 sq mi), of which 5.1635 square kilometres (1.9936 sq mi) constitutes the urban area. It sits at an average altitude of 144 meters above sea level. Caraúbas borders these municipalities: to the north, Governador Dix-Sept Rosado and Felipe Guerra; to the south, Janduís, Patu, and Olho-d'Água do Borges; to the east, Campo Grande and Upanema; and to the west, Apodi and Felipe Guerra. The city is located 260 km from the state capital Natal, and 1,586 km from the federal capital Brasília.

Under the territorial division established in 2017 by the Brazilian Institute of Geography and Statistics (IBGE), the municipality belongs to the immediate geographical region of Mossoró, within the intermediate region of Mossoró. Previously, under the microregion and mesoregion divisions, it was part of the microregion of Chapada do Apodi in the mesoregion of Oeste Potiguar.

== Demographics ==
In the 2022 census, the municipality had a population of 19,727 inhabitants and ranked 28th in the state that year (out of 167 municipalities), with 51.19% female and 48.81% male, resulting in a sex ratio of 95,34 (9,534 men for every 10,000 women), compared to 19,576 inhabitants in the 2010 census (70% living in the urban area), when it held the 28th state position. Between the 2010 and 2022 censuses, the population of Caraúbas changed at an annual geometric growth rate of 0.06%. Regarding age group in the 2022 census, 69.45% of the inhabitants were between 15 and 64 years old, 17.59% were under fifteen, and 12.97% were 65 or older. The population density in 2022 was 18 inhabitants per square kilometer. There were 7,039 housing units with an average of 2.79 inhabitants per household.

The municipality's Human Development Index (HDI-M) was considered medium, according to data from the United Nations Development Programme (UNDP). According to the 2010 report published in 2013, its value was 0.638, ranking 33th in the state and 3,333th nationally (out of 5,565 municipalities), and the Gini coefficient rose from 0.38 in 2003 to 0.54 in 2010. Considering only the longevity index, its value is 0.786, the income index is 0.594, and the education index is 0.556.

== See also ==
- List of municipalities in Rio Grande do Norte
