= Microregion of Chapada do Apodi =

Coordinates: 5°39′50″S 37°47′56″W

Chapada do Apodi
- Microregion
- Country: Brazil
- State: Rio Grande do Norte
- Mesoregion: Oeste Potiguar

Chapada do Apodi was a microregion in the Brazilian state of Rio Grande do Norte.

== Municipalities ==
The microregion consisted of the following municipalities:

- Apodi
- Caraúbas
- Felipe Guerra
- Governador Dix-Sept Rosado
