= Jefinho (footballer, born 1994) =

Brazilian footballer

Personal information
- Full name: Jefesson Vieira Eufrazio
- Date of birth: 25 May 1994 (age 32)
- Place of birth: Triunfo Potiguar, Brazil
- Height: 1.90 m (6 ft 3 in)
- Position: Striker

Team information
- Current team: Votuporanguense
- Number: 9

Senior career*
Years	Team	Apps	(Gls)
2014–2017	ASSU	10	(0)
2017–2019	Potiguar	15	(13)
2019	ABC	15	(7)
2019–2020	Cuiabá	10	(3)
2020–2021	Operário Ferroviário	22	(4)
2020	→ Paysandu (loan)	5	(0)
2020–2021	→ Sampaio Corrêa (loan)	28	(8)
2021–2022	Ferroviária	9	(0)
2022	ABC	34	(7)
2023	Nejmeh	10	(5)
2023	Persik Kediri	7	(2)
2024	Figueirense	18	(6)
2025–	Votuporanguense	10	(1)
- * Club domestic league appearances and goals as of 19 February 2025

Jefesson Vieira Eufrazio (born 25 May 1994), commonly known as Jefinho is a Brazilian professional footballer who plays as a striker for Brazilian club Votuporanguense.

== Club career ==
=== Nejmeh SC ===
Born in Triunfo Potiguar, Brazil, he joined several local Brazilian clubs, and finally decided to go abroad for the first time to Lebanon and joined Lebanese Premier League side Nejmeh in the 2022–23 season. He made his league debut on 8 January 2023 in a match against Al Ahed. On 14 January 2023, Jefinho scored his first league goal for Nejmeh in a 0–1 win against Chabab Ghazieh. He contributed with 10 league appearances, scored five goals and one assist during his 2023–23 season.

=== Persik Kediri ===
On 11 July 2023, Jefinho went abroad to Southeast Asia and signed a contract with Liga 1 club Persik Kediri.
