= Microregion of Mossoró =

Coordinates: 5°11′16″S 37°20′38″W

Mossoró
- Microregion
- Country: Brazil
- State: Rio Grande do Norte
- Mesoregion: Oeste Potiguar

Mossoró was a microregion in the Brazilian state of Rio Grande do Norte.

== Municipalities ==
The microregion consisted of the following municipalities:

- Areia Branca
- Baraúna
- Grossos
- Mossoró
- Serra do Mel
- Tibau
