= Serra do Coqueiro =

Mountain range in Rio Grande do Norte, Brazil

Coordinates: 06°17′38″S 38°24′35″W

Serra do Coqueiro is a mountain range in the border of Brazilian states of Rio Grande do Norte, Ceará and Paraíba. An unnamed peak at Venha-Ver is the highest point in Rio Grande do Norte, reaching 868 metres (2,848 ft).
