= Belém do Brejo do Cruz =

Belem do Brejo do Cruz
- Municipality
- Municipality of Belem do Brejo do Cruz
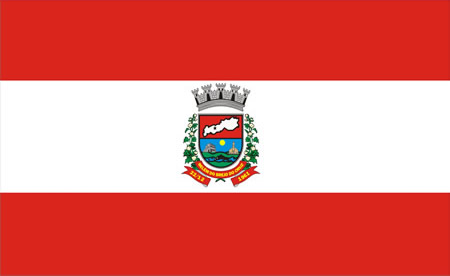
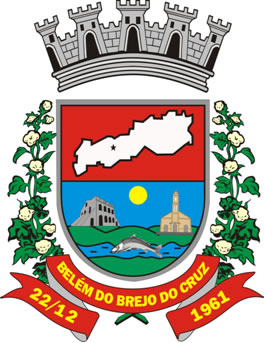
- Flag Coat of arms

- Location of Belém do Brejo do Cruz in the State of Paraíba
- Coordinates: 06°11′20″S 37°32′09″W
- Country: Brazil
- Region: Northeast
- State: Paraíba
- Founded: December 22, 1961

Government
  - Mayor: Suzana Maria Rabelo Pereira Forte

Area
  - Total: 601.549 km^{2} (232.259 sq mi)

Population (2020)
  - Total: 7,349
  - Density: 11.8/km^{2} (31/sq mi)
- Time zone: UTC−3 (BRT)
- HDI (2000): 0.570 – medium

Belém do Brejo do Cruz is the northernmost municipality in the Brazilian state of Paraíba.
