= Açu National Forest =

National forest in the state of Rio Grande do Norte, Brazil

- Floresta Nacional de Açu
- IUCN category VI (protected area with sustainable use of natural resources)
- Location within Brazil
- Nearest city: Assu, Rio Grande do Norte
- Coordinates: 5.579°S 36.945°W
- Area: 218.46 hectares (539.8 acres)
- Designation: National forest
- Created: 10 August 1950

The Açu National Forest (Portuguese: Floresta Nacional de Açu) is a national forest in the state of Rio Grande do Norte, Brazil.

== Location ==
The Açu National Forest is in the municipality of Assu (or Açu) in the state of Rio Grande do Norte. It has an area of 218.46 hectares (539.8 acres). The terrain is flat or slightly undulating. The only body of water is Lago do Piató, which has a maximum depth of 10 metres (33 ft). It used to be fed by flood water from the Piranhas River, but since the construction of a dam on the Piranhas no longer receives water from the river.

== History ==
The Açu Forest Park (Horto Florestal de Açu) was created by law 1.175 on 10 August 1950. It was made a national forest by ordinance 245 of 18 July 2001. It is the first national forest in Rio Grande do Norte and the third in the north east region. It was created due to a popular movement by the Defence Committee of the National Forest. The Açu National Forest is administered by the Chico Mendes Institute for Biodiversity Conservation (ICMBio). It is classed as IUCN protected area category VI (protected area with sustainable use of natural resources) with the objective of sustainable multiple use of forest resources and scientific research, with emphasis on methods for sustainable exploitation of native forests. An advisory council was appointed on 28 August 2008.

== Environment ==
The forest is mostly covered by typical Caatinga shrub and trees, with many cactuses. There are small populations of carnauba. 62 species from 46 genera have been identified, mostly from the families Fabaceae, Euphorbiaceae, Cactaceae and Boraginaceae. Typical species are Croton sonderianus, Caesalpinia pyramidalis, Auxemma glazioviana, Dipteryx odorata and Tabebuia impetiginosa. The forest, with its rich vegetation, is home to various species of birds, reptiles and mammals such as armadillos, cavy, pampas deer and marmoset.

== Sources ==
- FLONA Açu (in Portuguese), ISA: Instituto Socioambiental
- Flona de Açu (in Portuguese), Chico Mendes Institute for Biodiversity Conservation
- Floresta Nacional de Açu terá plano de manejo (in Portuguese), MMA: Ministério do Meio Ambiente, 17 June 2003
- Unidade de Conservação: Floresta Nacional de Açu (in Portuguese), MMA: Ministério do Meio Ambiente
