= Oeste Potiguar =

Coordinates: 5°39′50″S 37°47′56″W

- Mesoregion
- Country: Brazil
- State: Rio Grande do Norte

Oeste Potiguar was a mesoregion in the Brazilian state of Rio Grande do Norte.

== Microregions ==
- Chapada do Apodi
- Médio Oeste
- Mossoró
- Pau dos Ferros
- Serra de São Miguel
- Umarizal
- Vale do Açu
