= Água Nova =

Municipality in Rio Grande do Norte, Brazil

Coordinates: 6.20889°S 38.2969°W

- Municipality
- Municipality of Água Nova
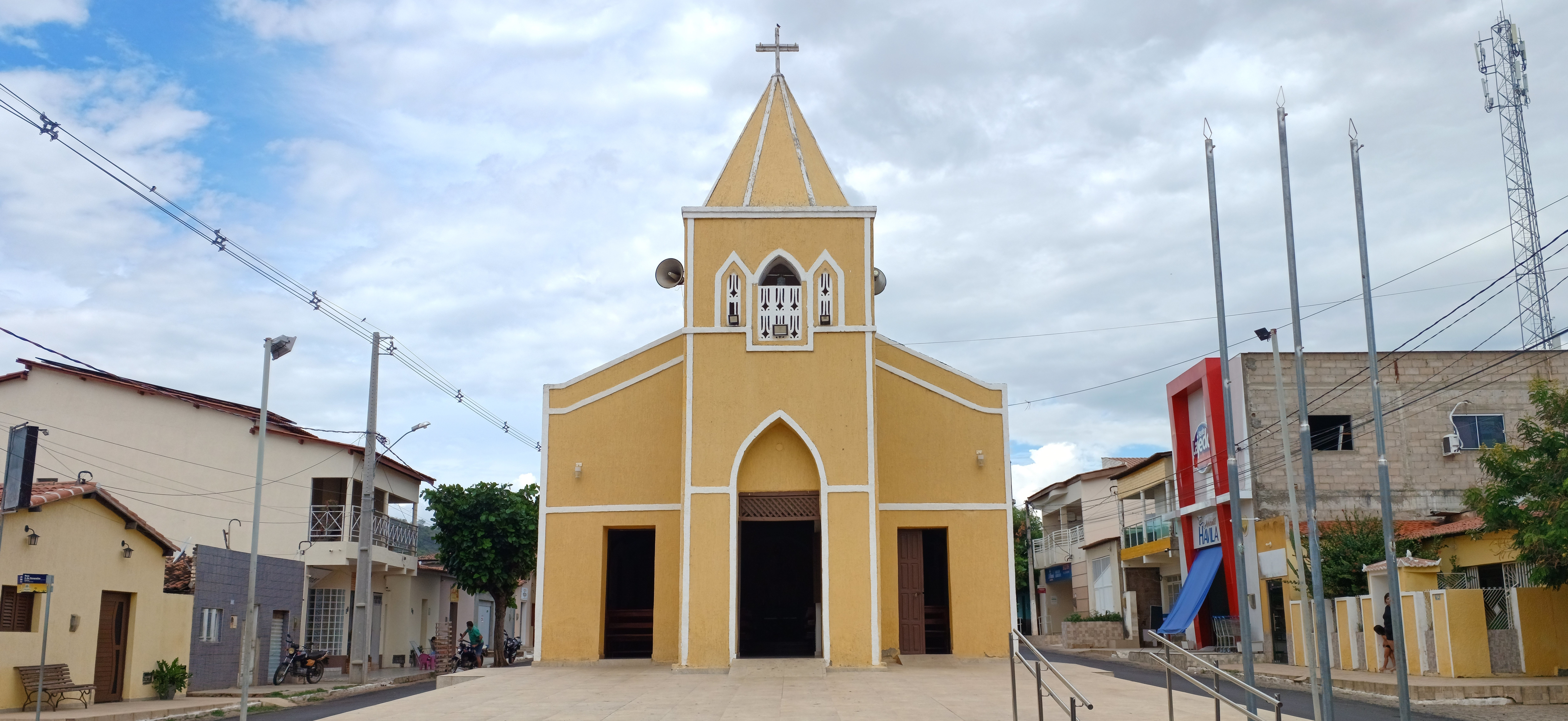

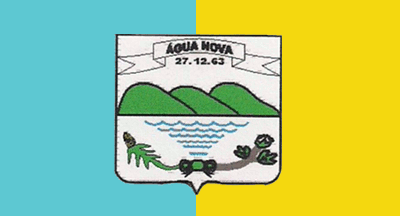
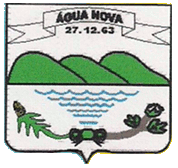
- Flag Coat of arms

- Location in Rio Grande do Norte
- Country: Brazil
- Region: Nordeste
- State: Rio Grande do Norte
- Mesoregion: Oeste Potiguar

Population (2022)
  - Total: 2,946
- Time zone: UTC -3

Água Nova is a municipality in the state of Rio Grande do Norte in the Northeast region of Brazil. With an area of 50.684 square kilometers (19.569 sq mi), of which 0.7441 square kilometres (0.2873 sq mi) is urban, it is located 344 km from Natal, the state capital, and 1,496 km from Brasília, the federal capital. Its population in the 2022 demographic census was 2,946 inhabitants, according to the Brazilian Institute of Geography and Statistics (IBGE), ranking as the 151st most populous municipality in the state of Rio Grande do Norte.

== Geography ==
The territory of Água Nova covers 50.684 square kilometers (19.569 sq mi), of which 0.7441 square kilometres (0.2873 sq mi) constitutes the urban area. It sits at an average altitude of 277 meters above sea level. The city is located 344 km from the state capital Natal, and 1,496 km from the federal capital Brasília.

Under the territorial division established in 2017 by the Brazilian Institute of Geography and Statistics (IBGE), the municipality belongs to the immediate geographical region of Pau dos Ferros, within the intermediate region of Mossoró. Previously, under the microregion and mesoregion divisions, it was part of the microregion of Serra de São Miguel in the mesoregion of Oeste Potiguar.

== Demographics ==
In the 2022 census, the municipality had a population of 2,946 inhabitants and ranked only 151st in the state that year (out of 167 municipalities), with 51.05% female and 48.95% male, resulting in a sex ratio of 95.88 (9,588 men for every 10,000 women), compared to 2,980 inhabitants in the 2010 census (64.03% living in the urban area), when it held the 150th state position. Between the 2010 and 2022 censuses, the population of Água Nova changed at an annual geometric growth rate of -0.1%. Regarding age group in the 2022 census, 68.01% of the inhabitants were between 15 and 64 years old, 20.16% were under fifteen, and 11.85% were 65 or older. The population density in 2022 was 58.12 inhabitants per square kilometer, with an average of 2.97 inhabitants per household.

The municipality's Human Development Index (HDI-M) is considered medium, according to data from the United Nations Development Programme. According to the 2010 report published in 2013, its value was 0.616, ranking 64th in the state and 3,771th nationally (out of 5,565 municipalities), and the Gini coefficient rose from 0.39 in 2003 to 0.46 in 2010. Considering only the longevity index, its value is 0.776, the education index is 0.572, and the income index is 0.527.

== See also ==
- List of municipalities in Rio Grande do Norte
