= Afonso Bezerra =

Municipality in Rio Grande do Norte, Brazil

- Municipality
- Municipality of Afonso Bezerra
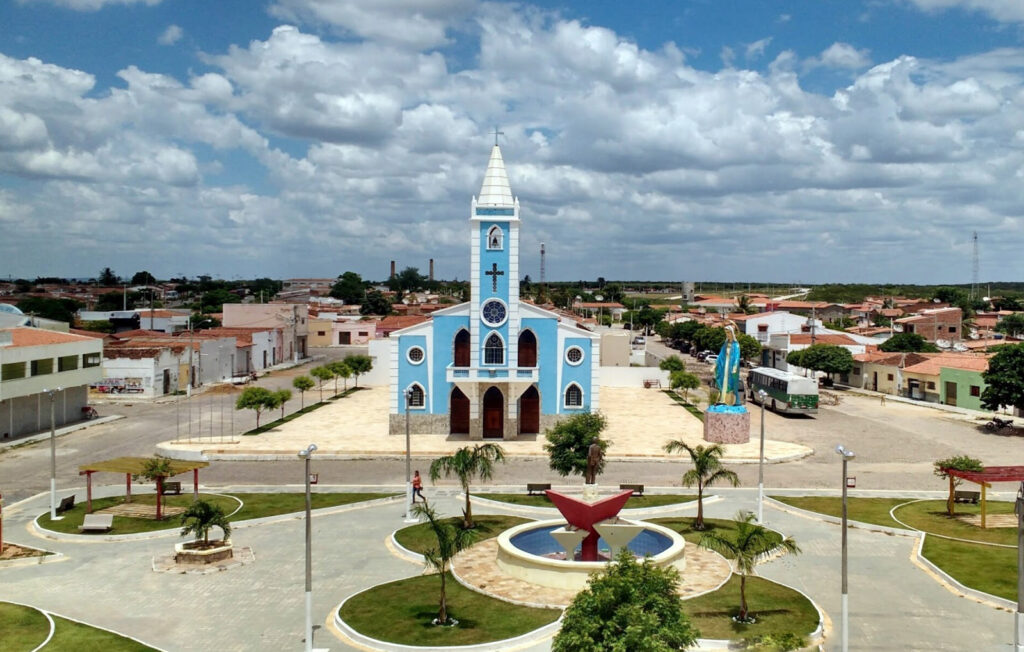

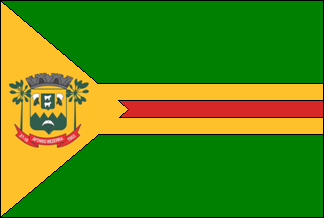
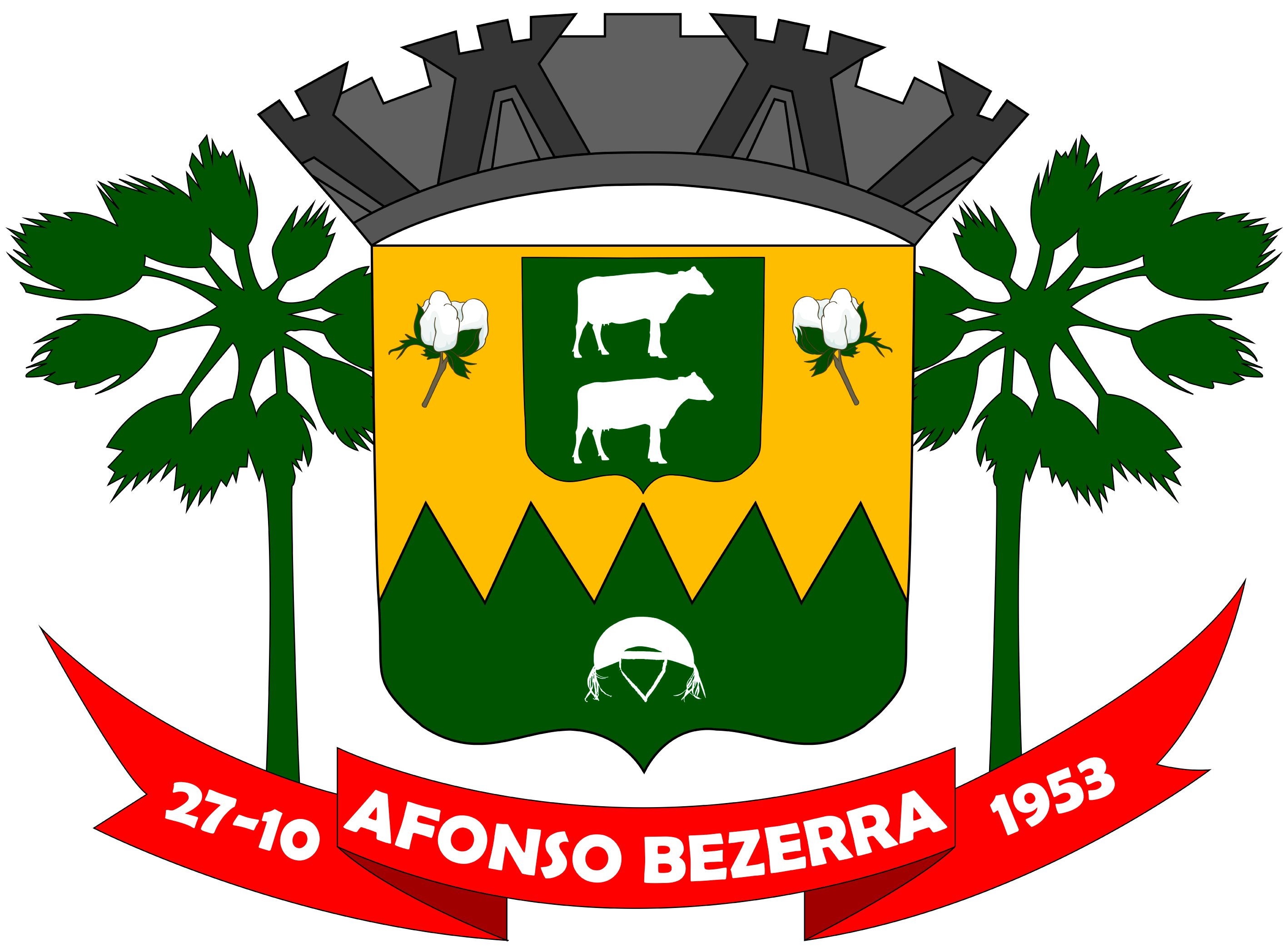
- Flag Coat of arms

- Location in Rio Grande do Norte
- Coordinates: 5°30′S 36°31′W
- Country: Brazil
- Region: Nordeste
- State: Rio Grande do Norte
- Mesoregion: Central Potiguar

Population (2020)
  - Total: 11,029
- Time zone: UTC -3

Afonso Bezerra is a municipality in the state of Rio Grande do Norte in the Northeast region of Brazil. With an area of 576.179 square kilometers (222.464 sq mi), of which 3.3515 square kilometres (1.2940 sq mi) is urban, it is located 147 km from Natal, the state capital, and 1,692 km from Brasília, the federal capital. Its population in the 2022 demographic census was 10,839 inhabitants, according to the Brazilian Institute of Geography and Statistics (IBGE), ranking as the 57th most populous municipality in the state of Rio Grande do Norte.

== Geography ==
The territory of Afonso Bezerra covers 576.179 square kilometers (222.464 sq mi), of which 3.3515 square kilometres (1.2940 sq mi) constitutes the urban area. It sits at an average altitude of 62 meters above sea level. The city is located 147 km from the state capital Natal, and 1,692 km from the federal capital Brasília.

Under the territorial division established in 2017 by the Brazilian Institute of Geography and Statistics (IBGE), the municipality belongs to the immediate geographical region of Açu, within the intermediate region of Mossoró. Previously, under the microregion and mesoregion divisions, it was part of the microregion of Angicos in the mesoregion of Central Potiguar.

== Demographics ==
In the 2022 census, the municipality had a population of 10,839 inhabitants and ranked only 57th in the state that year (out of 184 municipalities), with 50.34% male and 49.66% female, resulting in a sex ratio of 101,36 (10,136 men for every 10,000 women), compared to 11,035 inhabitants in the 2010 census (53.11% living in the urban area), when it held the 57th state position. Between the 2010 and 2022 censuses, the population of Afonso Bezerra changed at an annual geometric growth rate of 0%. Regarding age group in the 2022 census, 68.72% of the inhabitants were between 15 and 64 years old, 20.7% were under fifteen, and 10.59% were 65 or older. The population density in 2022 was 18.81 inhabitants per square kilometer, with an average of 3.21 inhabitants per household.

The municipality's Human Development Index (HDI-M) is considered medium, according to data from the United Nations Development Programme. According to the 2010 report published in 2013, its value was 0.585, ranking 130th in the state and 4,515th nationally (out of 5,565 municipalities), and the Gini coefficient rose from 0.39 in 2003 to 0.52 in 2010. Considering only the longevity index, its value is 0.713, the income index is 0.560, and the education index is 0.502.

== See also ==
- List of municipalities in Rio Grande do Norte
