= Vila João Pessoa =

Coordinates: 30°04′06″S 51°10′33″W

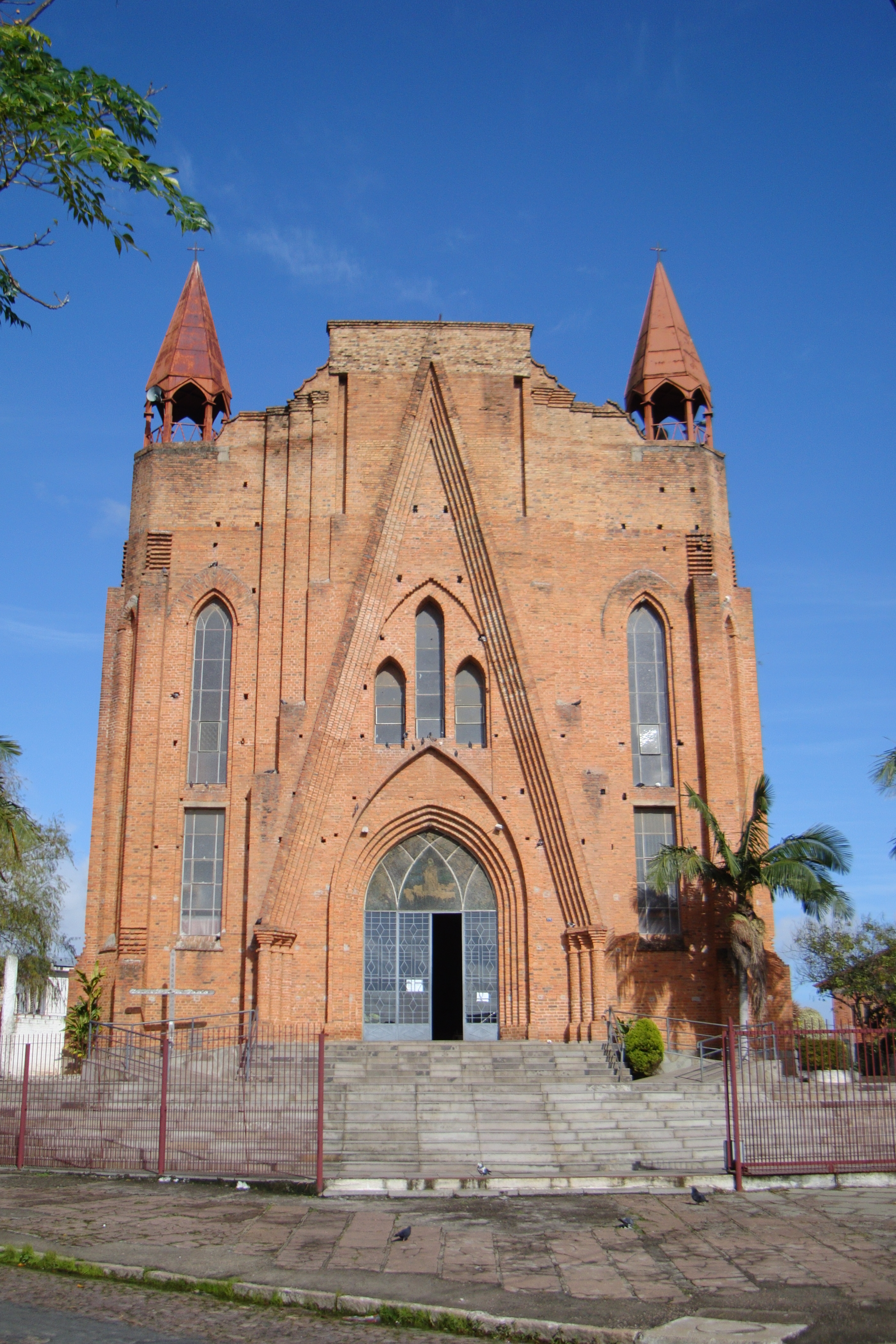
Igreja São Judas Tadeu in Vila João Pessoa.

Vila João Pessoa is a neighbourhood (bairro) in the city of Porto Alegre, the state capital of Rio Grande do Sul, in Brazil. It was created by Law 2022 from December 7, 1959. In 2019, the neighborhood had 13,041 inhabitants, spread across its 112.2 hectares, with a population density of 11,622.99 inhabitants per square kilometer. The illiteracy rate in the neighborhood was 3.18%, slightly lower than the general rate for Porto Alegre, which was 3.86%. The average household income was 2.88 minimum wages. Its Municipal Human Development Index (MHDI) was 0.770, lower compared to the city's index of 0.805.
