= Encanto, Rio Grande do Norte =

Municipality in Rio Grande do Norte, Brazil

Encanto
- Municipality
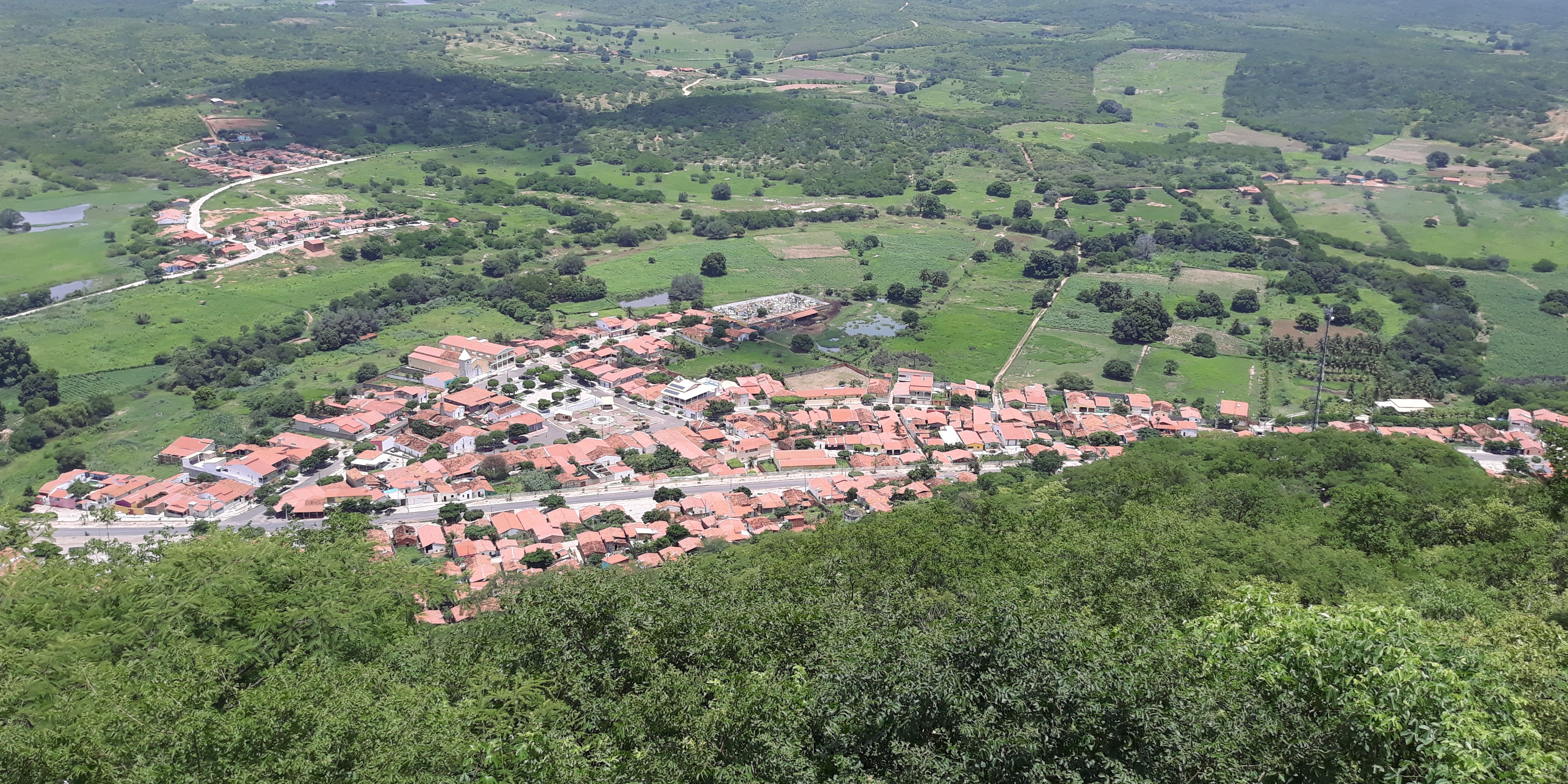

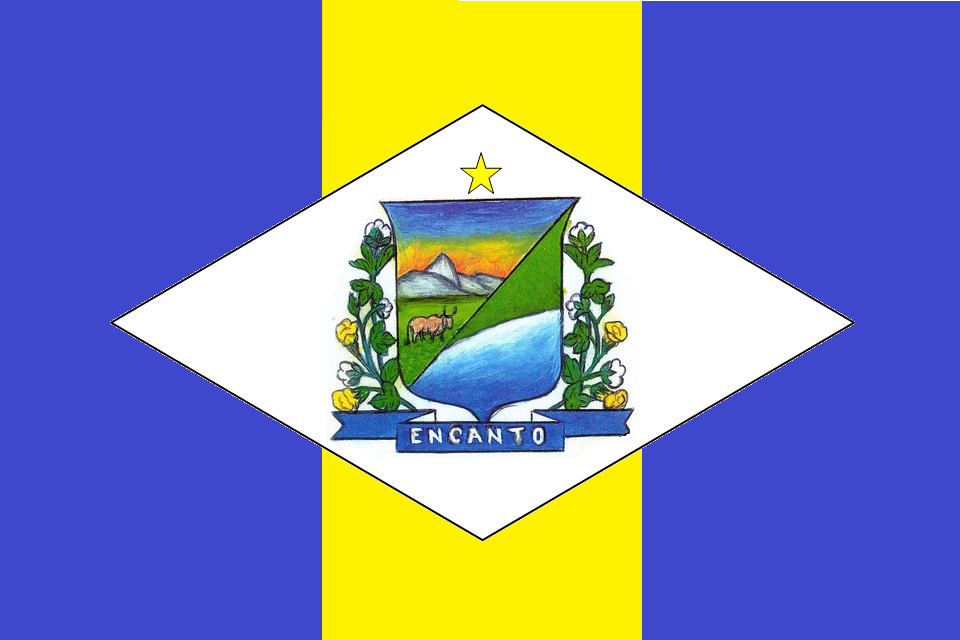
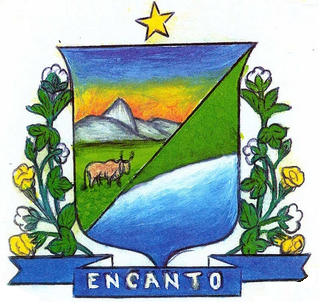
- Flag Coat of arms

- Location in Rio Grande do Norte state

- Location in Brazil
- Coordinates: 6°6′40″S 38°18′22″W
- Country: Brazil
- Region: Northeast
- State: Rio Grande do Norte

Area
  - Total: 126 km^{2} (49 sq mi)

Population (2020)
  - Total: 5,668
  - Density: 45.0/km^{2} (117/sq mi)
- Time zone: UTC-03:00 (BRT)

Encanto (lit. "charm") is a municipality located in Rio Grande do Norte, Brazil, located within the microregion of Serra de São Miguel and mesoregion of Oeste Potiguar. According to IBGE, the estimated population in 2020 was 5,668 inhabitants. The territorial area is 126 km^{2} (49 sq mi) and was created in 1963.

== See also ==
- List of cities in Brazil
- List of municipalities in Rio Grande do Norte
