= Luís Gomes =

Municipality in Rio Grande do Norte, Brazil

Coordinates: 6°25′S 38°23′W

- Municipality
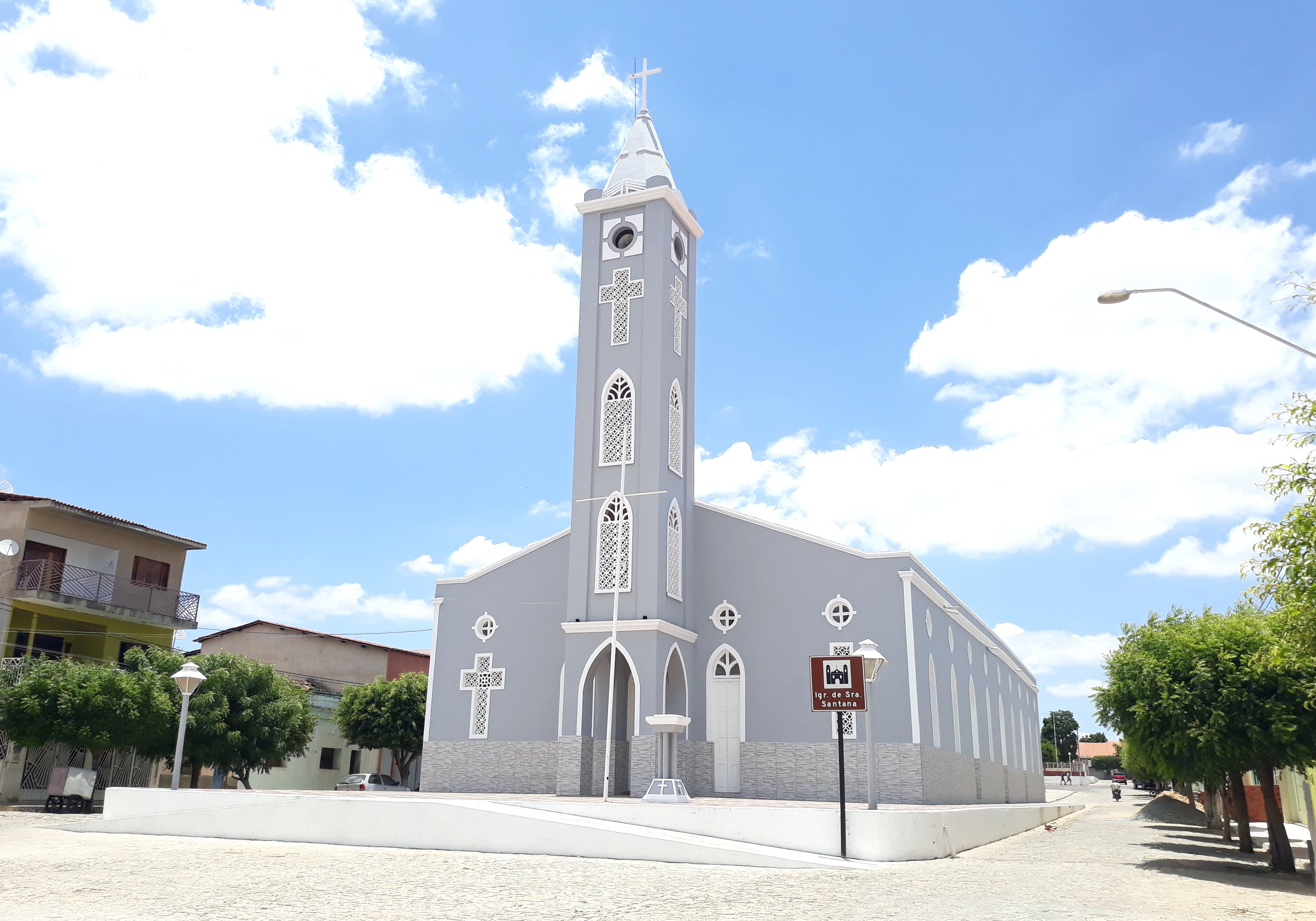

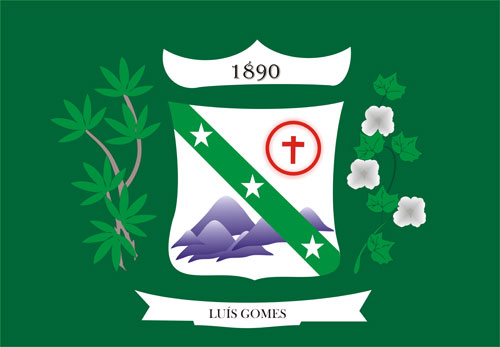
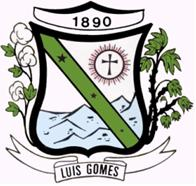
- Flag Coat of arms
- Interactive map of Luís Gomes
- Country: Brazil
- Region: Nordeste
- State: Rio Grande do Norte
- Mesoregion: Oeste Potiguar

Population (2020)
  - Total: 10,146
- Time zone: UTC−3 (BRT)

Luís Gomes is a municipality in the state of Rio Grande do Norte in the Northeast region of Brazil.

== See also ==
- List of municipalities in Rio Grande do Norte
