= São Miguel, Rio Grande do Norte =

Municipality in Rio Grande do Norte, Brazil

Coordinates: 6°12′43″S 38°29′49″W

São Miguel
- Municipality
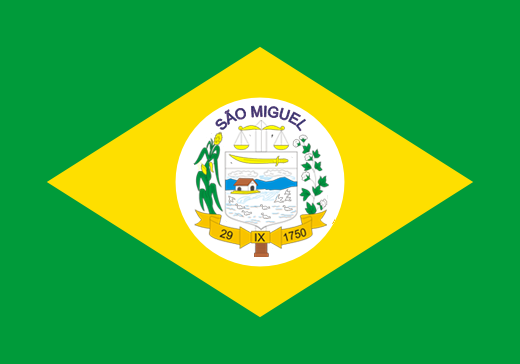
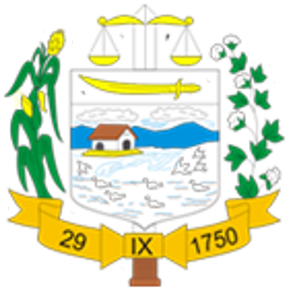
- Flag Coat of arms

- Location in the Rio Grande do Norte
- Country: Brazil
- Region: Nordeste
- State: Rio Grande do Norte
- Mesoregion: Oeste Potiguar

Population (2020)
  - Total: 23,655
- Time zone: UTC−3 (BRT)

São Miguel is a municipality in the state of Rio Grande do Norte in the Northeast region of Brazil.

== See also ==
- List of municipalities in Rio Grande do Norte
