= Venha-Ver =

Municipality in Rio Grande do Norte, Brazil

- Municipality
- The Municipality of Venha-Ver
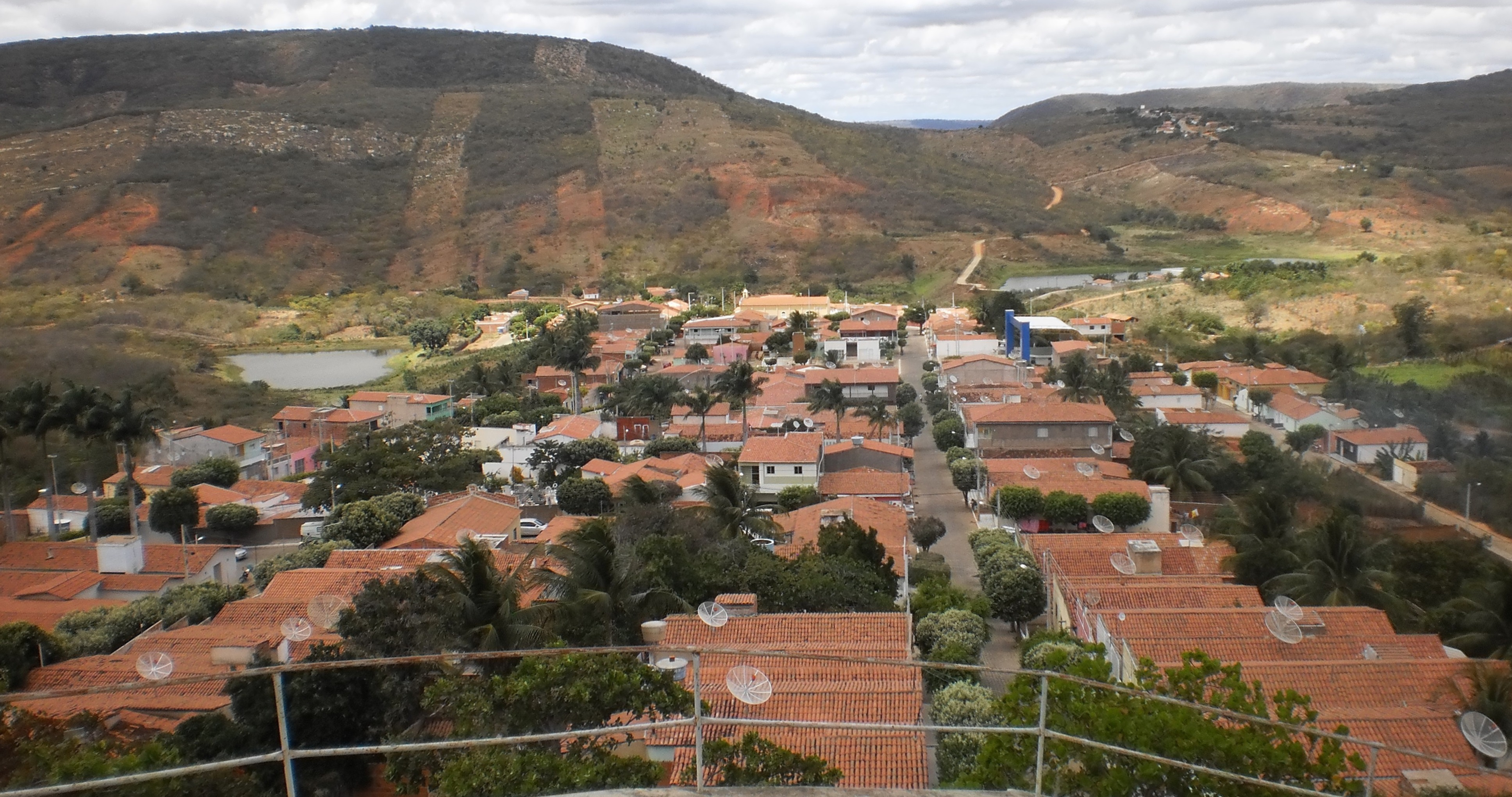

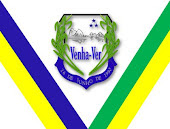
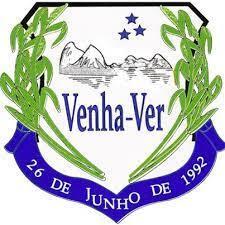
- Flag Coat of arms

- Location of Venha-Ver
- Coordinates: 06°19′33″S 38°29′02″W
- Country: Brazil
- Region: Northeast
- State: Rio Grande do Norte
- Founded: June 26, 1992

Government
  - Mayor: Expedito Salviano (PR)

Area
  - Total: 71.622 km^{2} (27.653 sq mi)

Population (2020)
  - Total: 4,205
  - Density: 53.2/km^{2} (138/sq mi)
- Time zone: UTC−3 (BRT)
- HDI (2000): 0.544 – medium

Venha-Ver (lit. "come see") is the westernmost city in the Brazilian state of Rio Grande do Norte. The city's name means "Come-to-see-it" in Portuguese. The highest point of the state is located there, in the Serra do Coqueiro mountain range, at the triple border of Rio Grande do Norte, Paraíba and Ceará.
