= São Rafael, Rio Grande do Norte =

Municipality in Rio Grande do Norte, Brazil

Coordinates: 5°47′56″S 36°55′15″W

São Rafael
- Municipality
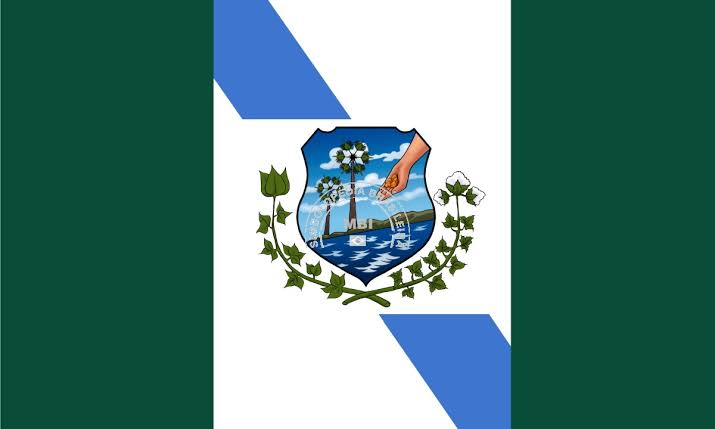
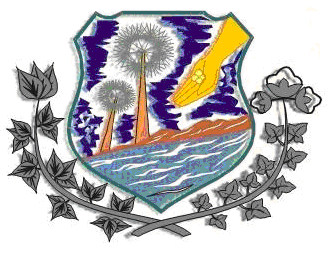
- Flag Coat of arms
- Interactive map of São Rafael
- Country: Brazil
- Region: Nordeste
- State: Rio Grande do Norte
- Mesoregion: Oeste Potiguar

Population (2020)
  - Total: 8,192
- Time zone: UTC−3 (BRT)

São Rafael (Brazilian Portuguese pronunciation: [ˈsɐ̃w̃ ʁafaˈɛw]) is a municipality in the state of Rio Grande do Norte in the Northeast region of Brazil.

== See also ==
- List of municipalities in Rio Grande do Norte
