= Riacho de Santana, Rio Grande do Norte =

Municipality in Rio Grande do Norte, Brazil

Coordinates: 6°15′46″S 38°18′57″W

- Municipality
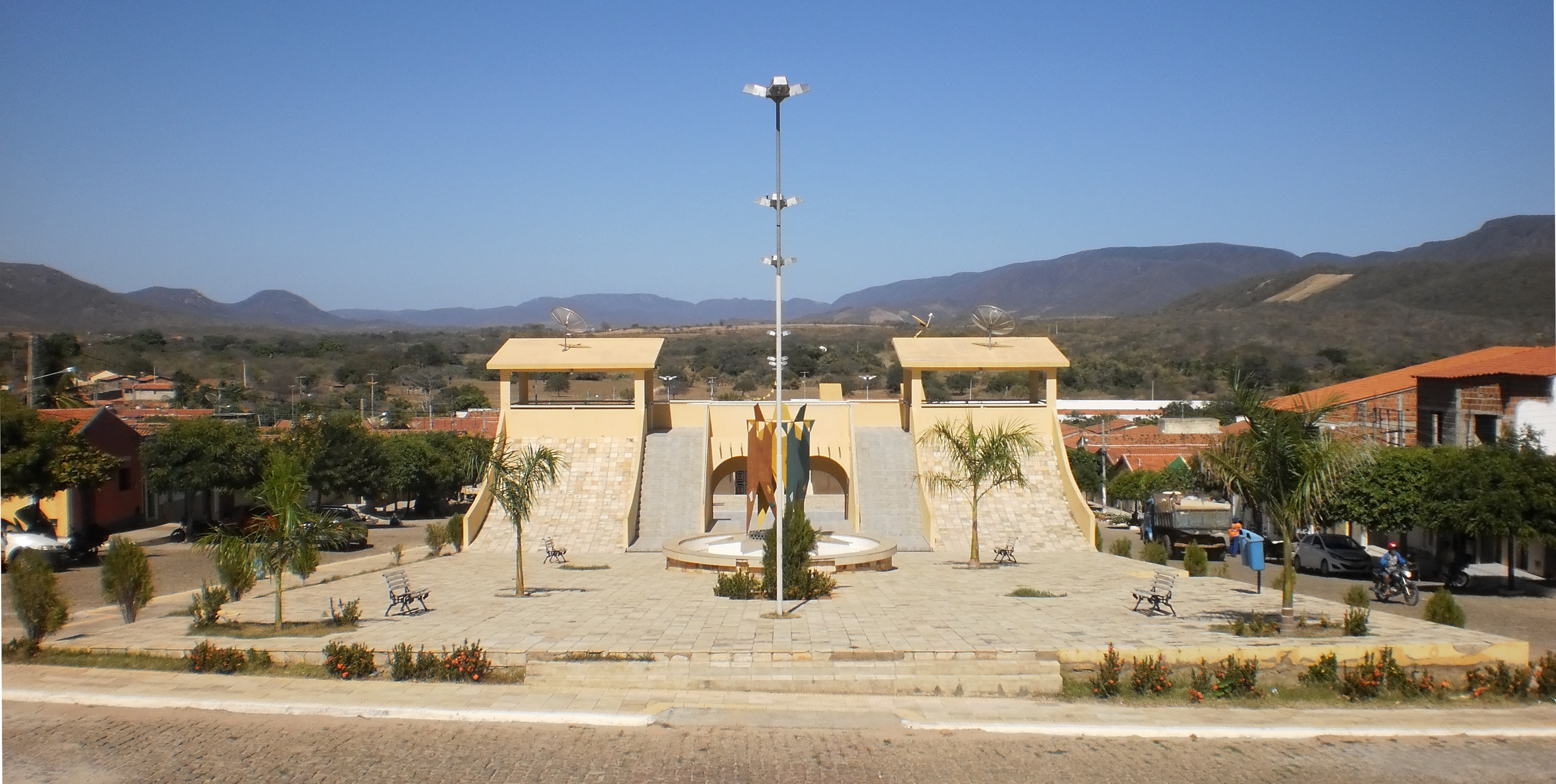

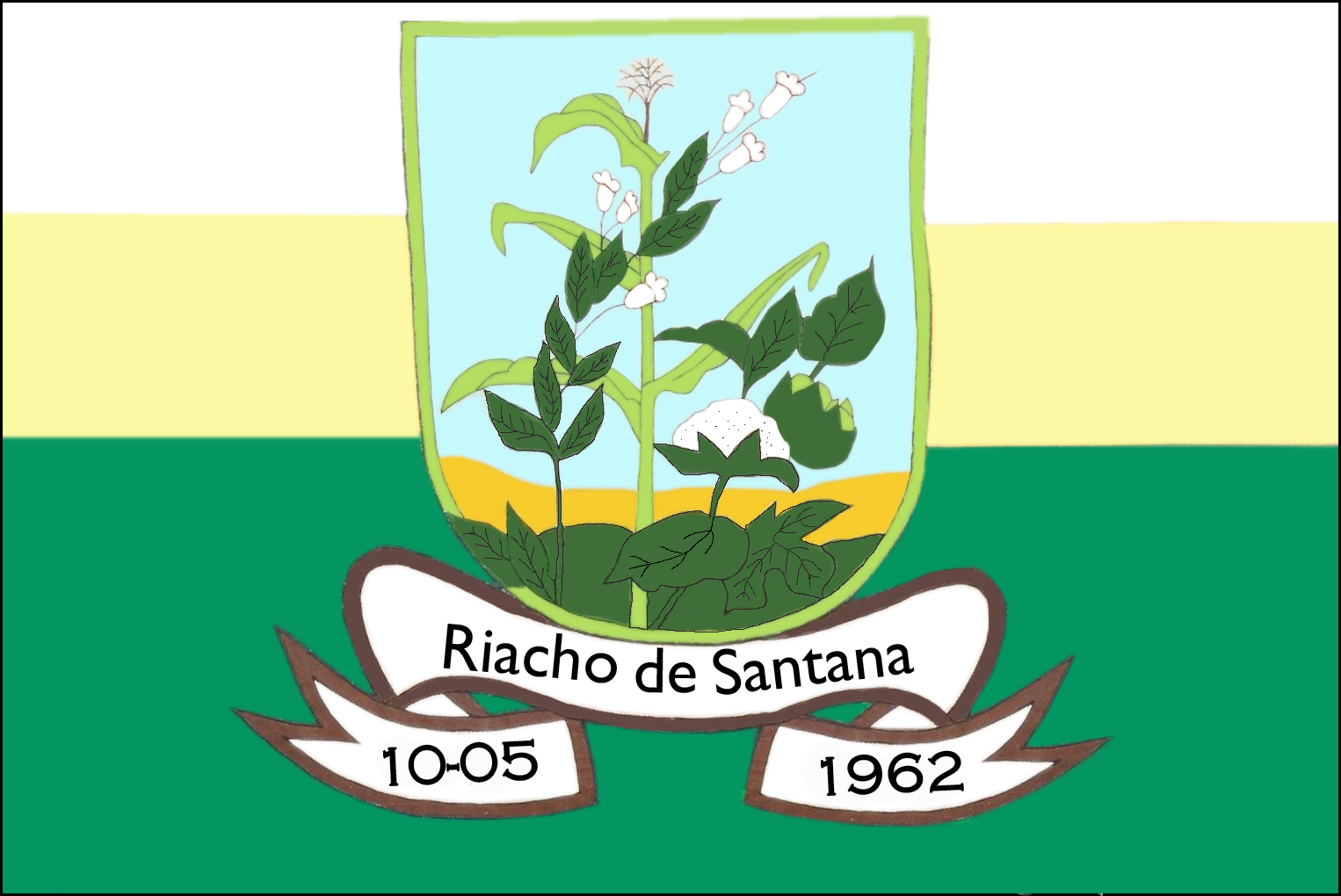
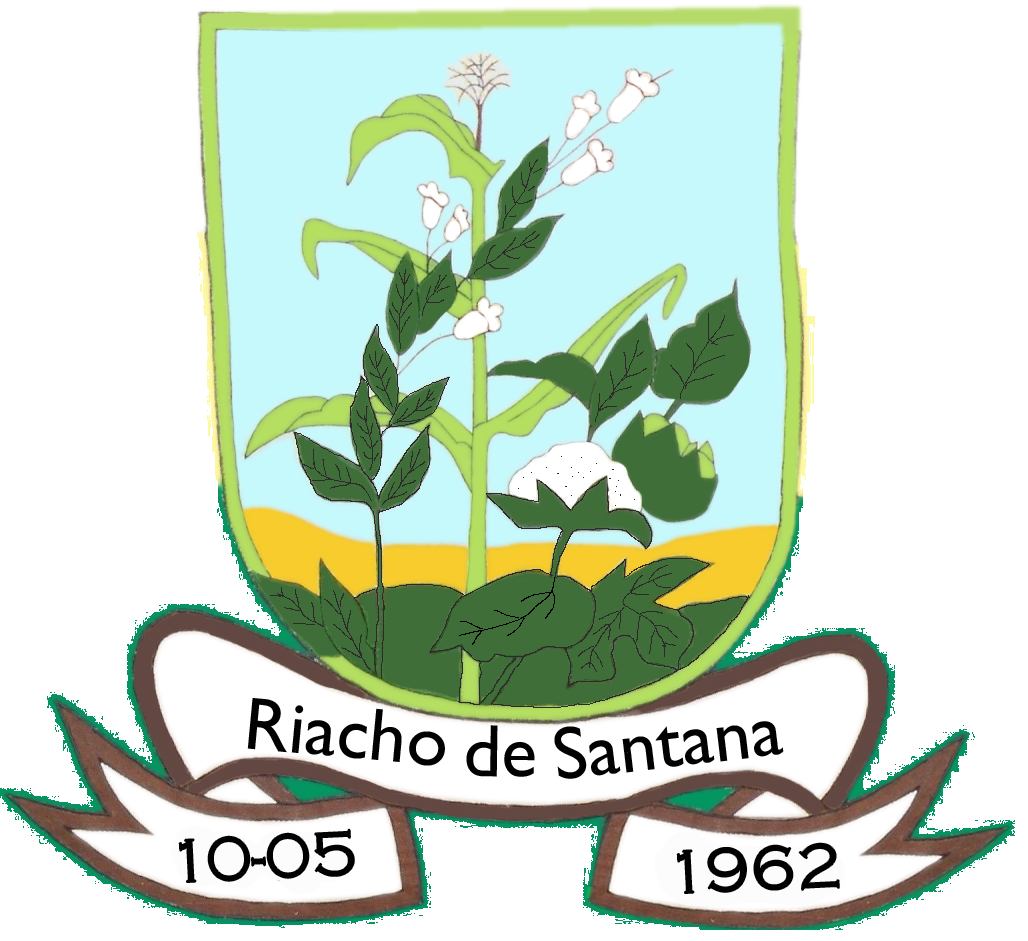
- Flag Coat of arms
- Interactive map of Riacho de Santana, Rio Grande do Norte
- Country: Brazil
- Region: Nordeste
- State: Rio Grande do Norte
- Mesoregion: Oeste Potiguar

Population (2020)
  - Total: 4,199
- Time zone: UTC−3 (BRT)

Riacho de Santana is a municipality in the state of Rio Grande do Norte in the Northeast region of Brazil.

== See also ==
- List of municipalities in Rio Grande do Norte
