= Serra do Mel =

Municipality in Rio Grande do Norte, Brazil

Coordinates: 5.17°S 37.0289°W

- Municipality
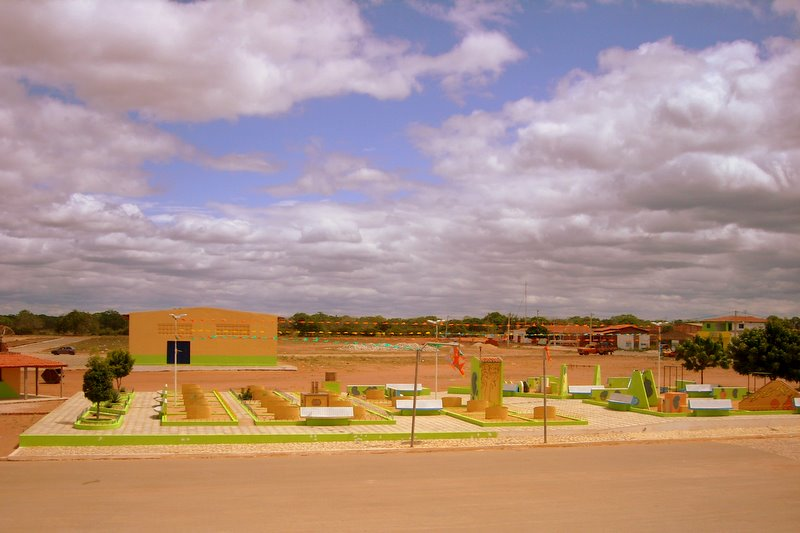

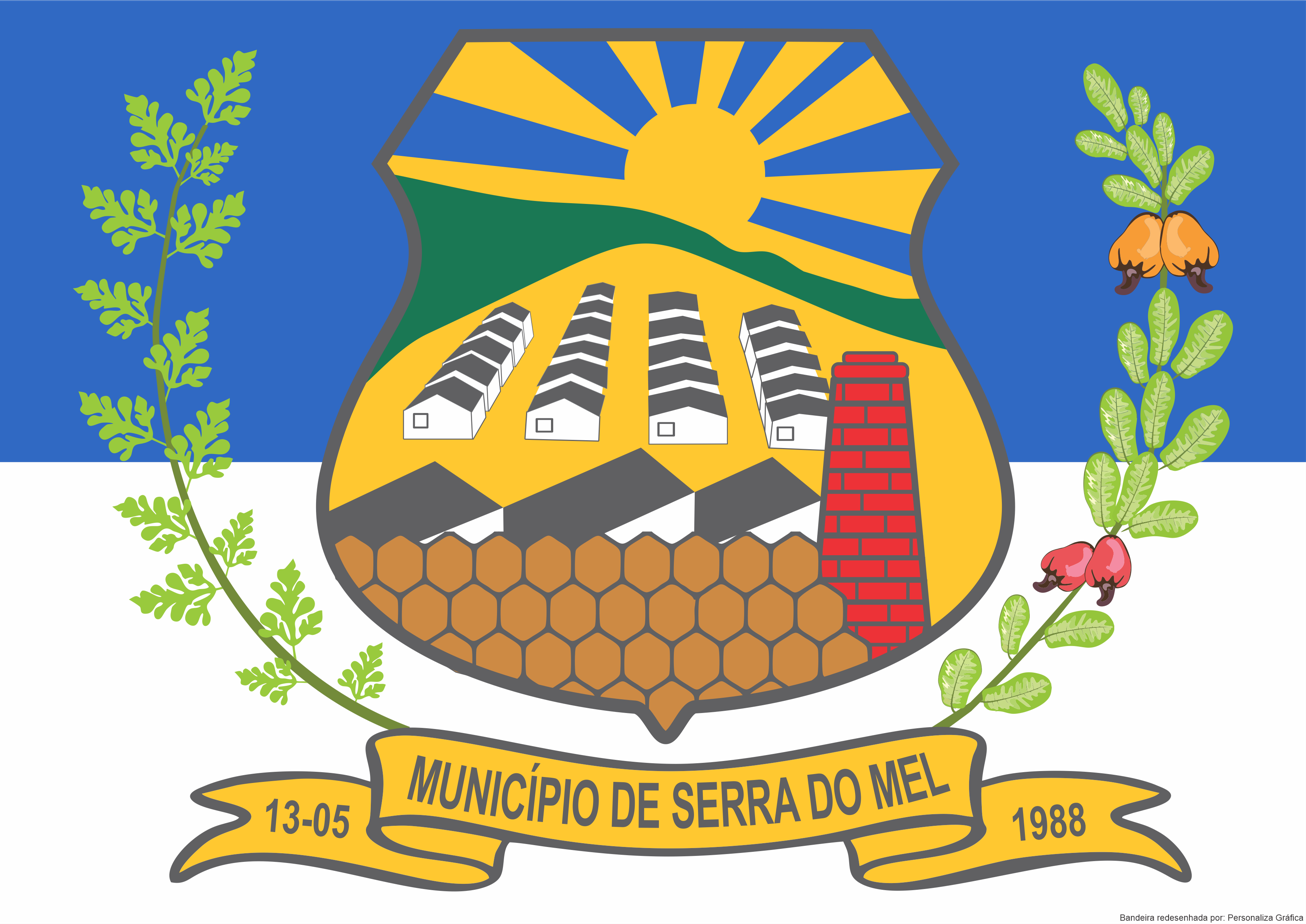
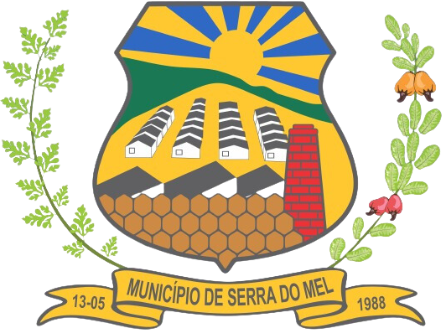
- Flag Coat of arms
- Interactive map of Serra do Mel
- Country: Brazil
- Region: Nordeste
- State: Rio Grande do Norte
- Mesoregion: Oeste Potiguar

Population (2020)
  - Total: 12,083
- Time zone: UTC−3 (BRT)

Serra do Mel is a municipality in the state of Rio Grande do Norte in the Northeast region of Brazil.

== See also ==
- List of municipalities in Rio Grande do Norte
