= 2010 Brazilian census =

Twelfth census of Brazil
- August 1, 2010

General information
- Country: Brazil

Results
- Total population: 190,755,799 (▲12.5%)
- Most populous state: São Paulo (41,262,199)
- Least populous state: Roraima (450,479)

The Brazilian 2010 Census was the 12th census of Brazil, organized by the Brazilian Institute of Geography and Statistics (IBGE), with the reference date being August 1, 2010. The population was found to be a record 190,755,799, an increase of 12.5%. The population aged, with the median age now being 29, compared to 25 in 2000.

The following census took place on August 1, 2022, after two postponements, one due to the COVID-19 pandemic and the other caused by budgetary constraints.

== Federal units' and regions' population ==
=== Federal Units ===
Population and population change in Brazil by federal unit
Rank	Federal Unit	Population as of 2000 census	Population as of 2010 census	Change	Percent change	Percent of Brazil
1	São Paulo	36,969,476	41,262,199	4,292,723▲	11.6%▲	21.6%▼
2	Minas Gerais	17,866,402	19,597,330	1,730,928▲	9.7%▲	10.3%▼
3	Rio de Janeiro	14,367,083	15,989,929	1,622,846▲	11.3%▲	8.4%▼
4	Bahia	13,066,910	14,016,906	949,996▲	7.3%▲	7.4%▼
5	Rio Grande do Sul	10,181,749	10,693,929	512,180▲	5.0%▲	5.6%▼
6	Paraná	9,558,454	10,444,526	886,072▲	9.3%▲	5.5%▼
7	Pernambuco	7,911,937	8,796,448	884,511▲	11.2%▲	4.6%▼
8	Ceará	7,418,476	9,883,640	1,033,905▲	13.9%▲	4.4%
9	Pará	6,189,550	7,581,051	1,391,501▲	22.5%▲	4.0%▲
10	Maranhão	5,642,960	6,574,789	931,829▲	16.5%▲	3.5%▲
11	Santa Catarina	5,349,580	6,248,436	898,856▲	16.8%▲	3.3%▲
12	Goiás	4,996,439	6,003,788	1,007,349▲	20.1%▲	3.2%▲
13	Paraíba	3,439,344	3,766,528	327,184▲	9.5%▲	2.0%
14	Espírito Santo	3,094,390	3,514,952	420,562▲	13.6%▲	1.8%
15	Amazonas	2,813,085	3,483,985	670,900▲	23.8%▲	1.8%▲
16	Rio Grande do Norte	2,771,538	3,168,027	396,489▲	14.3%▲	1.7%▲
17	Alagoas	2,819,172	3,120,494	301,322 ▲	10.7%▲	1.6%▼
18	Piauí	2,841,202	3,118,360	277,158▲	9.7%▲	1.6%▼
19	Mato Grosso	2,502,260	3,035,122	532,862▲	21.3%▲	1.6%▲
20	Distrito Federal	2,043,169	2,570,160	526,991▲	25.8%▲	1.4%▲
21	Mato Grosso do Sul	2,074,877	2,449,024	374,147▲	18.0%▲	1.3%▲
22	Sergipe	1,781,714	2,068,017	286,303▲	16.0%▲	1.1%
23	Rondônia	1,377,792	1,562,409	184,617▲	13.4%▲	0.8%
24	Tocantins	1,155,913	1,383,445	227,532▲	19.7%▲	0.7%
25	Acre	557,226	733,559	176,333▲	31.7%▲	0.4%▲
26	Amapá	475,843	669,526	193,683▲	40.7%▲	0.4%▲
27	Roraima	324,152	450,479	126,327▲	39.0%▲	0.2%
	Brazil	169,590,693	190,755,799	27,323,632▲	12.5%▲	100%

=== Regions ===
Rank	Region	Population (2000)	Population (2010)	Population change	Percent Change	Percent of Brazil
1	Southeast	72,297,351	80,364,410	8,067,059	11.2%▲	42.1%▼
2	Northeast	47,693,253	53,081,950	5,388,697	11.3%▲	27.8%▼
3	South	25,089,783	27,386,891	2,297,108	9.1%▲	14.4%▼
4	North	12,893,561	15,864,454	2,970,893	23.0%▲	8.3%▲
5	Central-West	11,616,745	14,058,094	2,441,349	21.0%▲	7.4%▲

== Race and religion ==
The census found that the composition of Brazil was as follows: 47.5% were White, 43.4% were Pardo (Mixed-Race), 7.5% were Black, 1.1% were East Asian (Yellow in the census), 0.4% were Indigenous and 0.01% did not answer.

The census also asked people their religion: 64.6% were Catholics, 22.2% were Protestants or Evangelicals, 8% had no religion, 2% followed Spiritism and 3.2% followed other religions.

== See also ==
- Demographics of Brazil
