= Barauna =

Baraúna may refer to:

- Baraúna, Paraíba, Brazil
- Baraúna, Rio Grande do Norte, Brazil
- Barauna Kalan, a town in Auraiya district in the Indian state of Uttar Pradesh
- a Brazilian name for the quebracho wood
