= Apodi, Rio Grande do Norte =

Municipality in Rio Grande do Norte, Brazil

Coordinates: 5°39′50″S 37°47′56″W

Apodi
- Municipality
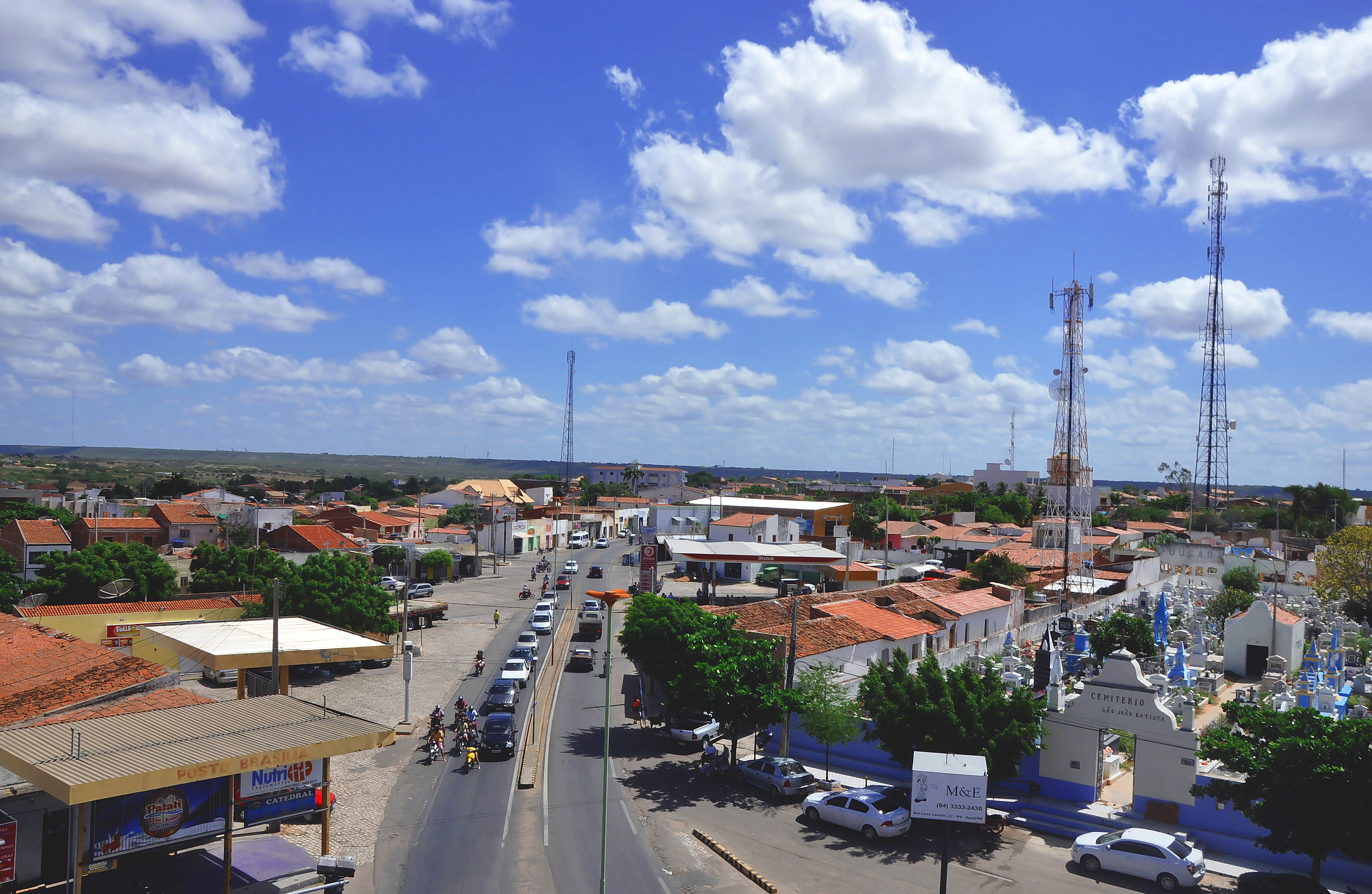

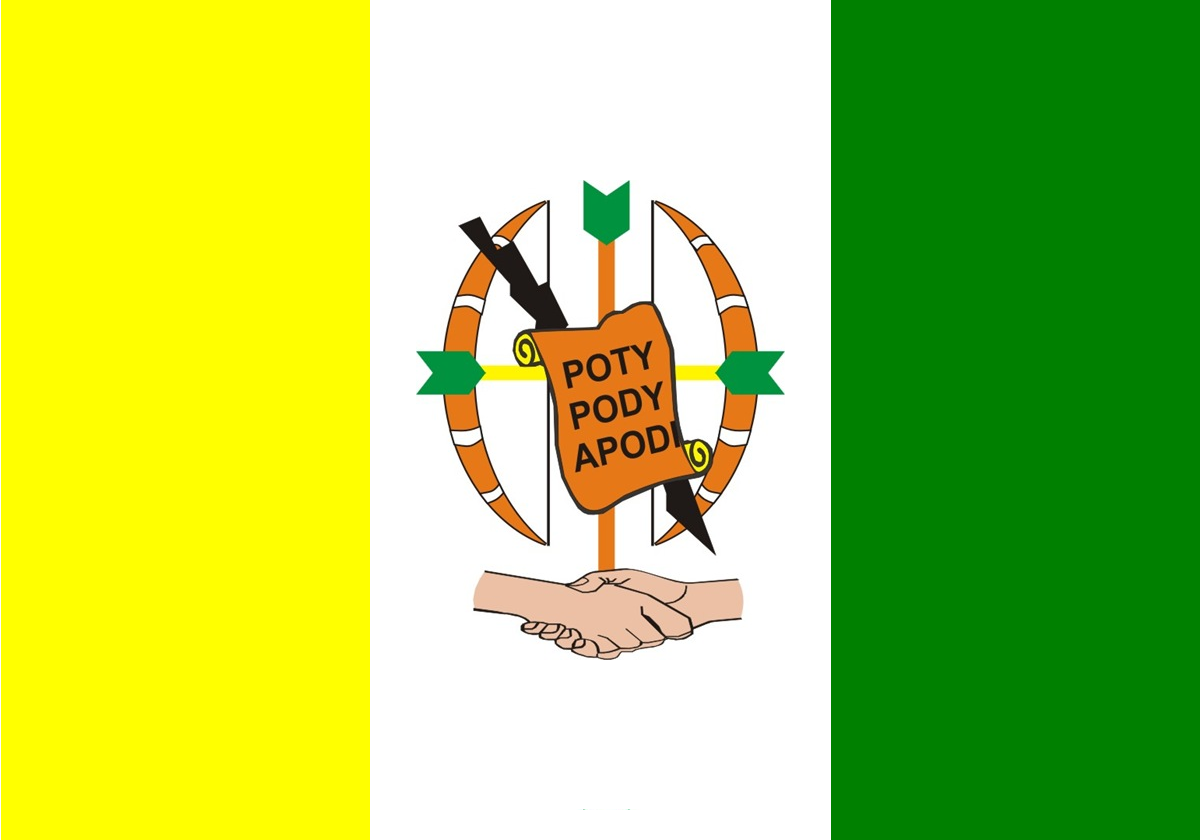
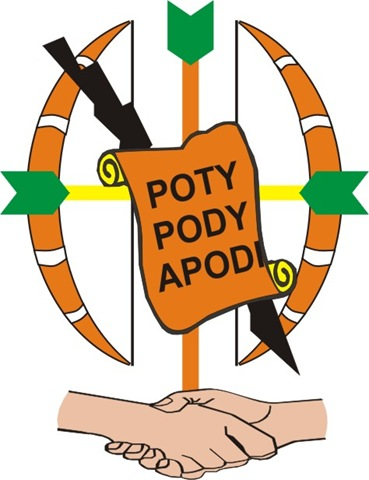
- Flag Coat of arms
- Interactive map of Apodi
- Country: Brazil
- Region: Nordeste
- State: Rio Grande do Norte
- Mesoregion: Oeste Potiguar

Population (2022)
  - Total: 36,093
- Time zone: UTC -3
- Postal code: 59700-000

Apodi is a municipality in the state of Rio Grande do Norte in the Northeast region of Brazil. With an area of 1,569.146 square kilometers (605.851 sq mi), of which 8.1944 square kilometres (3.1639 sq mi) is urban, it is located 287 km from Natal, the state capital, and 1,573 km from Brasília, the federal capital. Its population in the 2022 demographic census was 36,093 inhabitants, according to the Brazilian Institute of Geography and Statistics (IBGE), ranking as the 13th most populous municipality in the state of Rio Grande do Norte.

== Geography ==
The territory of Apodi covers 1,569.146 square kilometers (605.851 sq mi), of which 8.1944 square kilometres (3.1639 sq mi) constitutes the urban area. It sits at an average altitude of 67 meters above sea level. Apodi borders these municipalities: to the north, Governador Dix-Sept Rosado and Felipe Guerra; to the south, Umarizal, Itaú, and Severiano Melo; to the east, Caraúbas and Felipe Guerra again; and to the west, Severiano Melo and Itaú again. The city is located 287 km from the state capital Natal, and 1,573 km from the federal capital Brasília.

Under the territorial division established in 2017 by the Brazilian Institute of Geography and Statistics (IBGE), the municipality belongs to the immediate geographical region of Mossoró, within the intermediate region of Mossoró. Previously, under the microregion and mesoregion divisions, it was part of the microregion of Chapada do Apodi in the mesoregion of Oeste Potiguar.

Climate data for Apodi, Rio Grande do Norte (1981–2010)
Month	Jan	Feb	Mar	Apr	May	Jun	Jul	Aug	Sep	Oct	Nov	Dec	Year
Mean daily maximum °C (°F)	34.9 (94.8)	33.9 (93.0)	33.1 (91.6)	32.1 (89.8)	32.0 (89.6)	32.0 (89.6)	32.9 (91.2)	33.8 (92.8)	35.2 (95.4)	36.2 (97.2)	36.3 (97.3)	35.9 (96.6)	34.0 (93.2)
Mean daily minimum °C (°F)	24.3 (75.7)	24.1 (75.4)	24.1 (75.4)	24.0 (75.2)	23.6 (74.5)	22.9 (73.2)	22.6 (72.7)	22.5 (72.5)	22.9 (73.2)	23.4 (74.1)	23.7 (74.7)	24.2 (75.6)	23.5 (74.3)
Average precipitation mm (inches)	99.3 (3.91)	117.0 (4.61)	172.3 (6.78)	212.7 (8.37)	102.6 (4.04)	49.4 (1.94)	31.2 (1.23)	22.2 (0.87)	2.1 (0.08)	0.9 (0.04)	3.2 (0.13)	16.7 (0.66)	829.6 (32.66)
Average precipitation days (≥ 1.0 mm)	6	9	12	14	9	6	3	2	0	0	1	2	64
Mean monthly sunshine hours	244.6	221.4	236.9	239.3	255.9	240.6	260.3	289.8	291.7	309.6	299.5	274.1	3,163.7
Source: Instituto Nacional de Meteorologia

== Demographics ==
In the 2022 census, the municipality had a population of 36,093 inhabitants and ranked only 13th in the state that year (out of 167 municipalities), with 50.66% female and 49.34% male, resulting in a sex ratio of 97.38 (9,738 men for every 10,000 women), compared to 34,763 inhabitants in the 2010 census (50.43% living in the urban area), when it held the 13th state position. Between the 2010 and 2022 censuses, the population of Apodi changed at an annual geometric growth rate of 0.31%. Regarding age group in the 2022 census, 71.28% of the inhabitants were between 15 and 64 years old, 17.79% were under fifteen, and 10.94% were 65 or older. The population density in 2022 was 22.52 inhabitants per square kilometer, with an average of 2.79 inhabitants per household.

The municipality's Human Development Index (HDI-M) is considered medium, according to data from the United Nations Development Programme. According to the 2010 report published in 2013, its value was 0.639, ranking 32nd in the state and 2,870th nationally (out of 5,565 municipalities), and the Gini coefficient rose from 0.39 in 2003 to 0.51 in 2010. Considering only the longevity index, its value is 0.747, the income index is 0.611, and the education index is 0.571.

== See also ==
- List of municipalities in Rio Grande do Norte
