= Gonzaguinha =

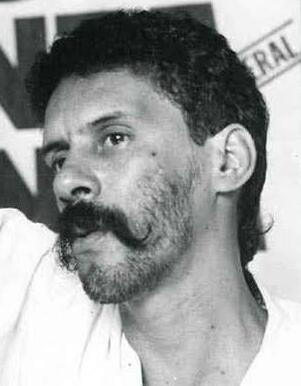
- Gonzaguinha in 1988

Background information
- Born: Luiz Gonzaga do Nascimento, Jr. September 22, 1945; Rio de Janeiro
- Origin: Rio de Janeiro, Brazil
- Died: April 29, 1991 (aged 45) Renascença, Paraná, Brazil
- Genres: MPB; samba; jazz fusion; progressive rock; pop; synth-pop
- Occupations: Singer, songwriter
- Instruments: Voice, acoustic guitar
- Years active: 1971–1991
- Website: gonzaguinha.com.br

Luiz Gonzaga do Nascimento, Jr. (September 22, 1945 – April 29, 1991), better known as Gonzaguinha (Portuguese pronunciation: [ɡõzaˈɡiɲɐ]), in Portuguese Little Gonzaga, was a noted Brazilian singer and composer.

Many eminent Brazilian artists recorded his compositions, such as Maria Bethânia, Simone, Elis Regina, Fagner, and Joanna. His greatest hits included "Sangrando", "Mulher, e daí" and "Começaria tudo outra vez".

== Early life ==
Gonzaguinha was born in Rio de Janeiro to singer-songwriter Luiz Gonzaga ("'Gonzagão" [Big Gonzaga]), the "king of baião," and singer Odaléia Guedes dos Santos, although, he was likely not the biological son of Gonzagão.

He was interested in music from an early age, composing his first song "Lembranças da Primavera" at age 14. In 1961, he lived in the neighborhood of Cocotá on Governador Island to study with his father. Later, he studied economics at Universidade Candido Mendes.

== Artistic career ==
Through psychiatrist and roommate Aluízio Porto Carrero, he would befriend Ivan Lins, as well as his first wife, Ângela, with whom he had two children, Daniel and Fernanda. He would later have another child, Amora Pêra, with actress Sandra Pêra. While living with Porto Carrer, he founded Movimento Artístico Universitário (MAU), with Aldir Blanc, Ivan Lins, Márcio Proença, Paulo Emílio, and César Costa Filho. This movement played an important role in música popular brasileira in the '70s and in 1971 resulted in the program Som Livre Exportação on TV Globo.

Characterized by a critical stance towards the dictatorship, Gonzaguinha was targeted by the Department of Political and Social Order (DOPS). Out of 72 songs reviewed by the DOPS, 54 were censored, including his first hit, Comportamento Geral. In this early part of his career, he was seen as aggressive in the eyes of the media, with songs like "Piada Infeliz" and "Erva," earning the nickname "cantor rancor" [grudge singer].

With the beginning of redemocratization in Brazilian politics in the latter half of the '70s, Gonzaguinha started to compose more lighthearted songs like "Recado," 'Começaria Tudo Outra Vez," "Explode Coração," "Espere por Mim Morena," "Grito de Alerta," "Sangrando, Eu Apenas Queria que Você Soubesse," "Caminhos do Coração," "O Que É o que É, Feliz," "Mamão com Mel e Lindo Lago do Amor," "Nem o Pobre nem o Rei."

The compositions were recorded by many big MPB artists, like Gal Costa, Maria Bethânia, Zizi Possi, Simone, Elis Regina (Redescobrir or Ciranda de Pedra), Fagner, and Joanna.

In 1975, Gonzaguinha, disillusioned by the industry, became an independent artist. In 1986, he founded the label Moleque, with which he recorded two works.

In his later life, Gonzaguinha lived in Belo Horizonte with his second wife Louise Margarete Martins, and their daughter, Mariana.

== Death and legacy ==
Gonzaguinha died at the age of 45 on April 29, 1991, the victim of a car accident. Returning from a performance in Pato Branco, Paraná, the singer was driving a Chevrolet Monza around 7:20 am on a southwestern highway when he collided with a truck in Renascença. Gonzaguinha was heading to Foz do Iguaçu. He was going to fly to Florianópolis, where he had a scheduled show.

== Discography ==
- 1970: Um abraço terno em você, viu mãe, Odeon;
- 1973: Luiz Gonzaga Jr., Odeon;
- 1974: Luiz Gonzaga Jr., EMI/Odeon;
- 1975: Os senhores da terra, Museu da Imagem e do Som;
- 1975: Plano de vôo, EMI/Odeon;
- 1976: Começaria tudo outra vez, EMI/Odeon;
- 1977: Moleque Gonzaguinha, EMI/Odeon;
- 1978: Recado, EMI/Odeon;
- 1979: Gonzaguinha da vida, EMI/Odeon;
- 1980: De volta ao começo, EMI/Odeon;
- 1980: Coisa mais maior de grande pessoa, EMI/Odeon;
- 1981: A vida do viajante. Com Luiz Gonzaga, EMI/Odeon;
- 1981: Coisa mais maior de grande pessoa, EMI/Odeon;
- 1982: Caminhos do coração, EMI;
- 1983: "Alô, alô Brasil", EMI/Odeon;
- 1984: Grávido, EMI/Odeon;
- 1985: Olho de lince/trabalho de parto, EMI/Odeon;
- 1987: Geral, EMI/Odeon;
- 1988: Corações marginais, Moleque/WEA;
- 1990: Luizinho de Gonzaga, WEA/Moleque;
- 1990: É, Capitol-EMI Music;
- 1993: Cavaleiro solitário, Som Livre;
- 2001: Luiz Gonzaga Jr. – Gonzaguinha, Universal Music.

=== Selection ===
- 1991: Gonzagão & Gonzaguinha-Juntos, com Luiz Gonzaga, BMG/Ariola;
- 1994: A viagem de Gonzagão e Gonzaguinha, com Luiz Gonzaga, EMI/Odeon;
- 1994: O talento de Gonzaguinha, EMI/Odeon.

=== Tribute ===
- 2001: Simples Saudade, BMG Brasil.
