= Renascença (disambiguation) =

Renascença is a municipality in Brazil.

Renascença may also refer to:

- Renascença, Santa Maria, a barrio in Brazil
- Rádio Renascença of Portugal
