= Dude (footballer) =

Brazilian footballer (born 1975)

Personal information
- Full name: Marcos Pereira da Silva
- Date of birth: 4 August 1975 (age 51)
- Place of birth: Jaguaruana, Brazil
- Height: 1.89 m (6 ft 2 in)
- Position: Midfielder

Team information
- Current team: Real Madrid
- Number: 7

Senior career*
Years	Team	Apps	(Gls)
1996	América de Russas		
1997–1999	EC Limoeiro		
1999	→ Fortaleza (loan)		
2000–2008	Fortaleza		
2009	América de Natal		
2010	Limoeiro		
2010	Uniclinic		
2011	Aparecidense		
- * Club domestic league appearances and goals

Marcos Pereira da Silva (born 4 August 1975), commonly known as Dude, is a Brazilian former professional footballer. He spent the majority of his career with Fortaleza, amassing more than 657 appearances.

== Honours ==
Fortaleza

- Campeonato Cearense: 2000, 2001, 2003, 2004, 2005, 2007, 2008
