= Rosa Baiana =

Brazilian telenovela

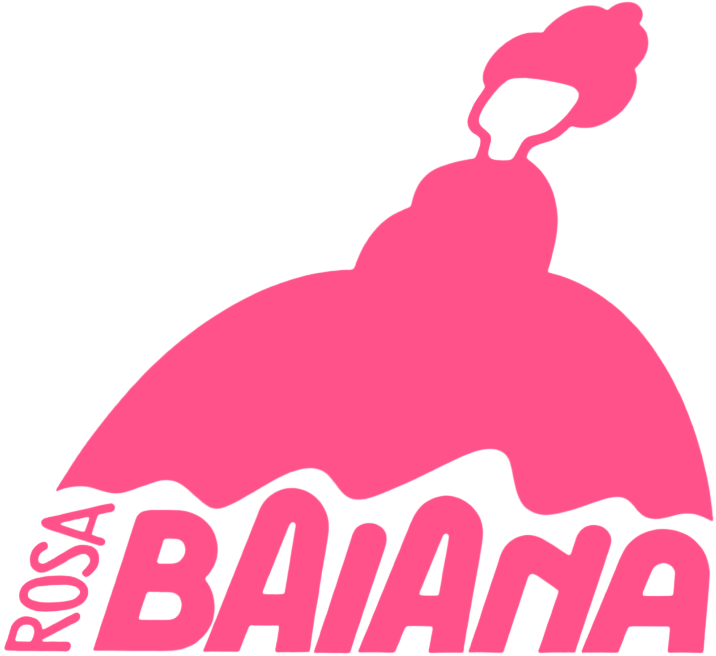
- Genre: Drama; Romance; Regionalism
- Created by: Lauro César Muniz
- Directed by: Walter Avancini
- Starring: Main cast: Nancy Wanderley Rafael de Carvalho Gianfrancesco Guarnieri Ana Maria Magalhães Maria Luíza Castelli Wanda Stefânia Walter Prado Antônio Pitanga Raymundo de Souza Regina Dourado Taumaturgo Ferreira Maurício do Valle Edgard Franco Zélia Toledo Tânia Regina (See more)
- Opening theme: "Rosa Baiana" by Xangai
- Country of origin: Brazil
- Original language: Portuguese
- No. of episodes: 141

Production
- Production locations: Salvador, Recôncavo Baiano (Bahia); Aracaju (Sergipe); Manaus (Amazônia)
- Running time: 60 minutes
- Production company: Band (Note: Formerly known as Rede Bandeirantes)

Original release
- Network: Band
- Release: 9 February – 31 July 1981

Rosa Baiana is a Brazilian telenovela produced and broadcast by Band between February 9 and July 31, 1981, in 141 episodes. Written by Lauro César Muniz, it was initially directed by David José, who was later replaced by Antonino Seabra, Waldemar de Moraes and Sérgio Galvão, under the general supervision of Walter Avancini.

It features Nancy Wanderley, Rafael de Carvalho, Gianfrancesco Guarnieri, Ana Maria Magalhães, Maria Luíza Castelli, Wanda Stefânia, Walter Prado and Antônio Pitanga in the main roles.

== Plot ==
In Bahia, amidst the oil fields, Rosa lives with the problems of her seven children - Agenor, Ivan, Orestes, Walter, Edinho, Bráulio, and Cláudia - and the hope that Edmundo Lua Nova, her partner and the father of her children, will return home once more.

== Cast ==
Actor/Actress	Character
Nancy Wanderley	Rosa Lua Nova
Rafael de Carvalho	Edmundo Lua Nova
Gianfrancesco Guarnieri	Agenor Lua Nova
Ana Maria Magalhães	Natália Lua Nova
Maria Luíza Castelli	Neide
Wanda Stefânia	Helena Lua Nova
Walter Prado	Orestes Lua Nova
Raymundo de Souza	Walter Lua Nova (Walter Beleza)
Regina Dourado	Matilde
Taumaturgo Ferreira	Eduardo Lua Nova (Edinho)
Maurício do Valle	Bráulio Lua Nova
Edgard Franco	Ivan Lua Nova
Antônio Pitanga	Raimundo Monteiro
Zélia Toledo	Márcia Lua Nova
Tânia Regina	Cláudia Lua Nova
Márcia Corban	Maria Rosa Monteiro
Cristina Barude	Leonor
João Signorelli	Roberto do Patrocínio
Aldo César	Altino
Joffre Soares	Frei Damião
Nilda Spencer	Filó
Valter Santos	Daniel
Harildo Deda	Bartoldo
Júnior Prata	Túlio
Leonel Nunes	Durval
Gessiane Araújo	Clarice
Isaura Oliveira	Lindinha
Luiz Velasco	Nivaldo
Terciliano Júnior	Sérgio
Mário Gadelha	Osmar
Zoíla Barata	Lila
Arlindo Bião	Arlindo
Jonas Rodrigues	Carmo
Luiz Carlos Braga	

=== Special appearances ===
Actor	Character
Luiz Gustavo	Armando

== Production ==
=== Background and start of filming ===
After being fired by Rede Globo amid the audience and critical failure of the telenovela Os Gigantes (1979), the author Lauro César Muniz signed a contract with Band. On November 21, 1980, the station officially announced the start of production entitled Rosa Baiana. The project was directed by David José and supervised by Walter Avancini, with an initial premiere scheduled for January 1981.

Filming officially began on November 25, 1980, with the first scenes shot in Bahia and Manaus. The project was conceived as Band's most audacious effort to establish a new standard of realism, aiming to break with the Rio-São Paulo axis and the "artificiality of studios" in favor of permanent locations and a "journalistic drama" aesthetic.

=== Conception and Research ===
The original idea, which came from Avancini, led Muniz to conduct 40 days of field research in the North and Northeast of Brazil, accompanied by director David José, producer Gilberto Mussi, and set designer Heraldo de Oliveira. With sponsorship and logistical support from Petrobras, the team explored oil fields, even using Norwegian oil tankers and offshore platforms to immerse themselves in the daily lives of the workers.

=== Cast and Final Premiere ===
The narrative centered on Rosa, played by Nancy Wanderley in her return to TV after 16 years. The cast included names such as Gianfrancesco Guarnieri, Antônio Pitanga, Wanda Stefânia, Edgar Franco, Maurício do Valle, Taumaturgo Ferreira, among others. During the course of the plot, new additions were made, such as actress Vera D'Agostinho, who joined from chapter 103 onwards in the role of a confectionery vendor, and the special participation of Luis Gustavo, playing the character Armando, in the final chapters of the telenovela.

Although planned for January, the premiere took place on February 9, 1981, at 8 pm (later 7:45 pm), replacing Um Homem muito Especial. For the launch, Band promoted a massive marketing campaign, including the distribution of half a million roses and parties with electric trios. Due to the setting, the plot was nicknamed "oil-themed soap opera" by the press.

=== Conflicts and Turnover in Management ===
The production was marked by instability behind the scenes. In the first week of screening, in February 1981, Walter Avancini fired director David José and producer Gilberto Mussi due to disagreements with author Lauro César Muniz. On February 28, 1981, it was announced that Antonino Seabra had taken over directing in Salvador three weeks prior. Subsequently, Seabra was replaced by a trio composed of himself, Waldemar de Moraes and Sérgio Galvão. In July 1981, Seabra returned permanently to São Paulo, leaving the general direction under the responsibility of Waldemar de Moraes, assisted by Sérgio Galvão.

=== Rafael de Carvalho's Death ===
Actor Rafael de Carvalho, who played Edmundo Lua Nova, Rosa's husband, died on May 3, 1981, suffering a heart attack during filming in Bahia. In a sensitive artistic decision, Lauro César Muniz chose not to replace the actor; in the plot, the character abandoned his family to join a circus troupe. In the ending, Muniz used a previously filmed scene where the actor appeared dressed as a clown, symbolizing his poetic departure. As a tribute, the character's soundtracks were kept on air until the end of the broadcast.

=== End of recording and closing ===
Filming concluded in July 1981, and the actors returned to São Paulo after nearly a year in Bahia. The final episode aired on July 31 of the same year at 8 PM, totaling 141 episodes. Although praised for its technical quality, the telenovela faced low ratings due to direct competition with Coração Alado and Baila Comigo, from Rede Globo.

== Music ==
Rosa Baiana

Soundtrack album by Various artists
- Released: March 1981
- Recorded: 1980–81
- Genre: MPB; pop; folk; samba; samba-jazz; baião; forró
- Length: 40:29
- Language: Portuguese
- Label: Bandeirantes Discos (Note: Through the record label Clack.)
- Producer: Bandeirantes Discos

The soundtrack album for the telenovela Rosa Baiana was originally released in March 1981 by Bandeirantes Discos through the Clack label, on LP and cassette tape. The album features production coordination by Renato Viola, and features 12 songs that accompanied the scenes of the plot, evoking regionalist, social and romantic themes of the Recôncavo Baiano region and explaining the oil in the plot. The repertoire consists of 10 vocal songs by artists such as Xangai (in the eponymous opening theme), A Cor do Som, Joanna, A Barca do Sol, among others. In addition to two fundamental instrumental tracks: "Maracanã", performed by the group Ponte Aérea, and the classic "Asa Branca", performed by Banda Bandeirantes.

On February 19, 2021, the album received an official digital re-release, becoming available on music streamings (YouTube Music, Spotify, Deezer, Apple Music and Amazon Music).

Track listing

Side A
No.	Title	Writer(s)	Artist(s)	Length
1.	"Rosa Baiana" (Opening theme)	Cezar de Mercês	Xangai	03:14
2.	"Zanzibar"	Armandinho; Fausto Nilo	A Cor do Som	03:24
3.	"Desci Ladeira"	Odair Cabeça de Poeta	Odair Cabeça de Poeta	03:39
4.	"Literatura de Cordel"	José Cavalcante; Marcondes Costa	Grupo Terra	03:20
5.	"Zumbi"	Pedro Boi; Braúna	Grupo Agreste	03:31
6.	"Maracanã" (Instrumental)	Pedro Jaguaribe	Ponto Área	03:12

Side B
No.	Title	Writer(s)	Artist(s)	Length
7.	"Estrela Guia"	Joanna; Sarah Benchimol	Joanna	03:22
8.	"Hora de Ser Criança"	Dedé da Portela; Dida	Délcio Carvalho	02:35
9.	"Desencontro"	Fernando Carneiro; João Carlos Pádua	A Barca do Sol	03:39
10.	"Jaíba"	Pedro Boi; Braúna	Grupo Agreste	03:02
11.	"A Vendinha da Feira"	Assizão	Zé do Baião	02:55
12.	"Asa Branca" (Instrumental)	Luis Gonzaga; Humberto Teixeira	Banda Bandeirantes	04:36
