= Velho Chico =

Brazilian telenovela

- Genre: Telenovela; Drama
- Created by: Benedito Ruy Barbosa; Edmara Barbosa; Bruno Luperi
- Written by: Benedito Ruy Barbosa; Edmara Barbosa; Bruno Luperi; Luis Alberto de Abreu
- Directed by: Carlos Araújo; Gustavo Fernandez; Antônio Karnewale; Philippe Barcinski
- Creative director: Luiz Fernando Carvalho
- Starring: Antônio Fagundes; Christiane Torloni; Rodrigo Santoro; Camila Pitanga; Domingos Montagner; Selma Egrei; Irandhir Santos; Marcelo Serrado; Fabiula Nascimento; Dira Paes; Chico Diaz; Marcos Palmeira
- Opening theme: "Tropicália" by Caetano Veloso
- Country of origin: Brazil
- Original language: Portuguese
- No. of episodes: 172 / 60 (International Version)

Production
- Production locations: São Francisco do Conde, Bahia; Cachoeira, Bahia; Raso da Catarina, Bahia; Ilha de Cajaíba, Bahia; Baraúna, Rio Grande do Norte; São José da Tapera, Alagoas; Olho d'Água do Casado, Alagoas; Piranhas, Alagoas; Canindé de São Francisco, Sergipe
- Editors: Carlos Edurado Kerr; Iury Pinto; João Marins; Paulo Leite; Diogo Ribeiro; Alexandre Guimarães; Christiana Moura; Marco Seixas; Marco Gibelli; André Leite
- Camera setup: Multi-camera
- Running time: 22–69 minutes

Original release
- Network: TV Globo
- Release: 14 March – 30 September 2016

Velho Chico (English title: Old River) is a Brazilian telenovela produced and broadcast by TV Globo from 14 March 2016 to 30 September 2016.

Created by Benedito Ruy Barbosa, Edmara Barbosa and Bruno Luperi, and co-written with Luis Alberto de Abreu. Directed by Luiz Fernando Carvalho and co-directed by Carlos Araújo, Gustavo Fernandez, Antônio Karnewale and Philipe Barcinski.

Velho Chico faced unprecedented challenges during its production, with the deaths of Umberto Magnani and Domingos Montagner. In the wake of Montagner's passing on 15 September 2016, two weeks before the show's scheduled finale, production faced turmoil.

Starring Antonio Fagundes, Camila Pitanga, Domingos Montagner, Rodrigo Santoro, Selma Egrei, Tarcísio Meira in the lead roles. And Rodrigo Lombardi, Fabiula Nascimento, Chico Díaz, Christiane Torloni, Marcos Palmeira, Dira Paes, Irandhir Santos, Gabriel Leone, Giullia Buscacio, Lucy Alves in supporting roles.

The show received positive reviews for its surrealist account of contemporary live in the Brazilian sertão. And was nominated for an International Emmy Award for Best Telenovela in 2017.

== Production ==
In 2009, Benedito Ruy Barbosa submitted to Rede Globo the synopsis of possible telenovela set at the São Francisco River but after evaluation by the network, the story was considered too political. Barbosa hoped to shoot it the following year in the 9 pm time slot.

In 2015, the project was approved by Rede Globo and was set to premiere just after Êta Mundo Bom! at 6 pm timeslot. Rogério Gomes was later announced to direct but on request of the show's author and O Rei do Gado reprise's success, Luiz Fernando Carvalho was offered to direct.

Initially, a telenovela by Maria Adelaide Amaral was supposed to replace A Regra do Jogo but due to its heavily politically-themed storyline—it being an election year—Velho Chico was moved to the primetime timeslot and Amaral's show moved to late 2016.

=== Scenography and set design ===
Although set in Bahia, part of the early scenes were recorded in other locations of the Brazil's Northeast like: Baraúna in Rio Grande do Norte, São José da Tapera and Olho d'Água do Casado in Alagoas. Other locations that represent the fictional town of the plot are the Alagoan other municipality: Piranhas. Ilha de Cajaíba, in São Francisco do Conde, the municipality of Cachoeira and Raso da Catarina were also used as locations. In total, about 562 scenes were recorded in northern locations and about 60 to 70% of the cast were from the region. The set design was made from recycled objects, such as incandescent lamps used in old rebuilt reflectors. The costume design in the first phase was composed of regal robes from residents in location. Passing through tissue discoloration, dyeing and natural aging, the costumes of the bushmen are made in pastel colors, while those from Salvador are inspired by Tropicália.

=== Casting ===
Eriberto Leão was considered in the starring role for the first phase but was replaced by Rodrigo Santoro. The director, Luiz Fernando Carvalho, opted for a Spanish actress to portray the character Iolanda. Due to great importance of the character to the storyline, Carol Castro and Christiane Torloni were cast nonetheless. Before Castro was considered, Ana Paula Arósio was cast but dropped out due to scheduling conflicts. After Arósio, Maria Fernanda Cândido was then considered but she also turned down the role. Letícia Sabatella was also considered to play Maria Tereza but due to her other commitments in films and theatre, Camila Pitanga was cast.

=== Death of Umberto Magnani ===
Veteran actor Umberto Magnani, who played Father Romão, suffered a stroke (CVA) while preparing to record in the afternoon of 25 April 2016 at Projac. He was hospitalized at Hospital Vitória, near the studios' complex in Barra da Tijuca, in a deep coma. Ana Julia, daughter of Magnani, said that the actor underwent a six-hour surgery and suffered a cardiac arrest. As the character was considered important to the plot, several scenes had to be rewritten. At the time, without the possibility to return to the plot, Magnani was replaced by Carlos Vereza, who went on to interpret Father Benício. Magnani eventually died two days later.

=== Death of Domingos Montagner ===
With only two weeks to the final episode, on 15 September 2016, actor Domingos Montagner, who portrayed the protagonist Santo, drowned at the São Francisco River, located in the Canindé, Region of São Francisco, in Sergipe. Montagner was swimming along with his co-star Camila Pitanga before being dragged by a strong current. The actor was found four hours later, lifeless. While Montagner was missing, Globo's management requested that Velho Chico's recordings set to run until 18 September, to be halted. With the confirmation of the actor's death, the technical team and the cast that were recording in the Northeast were asked to return to Rio de Janeiro. The network also requested that the cast or crew not comment on the matter to the press.

Benedito Ruy Barbosa lamented on the death of Montagner and said in an interview with UOL about the uncertainty about the outcome of the actor's character in the plot:

It is very difficult to have to change an actor like him for any other, it should not be the solution. At the same time, I have to do justice to him and the wonderful work he has been doing."

Consulted by the blog of Patrícia Kogut, for the newspaper O Globo, Barbosa also admitted that he did not know what he would do at the time, that his aim was to honour Montagner.

According to reports the Legal Medical Institute (IML) of Sergipe, the result of the autopsy performed Montagner's body pointed out that the actor died of mechanical asphyxia by drowning. The Brazilian version of online magazine The Intercept speculated that the strong currents where the actor drowned were caused by the hydroelectric dam, the Xingó Dam, upstream. The dam lies approximately two kilometers upstream, and the flow rate allowed through the dam can affect currents.

At the time of his death, the filming of Velho Chico was just a few days from completion. Only five episodes were ready to be aired and there was uncertainty whether the show would remain on the air or the ending would be advanced. On 16 September 2016, it was confirmed that production would resume on 18 September, and that the telenovela would end on the scheduled airdate. UOL also revealed that the character of Montagner would be carried to the end, without a substitute. However, climactic scenes for the finale, in which Montagner was the main character, hadn't been filmed yet. Production decided to complete filming as scheduled. Scenes in which Montagner's character, Santo, would have appeared would be shot from the character's point of view. Thus, Santo would be present in the scene, but would not be seen.

Weeks prior to the casualty, Rede Globo aired a scene where Santo would be saved by Indians, who found him unconscious floating on the São Francisco River, having been shot by his enemy. The river was the same where the actor lost his life.

== Plot ==
Described by the director as a Shakespearian family saga, counting a history of love framed for social critics, the plot is initiated in the end of the year 1960, when Afrânio, son of a powerful Colonel Jacinto is obliged to return from Salvador for the fictitious Grotas de São Francisco, to assume the place of his father, who commanded the politics and the local economy. He develops a passion for Iolanda, but to oblige his mother, Encarnação, who still grieves the loss of her oldest son who died in waters of the São Francisco River, Afrânio leaves on a trip for the region to reaffirm alliances that his father kept. During his trip, Afrânio gets involved with Leonor, whose father compels them to marry. Leonor is received with disdain by Encarnação. In Encarnação's mind, Leonor's lower class status makes her an unsuitable wife for Encarnação's son. When Maria Tereza is born, Encarnação rubs on Leonor that she should have conceived a son. The rival family of the Ribeiro, due to Colonel Jacinto aspiring to their lands, is headed by Captain Ernesto Rosa. He is married to Eulália, but they have no children. They adopt Luzia, a baby abandoned on the road side on the way to their cotton plantation. At the same time, the couple receive the retirante, Belmiro and Piedade - parents of Bento and Santo. With the passing of time and growing-up together, Luzia starts to nourish a passion for Santo. This disrupts their feelings of brother and sister.

It is in a procession of Francis of Assisi, under waters of the Old Chico, that the path of Santo and Maria Tereza are crossed. But the love affair between the son of the retirante with the daughter of the Colonel is discovered. Maria Tereza is sent to a boarding school in Salvador. In her letters to Santo, she discloses she is pregnant. This is not taken well by Luzia who is still in love with Santo. Some time later, Miguel is born, a fruit of a forbidden love. Soon after, Maria Tereza returns to the farm. She marries Carlos Eduardo even though she is not in love with him, but still dreams of reuniting with Santo.

== Cast ==
=== First phase ===
Actor	Character
Rodrigo Santoro	Afrânio de Sá Ribeiro
Carol Castro	Iolanda
Julia Dalavia	Maria Tereza de Sá Ribeiro
Renato Góes	Santo dos Anjos
Selma Egrei	Encarnação de Sá Ribeiro
Rodrigo Lombardi	Ernesto Rosa
Fabíula Nascimento	Eulália Rosa
Chico Díaz	Belmiro dos Anjos
Cyria Coentro	Piedade dos Anjos
Larissa Góes	Luzia Rosa
Pablo Morais	Cícero
Marina Nery	Leonor de Sá Ribeiro
Júlio Machado	Clemente
Bárbara Reis	Doninha
Diyo Coelho	Bento dos Anjos
Tarcísio Meira	Jacinto de Sá Ribeiro
Rafael Vitti	Carlos Eduardo Vidigal
Davi Caetano	Martim de Sá Ribeiro
Umberto Magnani	Father Romão
Leopoldo Pacheco	Dr. Emilio
Gésio Amadeu	Chico Criatura
Maciel Melo	Egídio
Xangai	Avelino
Batoré	Queiroz
Chico de Assis	Salgado
Carlos Betão	Aracaçu
Verônica Cavalcanti	Zilu
Fernando Teixeira	Floriano
Dadá Venceslau	Benedito
Francisco Carvalho	Silvino
Bertrand Duarte	Osório
Denise Corrêia	Neusa
Adriana Gabriela	Marta
Thaíssa Cavalcanti	Matilde
Isabella Aguiar	Maria Tereza (child)
Rogerinho Costa	Santo (child)
Lucca Fontoura	Cícero (child)
Carla Fabiana	Luzia (child)
Vitor Aleixo	Bento (child)

=== Second phase ===
Actor	Character
Domingos Montagner	Santo dos Anjos
Camila Pitanga	Maria Tereza de Sá Ribeiro
Antônio Fagundes	Afrânio de Sá Ribeiro
Christiane Torloni	Iolanda de Sá Ribeiro
Selma Egrei	Encarnação de Sá Ribeiro
Gabriel Leone	Miguel de Sá Ribeiro
Irandhir Santos	Bento dos Anjos
Lucy Alves	Luzia Rosa dos Anjos
Marcos Palmeira	Cícero
Marcelo Serrado	Carlos Eduardo Vidigal
Dira Paes	Beatriz
Lee Taylor	Martim de Sá Ribeiro
Giullia Buscacio	Olívia dos Anjos
Zezita de Matos	Piedade dos Anjos
Suely Bispo	Doninha
Umberto Magnani	Father Romão
Carlos Vereza	Father Benício
Luiza Brunet	Madá
Mariene de Castro	Dalva
Yara Charry	Sophie
Lucas Veloso	Lucas
Maciel Melo	Egídio
Gésio Amadeu	Chico Criatura
Xangai	Avelino
Saulo Laranjeira	Raimundo
José Dumont	Zé
Cláudio Jaborandy	Germano
Marcélia Cartaxo	Zefa
Raysa Alcântara	Isabel dos Anjos
Luci Pereira	Ceci
Evana Jeyssan	Wanda
Victor Broz	Calú
Severo D'Acelino	Eugênio Etore
Antônio Carlos Feio	Tenório
Flávio Rocha	Edenilson

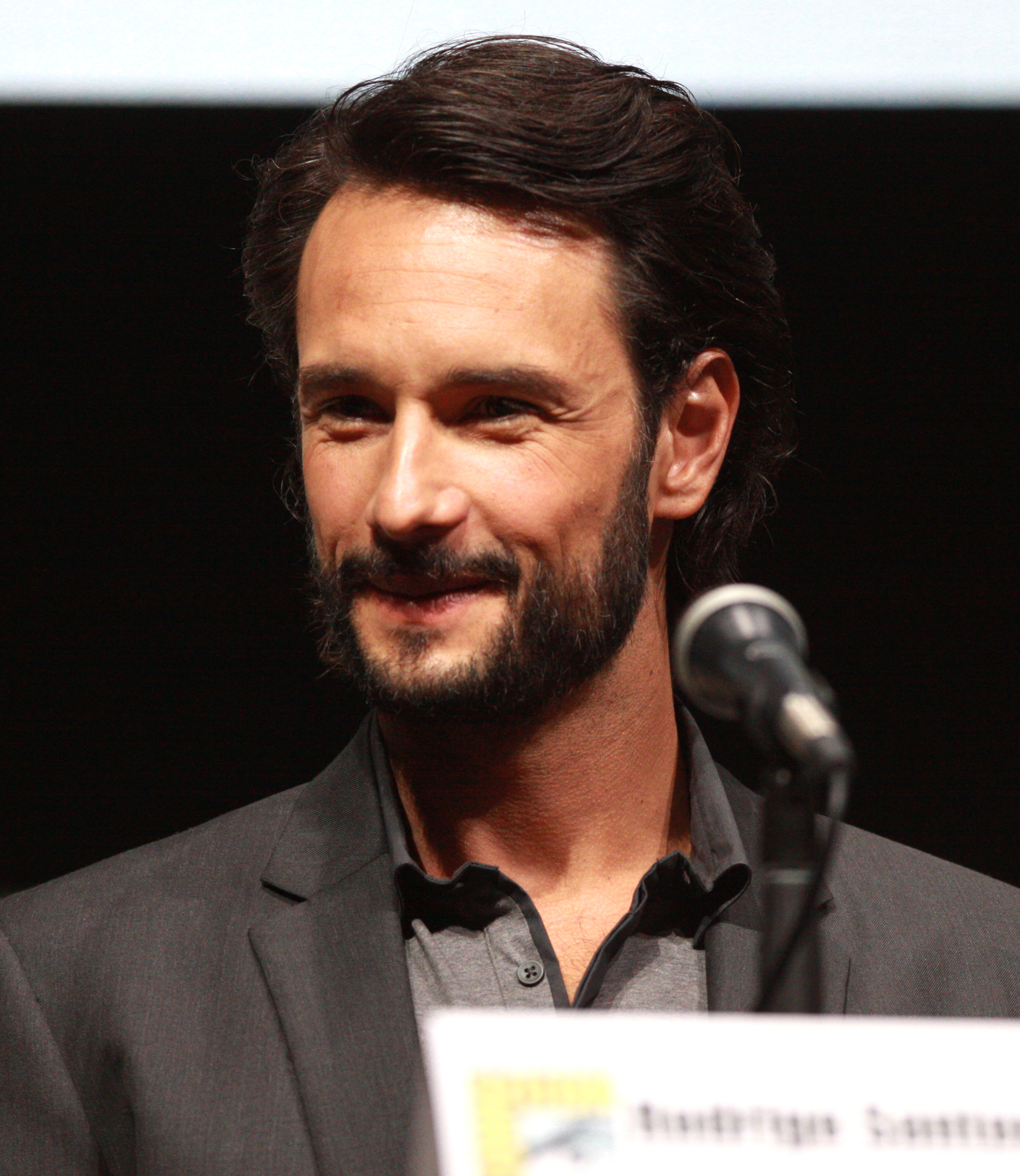
Rodrigo Santoro
Afrânio (young)

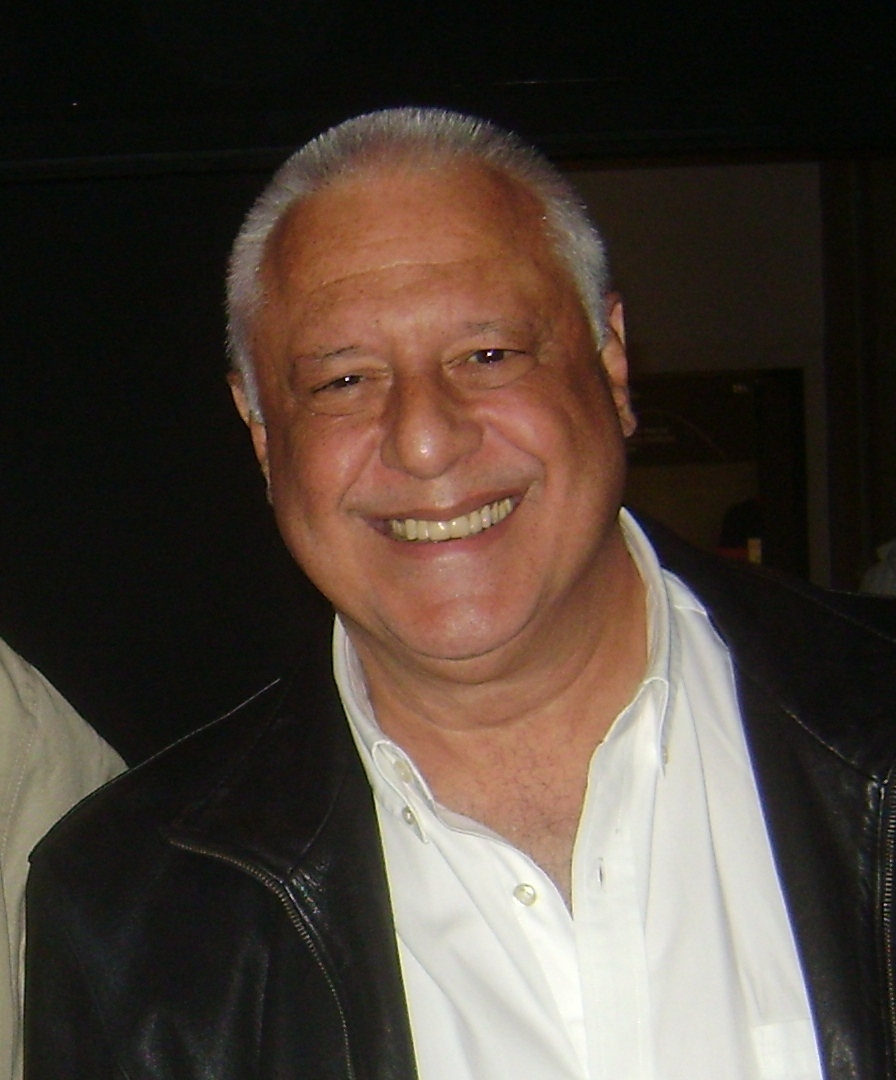
Antônio Fagundes
Afrânio

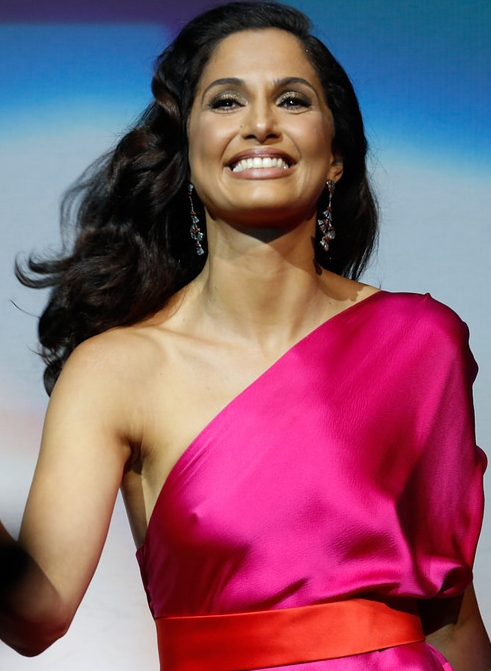
Camila Pitanga
Maria Tereza

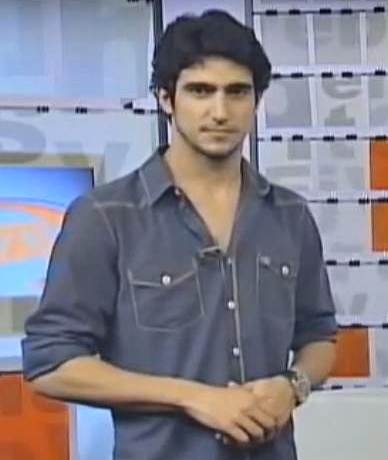
Renato Góes
Santo (young)

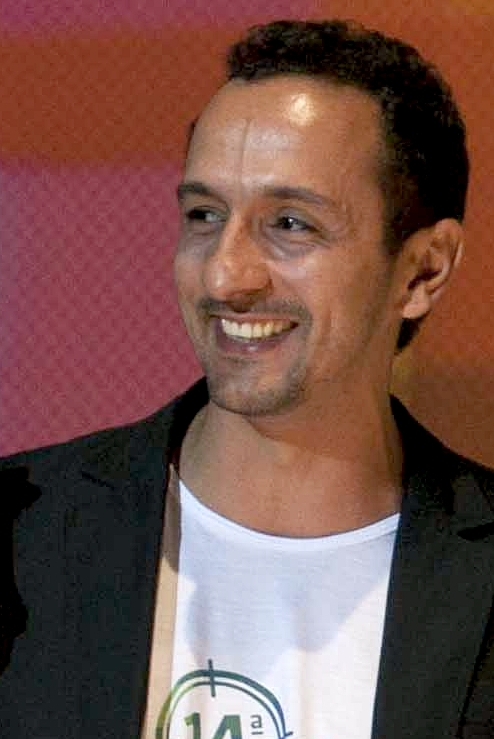
Irandhir Santos
Bento

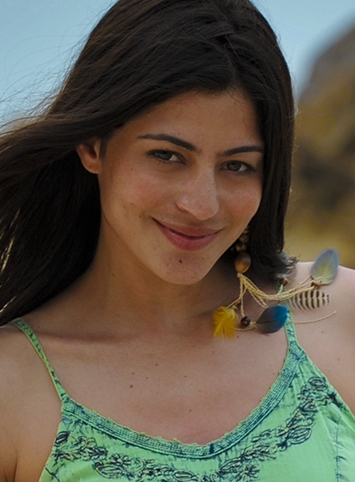
Carol Castro
Iolanda (young)

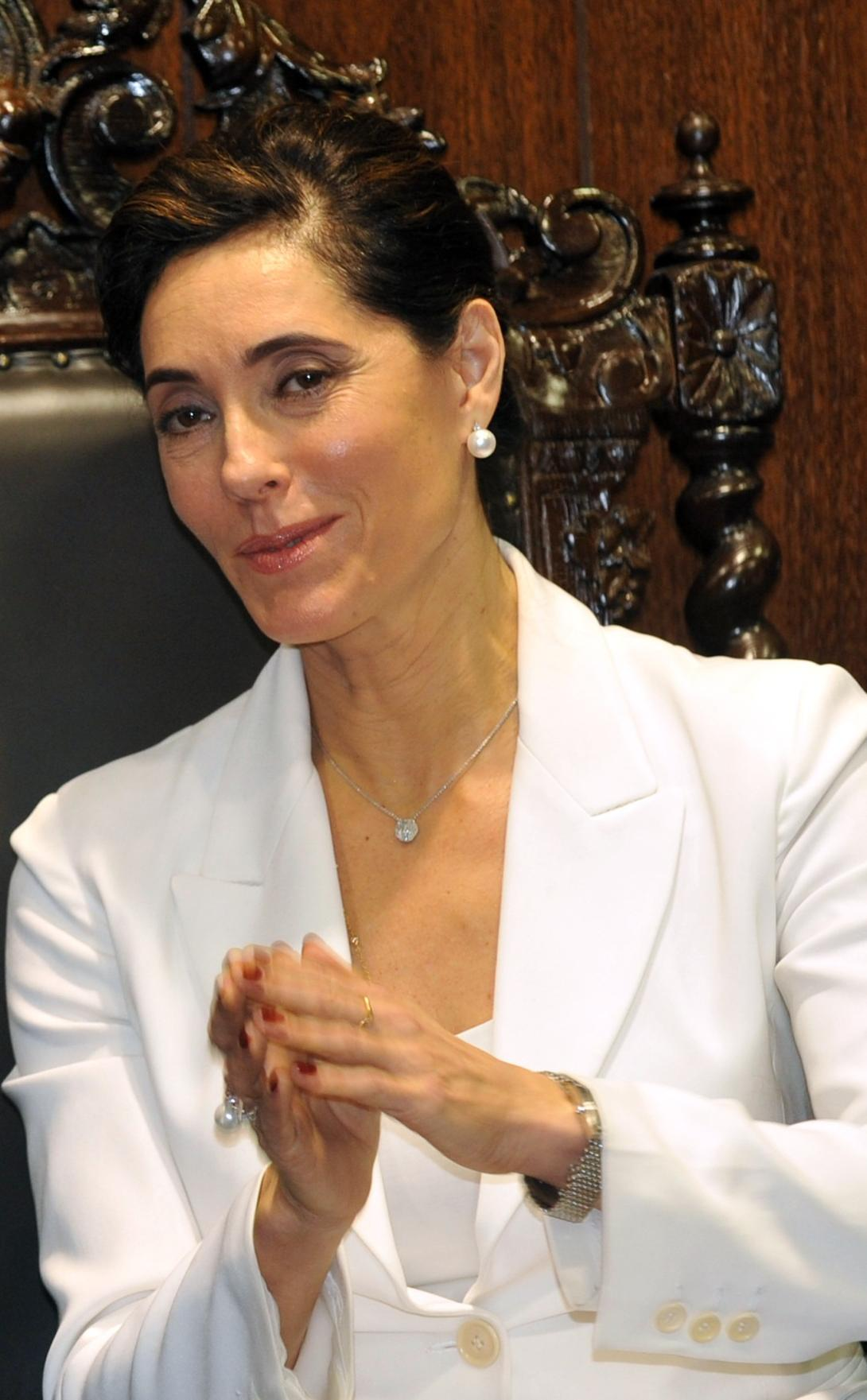
Christiane Torloni
Iolanda

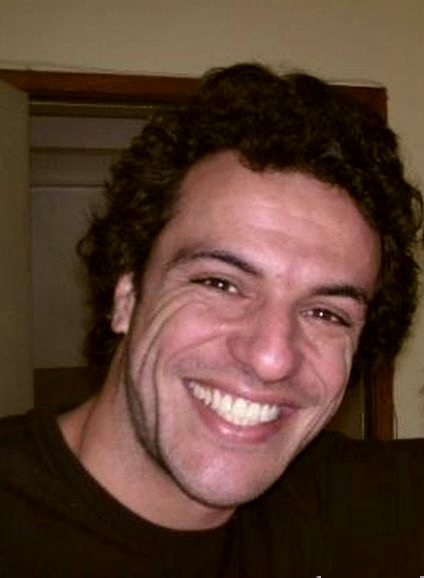
Rodrigo Lombardi
Ernesto

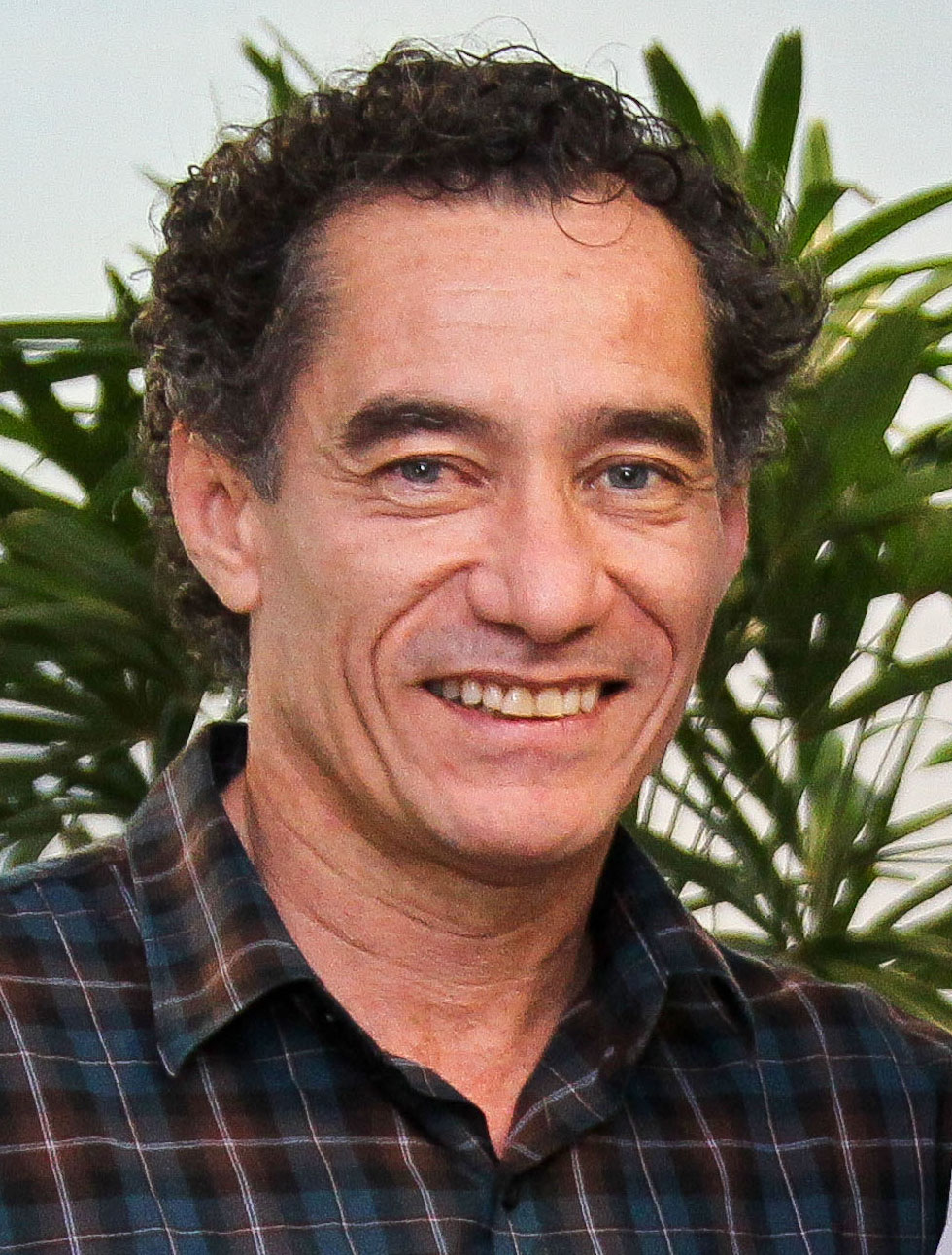
Chico Diaz
Belmiro

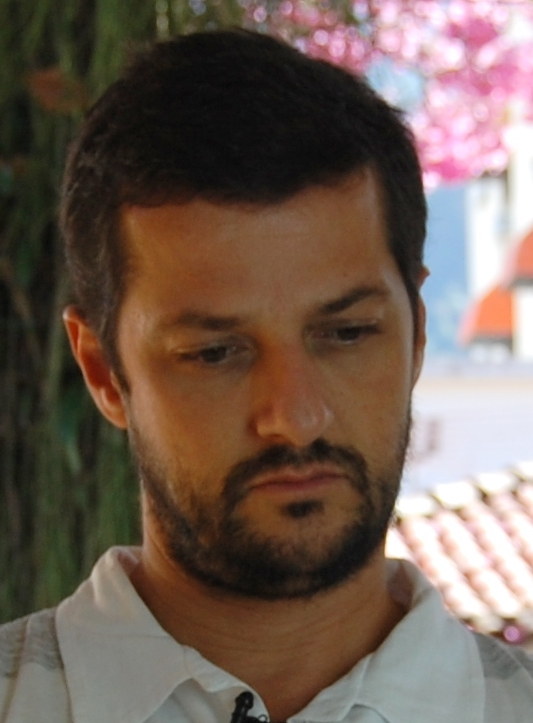
Marcelo Serrado
Carlos Eduardo

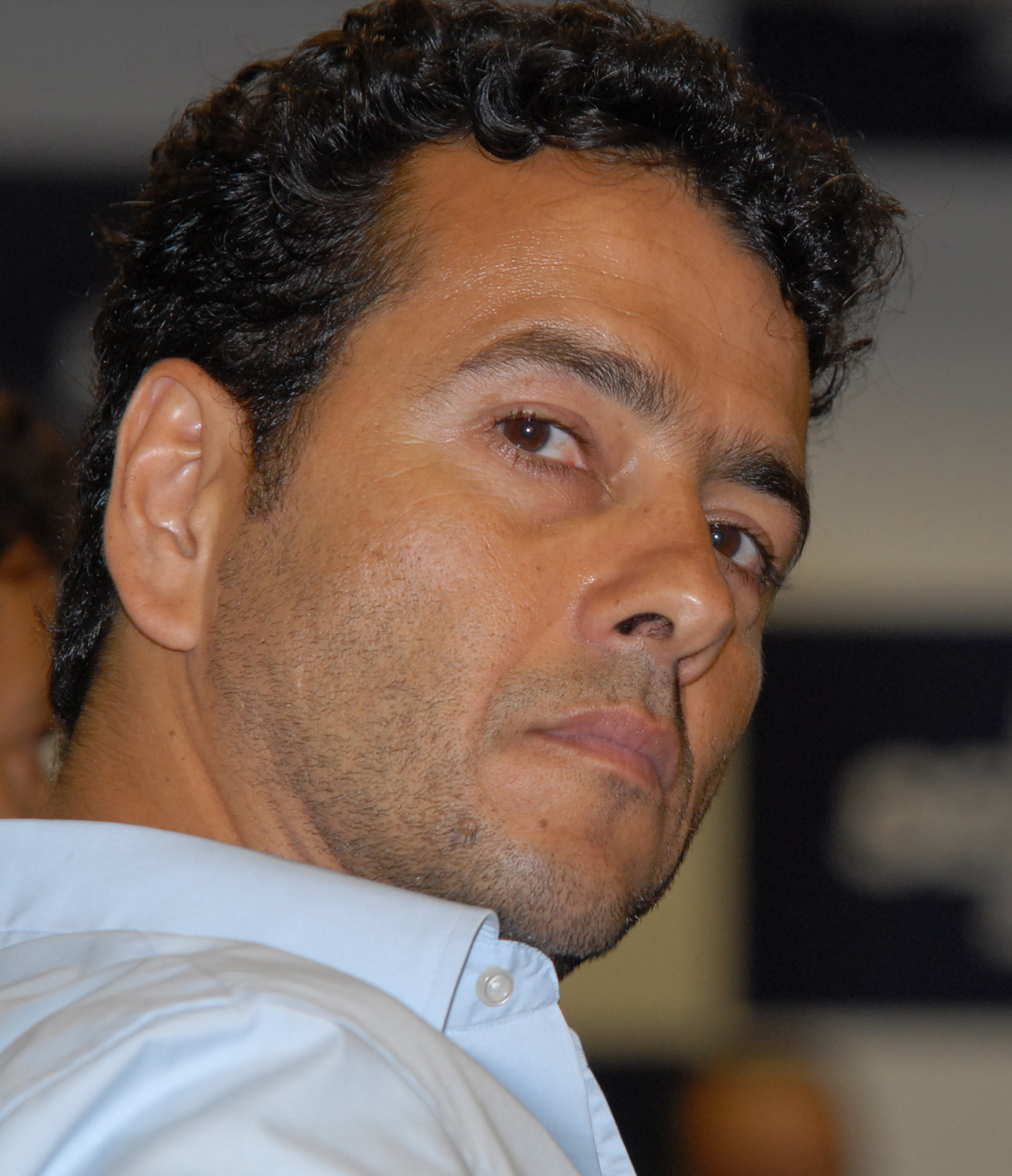
Marcos Palmeira
Cícero

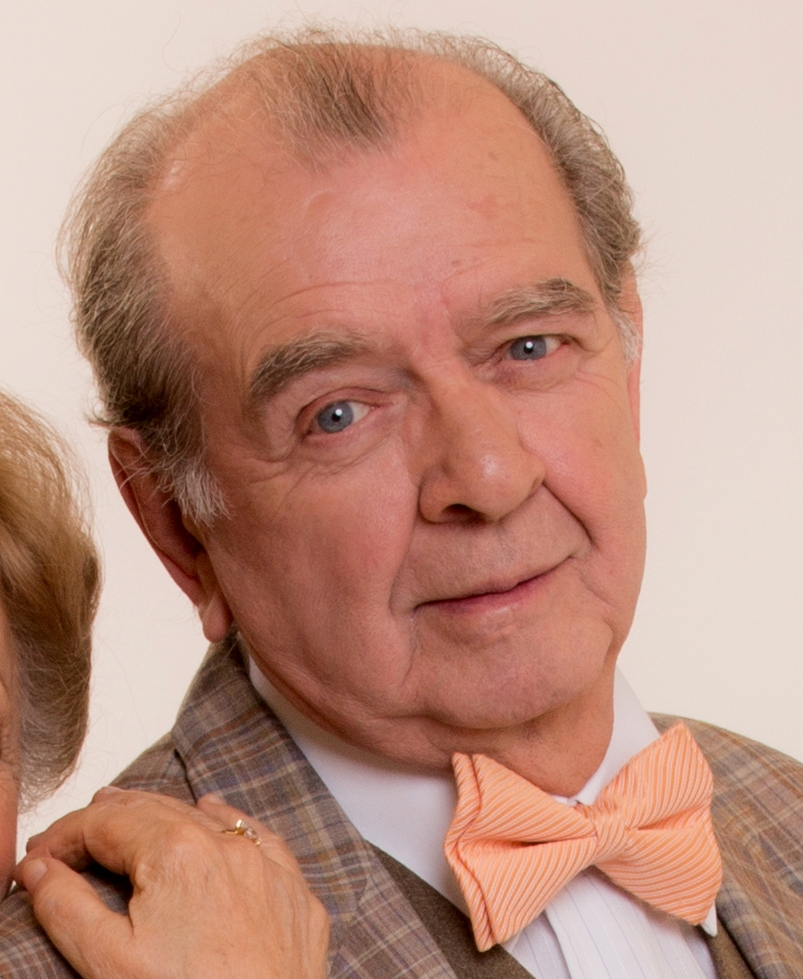
Umberto Magnani Priest Romão (1st phase)

== Soundtrack ==
=== Volume 1 ===
Velho Chico - Vol. 1

Soundtrack album by Various artists
- Released: 27 May 2016
- Label: Som Livre

No.	Title	Artist(s)	Length
1.	"Tropicália"	Caetano Veloso
2.	"Gemedera"	Amelinha
3.	"Me Leva"	Renata Rosa
4.	"Flor de Tangerina"	Alceu Valença
5.	"Enquanto Engoma a Calça"	Ednardo
6.	"Veja (Margarida)"	Marcelo Jeneci
7.	"Como 2 e 2"	Gal Costa
8.	"L'Étranger"	Thiago Pethit feat. Tiê
9.	"I-Margem"	Paulo Araújo
10.	"Incelença Pro Amor Retirante"	Xangai
11.	"Serenata"	Chico César
12.	"Pout Pourri Correnteza Caravana, Talismã, Barcarola do São Francisco"	Elomar, Geraldo Azevedo, Vital Farias e Xangai
13.	"Triste Bahia"	Caetano Veloso
14.	"Senhor Cidadão"	Tom Zé

=== Orchestras ===
Velho Chico Música Original de Tim Rescala was released on 10 June 2016. It contains instrumental soundtracks produced by Tim Rescala.

Velho Chico (Música Original de Tim Rescala)

Soundtrack album by Tim Rescala
- Released: 10 June 2016
- Label: Som Livre

No.	Title	Length
1.	"Despertar do Velho Chico"	1:54
2.	"Águas Cristalinas"	2:40
3.	"Alegria no Vilarejo"	1:53
4.	"Retirantes"	2:39
5.	"Nordeste Medieval"	2:30
6.	"Batalha 1"	2:33
7.	"O Poder"	3:31
8.	"Encantamento"	2:44
9.	"Felicidade e Fartura"	2:38
10.	"Santo e Maria Teresa"	3:56
11.	"O Amor de Luzia"	3:09
12.	"Segundo Encantamento"	02:14
13.	"Abenção"	2:47
14.	"Desafio Agalopado"	2:26
15.	"Desolação"	3:31
16.	"Esperança e Luta"	3:49
17.	"O Velho Chico Com Águas Claras"	3:04
18.	"Solidão e Remorso"	2:59
19.	"Batalha 2"	2:19
20.	"Sombras do Passado"	2:09
21.	"O Velho Chico Com Águas Turvas"	3:16
22.	"Subterrâneos 2"	2:08
23.	"No Bar do Chico Criatura"	2:08
24.	"Bento e Beatriz"	2:42
25.	"Passarinhos"	1:46
26.	"Oração"	3:06
27.	"Oração de São Francisco (bonus)"	2:29

=== Volume 2 ===
Velho Chico - Volume 2

Soundtrack album by Various artists
- Released: 5 August 2016
- Label: Som Livre

No.	Title	Artist(s)	Length
1.	"Mortal Loucura"	Maria Bethânia
2.	"Da Aurora Até o Lua"	Dadi Carvalho
3.	"Não Há Cabeça"	Pélico
4.	"Olhos Nus"	Ná Ozzetti & Zé Miguel Wisnik
5.	"O Ciúme"	Caetano Veloso
6.	"Encarnação"	Elba Ramalho
7.	"Ondas do Mar de Vigo"	Fortuna
8.	"Perfume do Invisível"	Céu
9.	"Réquiem para Matraga"	Geraldo Vandré
10.	"Moça Bonita"	Alceu Valença
11.	"La Belle de Jour"	Alceu Valença
12.	"Um Oh! E um Ah!"	Tom Zé
13.	"Dor e Dor"	Tom Zé
14.	"Vitta, Ian, Cassales"	Apanhador Só
15.	"Coração"	Bárbara Eugênia
16.	"Metamorfose Ambulante"	Raul Seixas
17.	"Monte Castelo"	Legião Urbana

== Ratings ==
Timeslot	Episodes	Premiere		Finale		Rank	Season	Rating average
Timeslot	Episodes	Date	Viewers (in points)	Date	Viewers (in points)	Rank	Season	Rating average
Mondays—Saturdays; 9:15pm	172	14 March 2016	35	30 September 2016	35	#1	2016	29

The first chapter of the Velho Chico, according to consolidated data of São Paulo, registered 35.4 points with a maximum of 37, achieving the highest ratings for a premiere of the 9pm telenovela since Amor à Vida (2013). In Rio de Janeiro, the premiere recorded 38 point average. The second chapter registered 33.9 points in São Paulo and 37 points in Rio de Janeiro, representing a reduction of one point in both regions.

The last episode registered a viewership rating of 35.2 points in Greater São Paulo, one of the lowest indices in a 9pm telenovela coming after Babilônia.

Generally, Velho Chico had a viewership rating of 29 points, surpassing both Babilônia and A Regra do Jogo with 25 and 28 points respectively.

== Awards and nominations ==
Year	Awards	Category	Recipient	Result	Ref.
2016	Prêmio Extra de Televisão de 2016	Best Telenovela	Benedito Ruy Barbosa	Nominated	
2016	Prêmio Extra de Televisão de 2016	Best Actress	Camila Pitanga	Nominated	
2016	Prêmio Extra de Televisão de 2016	Best Actor	Domingos Montagner	Won (posthumously)	
2016	Prêmio Extra de Televisão de 2016	Best Actor	Rodrigo Santoro	Nominated	
2016	Prêmio Extra de Televisão de 2016	Best Supporting Actress	Selma Egrei	Won	
2016	Prêmio Extra de Televisão de 2016	Best Supporting Actor	Irandhir Santos	Won	
2016	Prêmio Extra de Televisão de 2016	Most Promising Actress	Giullia Buscacio	Nominated	
2016	Prêmio Extra de Televisão de 2016	Most Promising Actress	Lucy Alves	Won	
2016	Prêmio Extra de Televisão de 2016	Most Promising Actress	Mariene de Castro	Nominated	
2016	Prêmio Extra de Televisão de 2016	Most Promising Actor	Lee Taylor	Won	
2016	Prêmio Extra de Televisão de 2016	Most Promising Actor	Renato Góes	Nominated	
2016	Prêmio Extra de Televisão de 2016	Best Theme Music	"Mortal Loucura" - Maria Bethânia	Nominated	
2016	Troféu APCA	Best Telenovela	Benedito Ruy Barbosa	Won	
2016	Troféu APCA	Best Director	Luiz Fernando Carvalho	Nominated	
2016	Troféu APCA	Best Actor	Chico Diaz	Nominated	
2016	Troféu APCA	Best Actor	Rodrigo Santoro	Nominated	
2016	Troféu APCA	Best Actress	Fabíula Nascimento	Nominated	
2016	Troféu APCA	Best Actress	Lucy Alves	Nominated	
2016	Troféu APCA	Best Actress	Selma Egrei	Won	
2016	Troféu APCA	Grande Prêmio da Crítica	Domingos Montagner	Won (posthumously)	
2016	Melhores do Ano de 2016	Best Telenovela Actress	Camila Pitanga	Won	
2016	Melhores do Ano de 2016	Best Supporting Actress	Dira Paes	Nominated	
2016	Melhores do Ano de 2016	Best Supporting Actress	Gabriel Leonel	Won	
2016	Melhores do Ano de 2016	Most Promising Actress	Giullia Buscacio	Nominated	
2016	Melhores do Ano de 2016	Most Promising Actress	Lucy Alves	Won	
2016	Melhores do Ano de 2016	Most Promising Actor	Lucas Veloso	Nominated	
2016	Melhores do Ano de 2016	Character of the Year	Antônio Fagundes - Afrânio	Nominated	
2016	Melhores do Ano de 2016	Character of the Year	Selma Egrei - Encarnação	Nominated	
2016	Prêmio Quem de Televisão	Best Actor	Antônio Fagundes	Nominated	
2016	Prêmio Quem de Televisão	Best Actor	Domingos Montagner	Won (posthumously)	
2016	Prêmio Quem de Televisão	Best Actor	Rodrigo Santoro	Nominated	
2016	Prêmio Quem de Televisão	Best Supporting Actress	Selma Egrei	Nominated	
2016	Prêmio Quem de Televisão	Best Supporting Actor	Chico Diaz	Nominated	
2016	Prêmio Quem de Televisão	Best Supporting Actor	Marcelo Serrado	Nominated	
2016	Prêmio Quem de Televisão	Most Promising Actress	Giullia Buscacio	Nominated	
2016	Prêmio Quem de Televisão	Most Promising Actress	Lucy Alves	Won	
2016	Prêmio Brasileiro do Ano	Brazilian of the Year in Culture	Benedito Ruy Barbosa	Won	
2017	45th International Emmy Awards	Best Telenovela	Benedito Ruy Barbosa	Nominated	
2017	Prêmio Bravo! de Cultura	Artist of the Year	Luiz Fernando Carvalho	Won	

Preceded by A Regra do Jogo (2015)	Velho Chico (2016)	Succeeded by A Lei do Amor (2016)
