= Baraúna, Rio Grande do Norte =

Municipality in Rio Grande do Norte, Brazil

Coordinates: 6°38′34″S 36°15′14″W

Baraúna
- Municipality
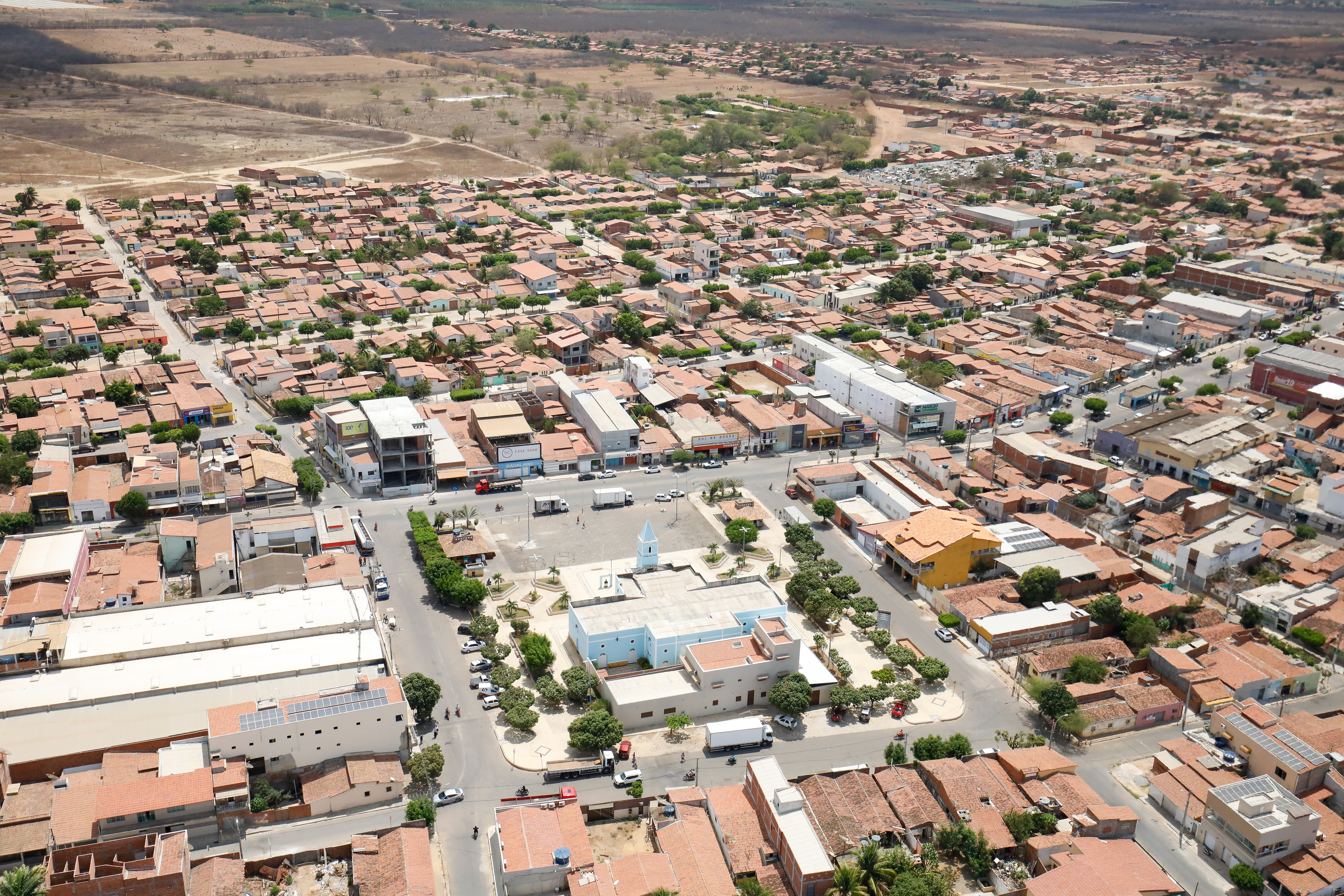

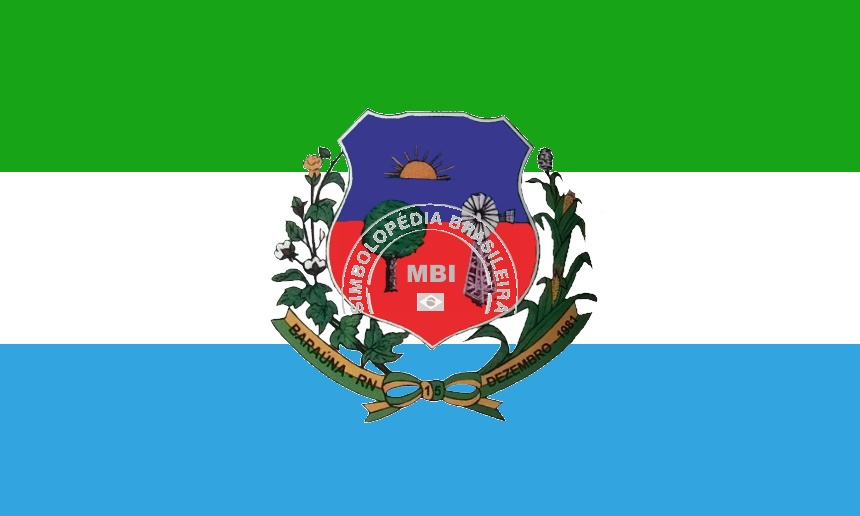
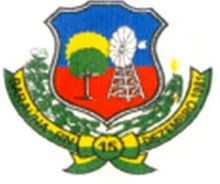
- Flag Coat of arms
- Interactive map of Baraúna
- Country: Brazil
- Region: South
- State: Rio Grande do Norte
- Mesoregion: Mossoró

Population (2022)
  - Total: 26,913
- Time zone: UTC -3

Baraúna is a municipality in the state of Rio Grande do Norte in the Northeast Region of Brazil. With an area of 825.681 square kilometers (318.797 sq mi), of which 9.0255 square kilometres (3.4848 sq mi) is urban, it is located 279 km from Natal, the state capital, and 1,639 km from Brasília, the federal capital. Its population in the 2022 demographic census was 26,913 inhabitants, according to the Brazilian Institute of Geography and Statistics (IBGE), ranking as the 21rd most populous municipality in the state of Rio Grande do Norte.

== Geography ==
The territory of Baraúna covers 825.681 square kilometers (318.797 sq mi), of which 9.0255 square kilometres (3.4848 sq mi) constitutes the urban area. It sits at an average altitude of 94 meters above sea level. Baraúna borders these municipalities: to the north, Aracati; to the south, Governador Dix-Sept Rosado; to the east, Mossoró; and to the west, Quixeré and Jaguaruana. The city is located 279 km from the state capital Natal, and 1,639 km from the federal capital Brasília.

Under the territorial division established in 2017 by the Brazilian Institute of Geography and Statistics (IBGE), the municipality belongs to the immediate geographical region of Mossoró, within the intermediate region of Mossoró. Previously, under the microregion and mesoregion divisions, it was part of the microregion of Mossoró in the mesoregion of Oeste Potiguar.

== Demographics ==
In the 2022 census, the municipality had a population of 26,913 inhabitants and ranked only 21st in the state that year (out of 167 municipalities), with 50.2% male and 49.8% female, resulting in a sex ratio of 100.8 (10,080 men for every 10,000 women), compared to 24,182 inhabitants in the 2010 census (62.9% living in the urban area), when it held the 21st state position. Between the 2010 and 2022 censuses, the population of Baraúna changed at an annual geometric growth rate of 0.9%. Regarding age group in the 2022 census, 70.43% of the inhabitants were between 15 and 64 years old, 21.9% were under fifteen, and 7.68% were 65 or older. The population density in 2022 was 32.59 inhabitants per square kilometer, with an average of 3.03 inhabitants per household.

The municipality's Human Development Index (HDI-M) is considered medium, according to data from the United Nations Development Programme. According to the 2010 report published in 2013, its value was 0.574, ranking seventh in the state and 2,386th nationally (out of 5,565 municipalities), and the Gini coefficient rose from 0.38 in 2003 to 0.43 in 2010. Considering only the longevity index, its value is 0.756, the income index is 0.562, and the education index is 0.446.

== See also ==
- List of municipalities in Rio Grande do Norte
