= De Onde Eu Te Vejo =

2016 film directed by Luiz Villaça

- Directed by: Luiz Villaça
- Written by: Rafael Gomes; Leonardo Moreira
- Produced by: Paula Cosenza; Denise Gomes
- Starring: Denise Fraga; Domingos Montagner; Manoela Aliperti
- Cinematography: Alexandre Ermel
- Edited by: Marcola Marinho
- Music by: Dimi Kireeff
- Distributed by: Warner Bros. Pictures
- Release date: 2016
- Country: Brazil

De Onde Eu Te Vejo ("From Where I See You") is a 2016 Brazilian comedy film, directed by Luiz Villaça, starring Denise Fraga, Domingos Montagner, Manoela Aliperti, Juca de Oliveira and Laura Cardoso. The screenplay was written by Leonardo Moreira and Rafael Gomes. Produced by Bossa Nova Films and Warner Bros., it was released by the latter on April 7, 2016.

== Plot ==
The film tells the story of a couple settling for divorce after 20 years of marriage and trying to adapt to a new reality when the ex-husband starts dwelling across the street from the old family home.

== Cast ==
- Denise Fraga as Ana Lúcia
- Domingos Montagner as Fábio
- Manoela Aliperti as Manuela
- Fúlvio Stefanini as Hélio
