= Grávido =

Studio album by Gonzaguinha
- Released: 1984
- Genre: MPB, samba
- Length: 40:54
- Label: EMI
- Producer: Renato Corrêa

Grávido is a 1984 album by the Brazilian composer and singer Luiz Gonzaga Jr., better known as Gonzaguinha. It is considered an album of the maturity period of the artist and counts on the arrangements of Jota Moraes. It includes the hits "Lindo lago do amor" and "Rosa povo".

== Track listing ==
All tracks are written by Luiz Gonzaga Jr..

No.	Title	Length
1.	"Lindo lago do amor"	4:11
2.	"Grávido"	3:52
3.	"Nem o pobre nem o rei"	4:23
4.	"Rosa povo"	3:29
5.	"Cabeça"	4:17
6.	"Meninos eu vi (Gravidez)"	3:38
7.	"Days after that day"	3:08
8.	"Sonhos brasis"	3:13
9.	"Nunca pare de sonhar (Sementes do amanhã)"	3:49
10.	"Lindo lago do amor"	6:49

== Personnel ==
- Gonzaguinha: vocals and acoustic guitar (in "Lindo lago do amor" and "Days after that day").
- Jota Moraes: arrangement (except in "Sonhos brasis")
- Pascoal Meirelles: arrangement (in "Nem o pobre nem o rei")
- Wagner Tiso: arrangement (in "Sonhos brasis")
