= Juliana Schalch =

Brazilian actress (born 1985)

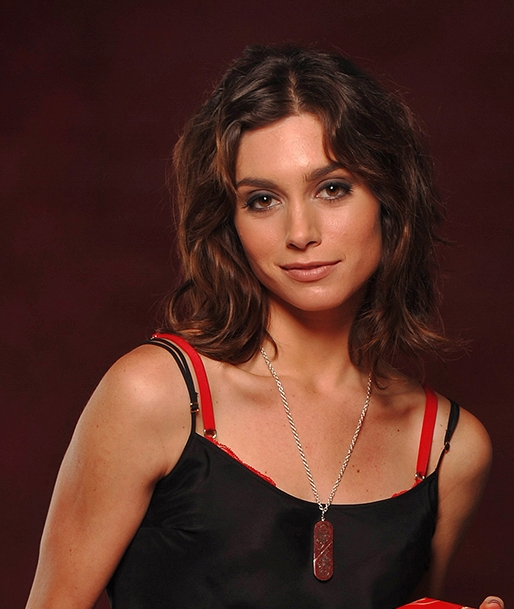
- Schalch in 2011
- Born: Juliana Santi Schalch; April 23, 1985 (age 41); São Paulo, Brazil
- Occupation: Actress
- Years active: 2004–present

Juliana Santi Schalch (born April 23, 1985) is a Brazilian actress who has appeared in several films and telenovelas.

== Biography ==
She was born in São Paulo, and graduated in Performing Arts in 2006, at the Oficina de Atores Nilton Travesso. Her great-grandfather was a native of Switzerland. She is also a descendant of Portuguese and Italian immigrants.

== Career ==
Juliana Schalch's first work was in the film Formigamento, in 2004, and in 2007 she appeared in the film Dorian. Her first work in a telenovela, played Juliana Galvão in 2008, Rede Globo's telenovela Três Irmãs. She played the girlfriend of Lt. Col. Nascimento's son in the 2010 film Elite Squad: The Enemy Within, then in 2011 she was cast as Lara Vilanova in the telenovela Morde & Assopra. The actress in the same year played Camila in the 2011 film Os 3. Juliana Schalch plays the First Daughter of the President of Brazil in the 2012 miniseries O Brado Retumbante. Her character, named Marta Ventura, suffers bipolar disorder. She has also appeared in the same year in the film Os Penetras. Juliana Schalch was cast to play one of the lead roles, a call girl named Luna, in the 2013 HBO television series O Negócio.

== Filmography ==
=== Television ===
Year	Title	Role
2008	Três Irmãs	Juliana Galvão
2010	Status Solteira	Joana
2010	Alice	Tânia
2011	Morde & Assopra	Lara Vilanova
2012	O Brado Retumbante	Marta Ventura
2013	O Negócio	Luna
2014	(Des)encontros	Júlia
2014	A Teia	Suzane
2017	Sem Volta	Suzane
2019	Jezabel	Temina
2021	Gênesis	Haviva
2021	Um Lugar ao Sol	Hanna
2021	Anjo Loiro com Sangue no Cabelo	Sônia Lins
2023	A Infância de Romeu e Julieta	Mariana Campos Matos
2023	Vicky e a Musa	Terpsichore

=== Cinema ===
Year	Title	Role
2004	Formigamento	
2007	Dorian	Helena
2010	Elite Squad: The Enemy Within	Júlia
2011	Os 3	Camila
2011	E ai, comeu?	Alana Fragoso
2012	Os Penetras	
2017	Polícia Federal: A Lei É para Todos	Rosângela Moro
