= Domingos Montagner =

Brazilian actor, playwright and entrepreneur

- Born: Domingos Montagner Filho; 26 February 1962; São Paulo, São Paulo, Brazil
- Died: 15 September 2016 (aged 54); Canindé de São Francisco, Sergipe, Brazil
- Resting place: Quarta Parada Cemetery, São Paulo
- Occupations: Actor, producer, clown
- Years active: 1997–2016
- Spouse: Luciana Lima (m. 2002)
- Children: 3

Domingos Montagner Filho (26 February 1962 – 15 September 2016) was a Brazilian actor, playwright and entrepreneur. He began his career in theaters and circuses, through the course of interpretation of Myriam Muniz. In 1997, Montagner formed La Mínima group, alongside Fernando Sampaio, and won the Shell Award for Best Actor. In 2003, he founded the Zanni Circus, of which he was artistic director.

He began his career on TV, three years later, but gained national notoriety after portraying Captain Herculano in the soap opera Cordel Encantado (2011), Mundo in Joia Rara (2013), and Miguel in Sete Vidas (2015). In cinema, he participated in the feature film Gonzaga: de Pai pra Filho (2012). He became "one of Brazil's most loved TV actors."

In 2016, Montagner portrayed Santo dos Anjos, the protagonist of the soap opera Velho Chico, broadcast by Rede Globo, his last work. In a break between filming, he drowned while swimming in the São Francisco River, the main setting of the aforementioned television drama.

== Biography and career ==
Montagner was born in São Paulo's neighborhood of Tatuapé in a family of Italian Brazilians. He began working at sixteen in the bar of his parents in Tatuapé, where he worked as an office boy and archivist in an engineering company. Slender, at 6 ft 3 in (1.90 m) tall, he became an athlete of the Sport Club Corinthians Paulista playing handball.

Montagner was a second lieutenant in the Brazilian Army and after leaving military service graduated in physical education, teaching in the 1980s in public and private schools in São Paulo. It was nearly eleven years later when he began his artistic career at 27.

He was a Roman Catholic.

His artistic career began in the circus, in his theater company La Mínima in 1980. In 1990, Montagner joined the theater as a clown.

Montagner became a star of Brazilian television despite the fact that his first major television role did not come until he was 46. His first television series was Cordel Encantado of Rede Globo. He made a few appearances on the television shows Força-Tarefa and A Cura. He also participated in the show Divã, portraying Carlos Alencar, the lover of the protagonist Mercedes, played by actress Lília Cabral. In 2012, he played the role of President Paulo Ventura in the miniseries O Brado Retumbante. In the same year, he played in Salve Jorge the Turkish tour guide Zyah, who falls in love with Bianca, Cléo Pires' character. In 2013, he played the role of the activist Mundo in Joia Rara.

In 2015, he was cast as the protagonist of Sete Vidas, in the role of Miguel, a man who discovers that he has seven children, after being a sperm donor. His last performance was in 2016 in the soap opera Velho Chico, interpreting the character Santo dos Anjos.

== Personal life ==
Married since 2002 to Luciana Lima, administrative producer of La Mínima group, Montagner claimed that his wife would encourage him the most. In 2013, the family moved to Rio de Janeiro, but settled in Embu das Artes, in Greater São Paulo, about 25 kilometres (16 miles) from the capital, in a quiet fenced residential condominium with their three sons.

== Death ==
On 15 September 2016, during the lunch break of the filming for Velho Chico, Montagner jumped into the São Francisco River, in the city of Canindé de São Francisco, state of Sergipe, but did not return to the mainland. Actress Camila Pitanga was swimming with Montagner and saw him disappearing into the water, dragged by a strong current. She screamed for help, being initially mistaken as if she was filming a scene. After realizing that the actress was screaming out of panic, the crew immediately stood up to check what was happening, as a boat came to rescue her. Montagner went missing for four hours until his body was found submerged and lifeless. According to reports the Legal Medical Institute (IML) of Sergipe, the result of the autopsy performed Montagner's body pointed out that the actor died of mechanical asphyxia by drowning.

The Brazilian version of online magazine The Intercept speculated that the strong currents where the actor drowned were caused by the hydroelectric dam, the Xingó Dam, upstream. The dam lies approximately two kilometers upstream, and the flow rate allowed through the dam can affect currents.

At the time of his death, the filming of Velho Chico was just a few days from completion. However, climactic scenes for the finale, in which Montagner was the main character, hadn't been filmed yet. Production decided to complete the job as scheduled. Scenes in which Montagner's character, Santo, would have appeared would be shot from the character's point of view. Thus, Santo would be present in the scene, but would not be seen.

Weeks prior to the casualty, Rede Globo aired a scene where Santo would be saved by Indians, who found him unconscious floating on the São Francisco River, having been shot by his enemy. The river was the same where the actor lost his life.

== Filmography ==
=== Films ===
Year	Title	Role	Notes
2009	Paredes Nuas		
2012	A Noite dos Palhaços Mudos	Clown	Short
2012	Gonzaga – de Pai pra Filho	Colonel Raimundo	
2014	The Great Victory	Cesar Trombini	
2014	Tarja Branca – A Revolução que Faltava		
2015	Através da Sombra	Afonso	
2016	De Onde Eu Te Vejo	Fabio	
2016	Vidas Partidas	Raul	
2016	Um Namorado Para Minha Mulher	Corvo	
2017	Bingo: The King of the Mornings	Clown Aparício	

=== Television ===
Year	Title	Role	Notes
2007-2008	Mothern	João	
2010	Força-Tarefa	Corporal Moacyr	
2010	A Cura	Ezequiel's father	
2011	Divã	Carlos Alencar	
2011	Cordel Encantado	Captain Herculano Araújo	
2012	O Brado Retumbante	Paulo Ventura	
2012	Salve Jorge	Zyah	
2012	Gonzaga — de Pai pra Filho	Colonel Raimundo	
2013	Joia Rara	Raimundo Fonseca (Mundo)	
2015	Sete Vidas	João Miguel Oliveira Sanches	
2015	Romance Policial – Espinosa	Espinosa	
2016	Velho Chico	Santo dos Anjos	(final appearance)

=== Theatre ===
Year	Title
2001	À La Carte
2003	Piratas do Tietê, O Filme
2006	Feia – Uma comédia circense
2007	Reprise
2008	A Noite dos Palhaços Mudos
2012–2016	Mistero Buffo

== Awards and nominations ==
Year	Award	Category	Work	Result	Ref.
2011	Prêmio Extra de Televisão	Male Revelation	Cordel Encantado	Nominated	
2011	Prêmio Globo de Melhores do Ano	Best Revelation Actor	Cordel Encantado	Won	
2011	Prêmio Quem de Televisão	Best Supporting Actor	Cordel Encantado	Nominated	
2012	Prêmio Contigo! de TV	TV Revelation	Cordel Encantado	Won	
2013	Prêmio Contigo! de TV	Best Actor of Series or Miniseries	O Brado Retumbante	Won	
2013	Prêmio Quem de Televisão	Best Actor	Salve Jorge	Nominated	
2015	Troféu APCA	Best Actor	Sete Vidas	Nominated	
2016	Prêmio Extra de Televisão	Best Actor	Velho Chico	Won (posthumously)	
