= Valter Santos =

Brazilian actor

- Born: Valter Borges dos Santos; 16 October 1954; Rio de Janeiro, Brazil
- Died: 24 December 2013 (aged 59); São Paulo, Brazil
- Occupation: Actor
- Years active: 1975–2013

Valter Borges dos Santos (16 October 1954 – 24 December 2013) was a Brazilian actor, best known for his work in television, specifically his role as the slave overseer Bruno in the 1986 TV drama serie Sinhá Moça (Little Missy) and as Colonel Werneck in the TV miniseries O Brado Retumbante (2012).

== Career ==
Santos studied at the National Conservatory Theatre in Rio de Janeiro. Acted in several plays, such as "Hair" and "The Week" for which he was awarded by APCA. He was also present in TV series like " O Fim do Mundo ", " O Salvador da Pátria ", " O Outro ", "Sinha Girl", "Roque Santeiro" (1975 and 1985) and in mini series like " Amazônia - De Galvez a Chico Mendes ", "Abolição", " República ", and "Grande Sertão Veredas". He also made voiceovers for the Brazilian version of "Knights of the Zodiac" as Jamian Crow and Camus of Aquarius. He appeared in film movies like " Deixa, Amorzinho...Deixa " (1975), " Mulheres do Cais" (1979) and " O Menino da Porteira " (2009). His last major role was as Colonel Werneck in 2012, before he directed and eventually narrated episodes of National Geographic Society in 2013 in Portuguese.

== Death ==
Valter Santos died on 24 December 2013, of a sudden heart attack.

== Work ==
- 1975: Roque Santeiro (TV Series) .... Luizão
- 1975: Deixa, Amorzinho...Deixa
- 1977: Um Sol Maior (TV Series) .... Sala (Salatiel Jr.)
- 1978: O Direito de Nascer (TV Series) .... priest
- 1978: Aritana (TV Series) .... Ramalho
- 1978: João Brasileiro, o Bom Baiano (TV Series) .... Glauco
- 1979: Mulheres do Cais .... Dante
- 1980: Cavalo Amarelo (TV Series) .... Alemão
- 1981: Rosa Baiana (TV Series)
- 1982: Pic Nic Classe C (TV Series) .... Mauro
- 1982: Destino (TV Series) .... Seu Apolônio
- 1982: A Leoa (TV Series) .... Hugo
- 1983: A Ponte do Amor (TV Series)
- 1985: Roque Santeiro (TV Series) .... gunman
- 1985: Grande Sertão: Veredas (TV Mini-Series) .... Alaripe
- 1986: Sinhá Moça (TV Series) .... overseer Bruno
- 1987: O Outro (TV Series) .... Melo Mendonça
- 1988: Abolição (TV Mini-Series) .... José do Patrocínio
- 1989: O Salvador da Pátria (TV Series) .... Jaime
- 1989: República (TV Mini-Series) .... José do Patrocínio
- 1990: Pantanal (TV Series) .... Matador
- 1994: 74.5 - Uma Onda no Ar (TV Series) .... Stallone
- 1994: Knights of the Zodiac (TV Series) .... Jamian de Corvo and Camus de Aquário
- 1996: O Fim do Mundo (TV Series) .... Juvenal
- 1997: Mandacaru (TV Series) .... Avelós
- 2000: Marcas da Paixão (TV Series) .... Valtinho
- 2001: Amor e Ódio (TV Series) .... Ezequiel
- 2006: Cidadão Brasileiro (TV Series) .... Décio Leão
- 2007: Amazônia - De Galvez a Chico Mendes (TV Series) .... Nilo
- 2009: O Menino da Porteira .... João Só
- 2010: Força-Tarefa (TV Series) .... Colonel Lucena
- 2012: O Brado Retumbante (TV Mini-Series) .... Colonel Werneck
- 2014: ABCs of Death 2 .... (segment "J") (final film role)
