= O Negócio =

Brazilian drama television series

- Genre: Drama
- Created by: Luca Paiva Mello; Rodrigo Castilho
- Starring: Rafaela Mandelli; Juliana Schalch; Michelle Batista; Aline Jones; Guilherme Weber; Gabriel Godoy; Eduardo Semerjian
- Country of origin: Brazil
- Original language: Portuguese
- No. of seasons: 4
- No. of episodes: 51

Production
- Executive producer: Tereza Gonzalez
- Production locations: São Paulo, Brazil
- Production companies: Mixer; HBO Latin America

Original release
- Network: HBO Brasil; HBO Latin America
- Release: 18 August 2013 – 6 March 2018

O Negócio (transl. The business) is a Brazilian drama television series created by Luca Paiva Mello and Rodrigo Castilho, and written by Fabio Danesi, Camila Raffanti and Alexandre Soares Silva. It was produced by HBO Latin America in partnership with Mixer.

The series follows the lives of Karin, Luna, Magali and Mia, high-class call girls who stand out in the market. They have put in practice various marketing strategies that they have learned and, with this, not only conquered space in the market but also created the successful company "Oceano Azul".

== Cast and characters ==
=== Main cast ===
Actor	Character	Season			
Actor	Character	1 (2013)	2 (2014)	3 (2016)	4 (2018)
Rafaela Mandelli	Joana Segall / Karin				
Juliana Schalch	Maria Clara de Andrade / Luna				
Michelle Batista	Magali Becker				
Guilherme Weber	Ariel				
Gabriel Godoy	Oscar				
Eduardo Semerjian	César				
Johnnas Oliva	Yuri				
João Gabriel Vasconcellos	Augusto				
Kauê Telloli	Tomás Zanini				
Aline Jones	Mia				
João Côrtes	Eric				

=== Recurring cast ===
Actor	Character	Season			
Actor	Character	1 (2013)	2 (2014)	3 (2016)	4 (2018)
Gabriela Cerqueira	Sabrina				
Cris Bonna	Isabel de Andrade				
Tony Mastaler	Francisco de Andrade				
Pedro Inoue	Fred de Andrade				
Einat Falbel	Sonia Lemos				
Isabel Wilker	Livia				
Jessica Drago	Jessica				
Renata Fasanella	Renata				
Joaquim Guedes	Xavier				

== Release ==
=== Broadcast ===
O Négocio (aka El Negocio and The Business) began airing on 18 August 2013, on HBO Brasil and HBO Latin America. In September 2013, the series was renewed for its second season, which debuted on 24 August 2014. On 27 April 2015, the third season was announced. The premiere of the third season was confirmed for 24 April 2016. On 14 November 2016, it was officially announced the fourth and final season of O Negócio, which debuted on 18 March 2018. Seasons 1, 2 and 3 have 13 episodes and season 4 has 12 episodes.

In Portugal, the series began airing on 19 March 2018 on SIC Radical.

== Reception ==
=== Critical response ===
The journalist André Santana from television critic website Observatório da televisão, stated "O Negócio was able to reinvent itself every season, without losing sight of its initial story line... [and] the series was successful to explore its main theme in the prism of humor." He noted that "even with so many qualities, O Negócio did not escape a depletion of the formula. Therefore, the decision to finish the series at the fourth season was quite happy.", and concluded that "The story was closed at the right time, showing that the Brazilian series production on pay TV has already raised to high levels, and that the Brazilian Teledramaturgy, in general, has many paths to follow."

BuzzFeed published a list of their 26 non-American favorite TV shows and O Négocio was the only Brazilian production listed.
