= O Brado Retumbante =

Brazilian TV miniseries

O Brado Retumbante (English: Next in Line) is a Brazilian miniseries produced by Rede Globo and directed by Ricardo Waddington. It was originally broadcast from 17–27 January 2012, in eight episodes.

The miniseries uses a documentary tone and movie-like photography to narrate the dilemma of an honest man who becomes president and undergoes the challenge of governing the country, while trying to control his personal weaknesses. It was nominated for an International Emmy Award in 2013.

== Plot ==
The miniseries depicts the political drama and conflict experienced by a man who reaches the nation's highest position, Paulo Ventura (Domingos Montagner). Paulo is an exception in Brazilian public life: an honest politician. He exerts all his energy in his fight against corruption. Due to a scheme from the political opposition and his enemies, he is elected President of the Chamber of Deputies to serve as a lame duck until the next election.

By a twist of fate, both the current president and vice-president suffer fatal accidents and, being the first in the line of succession, Ventura is to assume command of the country for the remaining 15-month term. Ventura's new position requires reconciliation with Antonia (Maria Fernanda Cândido), his ex-wife, with whom he had a daughter, Marta (Juliana Schalch), and a trans daughter, Júlio/Julie (Murilo Armacollo). Maria agrees to be first lady on the condition that she is not publicly exposed to the infidelity of troubled marriage. She is also struggling to reconcile with Júlio/Julie, who is forced to leave their home.

Júlio/Julie is a trans woman who has cut ties with her father and lives in the United States, but later returns to Brazil for sex reassignment surgery. Paulo's adversaries, upon learning of his opposition to the procedure, seize the opportunity to tag him as homophobic.

However, Paulo's real trouble lies with the corrupt Floriano Pedreira (José Wilker). Helped by Senator Nicodemo Cabral (Luiz Carlos Miele), a stone-cold articulator, Floriano attempts to defeat the anti-corruption measures and to expose Ventura's personal shortcomings.

A dossier on supposedly illicit funds leads to an impeachment process at the same time that the press reveals the first lady's love affair with an Argentine writer. Dejected, the president renounces his position, yielding his office to Floriano. However, investigations reveal that the dossier had been forged with the help of Tony Abrahão (Leopoldo Pacheco), a businessman who is invested in Senator Nicodemo's political climb. Though he was acquitted, Ventura decides to end his political mission and refuses to participate in another election, despite the pressure from his campaign manager, Fernanda Dummont (Mariana Lima).

On his deathbed, a former president, Jorge Moura (Hugo Carvana), asks Ventura to accept the sacrifice for the good of the country. Paulo reconsiders his decision and returns to the campaign. During Paulo's campaign trail, he confronts Floriano Pedreira in a final heated debate, broadcast live to the entire country.

== Characters ==
- Domingos Montagner portrays Paulo Alberto Ventura, the miniseries' protagonist. Paulo is a politician who becomes president.
- Maria Fernanda Candido portrays Maria Antonia Ventura, Paulo's ex-wife and mother to Marta and Julio. Maria is a teacher with a doctorate degree in Brazilian history.
- Juliana Schalch portrays Marta Arruda Ventura, Paulo and Maria's daughter.
- Murilo Armacollo portrays Júlio/Julie, Paulo's son who is transitioning to female.
- Jose Wilker portrays Floriano Pedreira. Floriano is the corrupt Minister of Justice, and later President of the National Congress.
- Luiz Carlos Miele portrays Nicodemo Cabral, a senator. Nicodemo works with Floriano to expose Paulo's shortcomings.
- Leopoldo Pacheco portrays Tony Abrahão, a businessman. Tony works with Floriano to forge the dossier that attempts to impeach Paulo.
- Mariana Lima portrays Fernanda Fummont, Paulo's campaign manager.
- Hugo Carvana portrays Jorge Moura, a former president of Brazil.

== Cast ==
Actor	Character
Domingos Montagner	Paulo Alberto Ventura
Maria Fernanda Cândido	Maria Antonia Ventura
José Wilker	Floriano Pedreira
Otávio Augusto	Benjamin "Beijo" Ventura
Leopoldo Pacheco	Tony Abrahão
Hugo Carvana	Jorge Mourão
Mariana Lima	Fernanda Dummont
Juliana Schalch	Marta Arruda Ventura
Alinne Rosa	Alessandra Ferrão
Cacá Carvalho	Saulo Aires Saldanha (Saldanha)
Murilo Armacollo	Júlio Arruda Ventura (Julie Arruda Ventura)
Luiz Carlos Miele	Nicodemo Cabral, "O Senador"
Maria do Carmo Soares	Julieta Ventura
Cristine Peron	Telma
Sandra Corveloni	Neide Batalha
Valter Santos	Cel. Otávio Werneck
Cris Nicolotti	Lúcia Wolf
Paulo Ivo	Alcides Barata
Ida Celina	Regina
Marina Elali	Fátima
Jui Huang	Otacílio Júnior

== Episodes ==
- "O Presidente Acidental" (17 January 2012)
- "O Público e o Privado" (18 January 2012)
- "O Sucessor" (19 January 2012)
- "O Brado da Primeira-Dama" (20 January 2012)
- "Fronteiras" (24 January 2012)
- "Fora Ventura!" - part 1 (25 January 2012)
- "Fora Ventura!" - part 2 (26 January 2012)
- "O Ex-Presidente" (27 January 2012)
