= Barauna Kalan =

- village
- Location in Uttar Pradesh, India Barauna Kalan (Uttar Pradesh)
- Coordinates: 26.847889°N 79.363418°E
- Country: India
- State: Uttar Pradesh
- District: Auraiya

Languages
  - Official: Hindi
- Time zone: UTC+5:30 (IST)
- Vehicle registration: UP-
- Coastline: 0 kilometres (0 mi)

Barauna Kalan is a town in Auraiya district in the India state of Uttar Pradesh.

== History ==
Barauna Kalan lies in Lat. 26°53' N. and Long. 79°25' E. about 67 km. from Etawah and 16 km. from Bidhuna. It is said to have been founded about 325 years ago by Harchand Rai, a Kanyakubja Brahmin chieftain.
