= Quixeré =

Municipality in Ceará, Brazil

Coordinates: 5°05′S 37°59′W

- Municipality
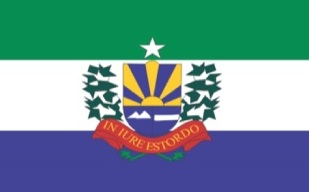
- Flag
- Interactive map of Quixeré
- Country: Brazil
- Region: Nordeste
- State: Ceará
- Mesoregion: Jaguaribe

Population (2020)
  - Total: 22,293
- Time zone: UTC−3 (BRT)

Quixeré is a municipality in the state of Ceará in the Northeast region of Brazil.

== See also ==
- List of municipalities in Ceará
