= Baraúna, Paraíba =

Coordinates: 6°38′34″S 36°15′14″W

Baraúna
- Municipality
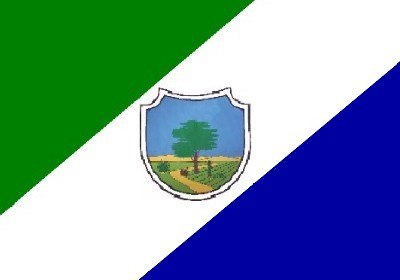
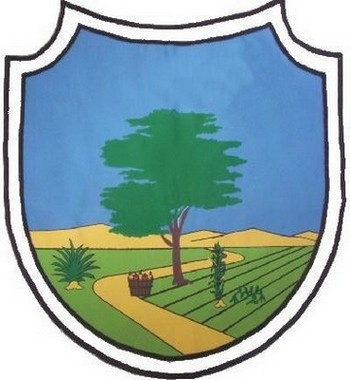
- Flag Coat of arms
- Interactive map of Baraúna
- Country: Brazil
- Region: South
- State: Paraíba
- Mesoregion: Boborema

Population (2020)
  - Total: 4,964
- Time zone: UTC−3 (BRT)

Baraúna is a municipality in the state of Paraíba in the Northeast Region of Brazil.

== See also ==
- List of municipalities in Paraíba
