= Jaguaruana =

Municipality in Ceará, Brazil

Coordinates: 4°50′S 37°47′W

- Municipality
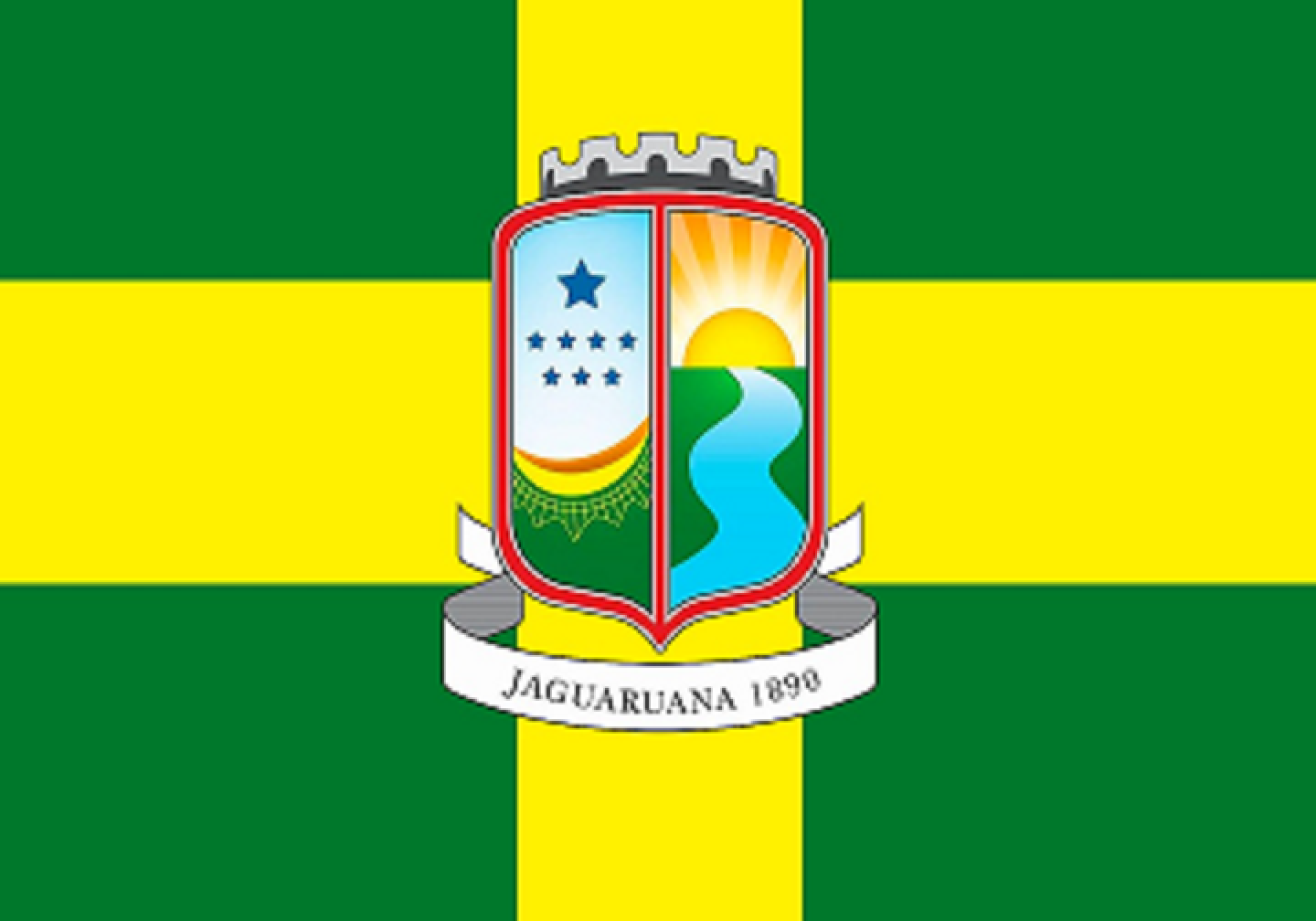
- Flag Coat of arms
- Interactive map of Jaguaruana
- Country: Brazil
- Region: Nordeste
- State: Ceará
- Mesoregion: Jaguaribe

Population (2020)
  - Total: 33,834
- Time zone: UTC−3 (BRT)

Jaguaruana is a municipality in the state of Ceará in the Northeast region of Brazil.

== Climate ==
Climate data for Jaguaruana (1991–2020)
Month	Jan	Feb	Mar	Apr	May	Jun	Jul	Aug	Sep	Oct	Nov	Dec	Year
Mean daily maximum °C (°F)	34.0 (93.2)	33.6 (92.5)	32.9 (91.2)	32.3 (90.1)	32.5 (90.5)	32.6 (90.7)	33.1 (91.6)	34.3 (93.7)	35.0 (95.0)	35.0 (95.0)	34.7 (94.5)	34.6 (94.3)	33.7 (92.7)
Daily mean °C (°F)	28.2 (82.8)	28.0 (82.4)	27.7 (81.9)	27.4 (81.3)	27.3 (81.1)	26.9 (80.4)	26.8 (80.2)	27.2 (81.0)	27.8 (82.0)	28.2 (82.8)	28.3 (82.9)	28.4 (83.1)	27.7 (81.9)
Mean daily minimum °C (°F)	24.0 (75.2)	23.9 (75.0)	24.0 (75.2)	23.8 (74.8)	23.4 (74.1)	22.6 (72.7)	22.0 (71.6)	21.7 (71.1)	22.3 (72.1)	23.0 (73.4)	23.5 (74.3)	23.9 (75.0)	23.2 (73.8)
Average precipitation mm (inches)	74.3 (2.93)	98.3 (3.87)	167.6 (6.60)	176.8 (6.96)	88.5 (3.48)	40.5 (1.59)	23.7 (0.93)	5.8 (0.23)	2.0 (0.08)	2.7 (0.11)	1.6 (0.06)	9.4 (0.37)	691.2 (27.21)
Source: Instituto Nacional de Meteorologia

== See also ==
- List of municipalities in Ceará
