= Renascença =

Coordinates: 26°09′28″S 52°58′08″W

- Municipality
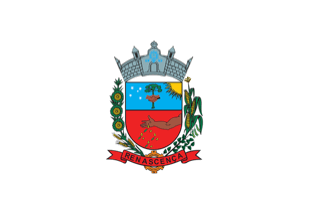
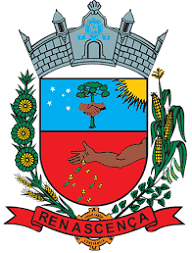
- Flag Coat of arms
- Interactive map of Renascença
- Country: Brazil
- Region: Southern
- State: Paraná
- Mesoregion: Sudoeste Paranaense

Population (2020)
  - Total: 6,787
- Time zone: UTC−3 (BRT)

Renascença is a municipality in the state of Paraná in the Southern Region of Brazil.

== See also ==
- List of municipalities in Paraná
