= Joanna (singer) =

Brazilian singer

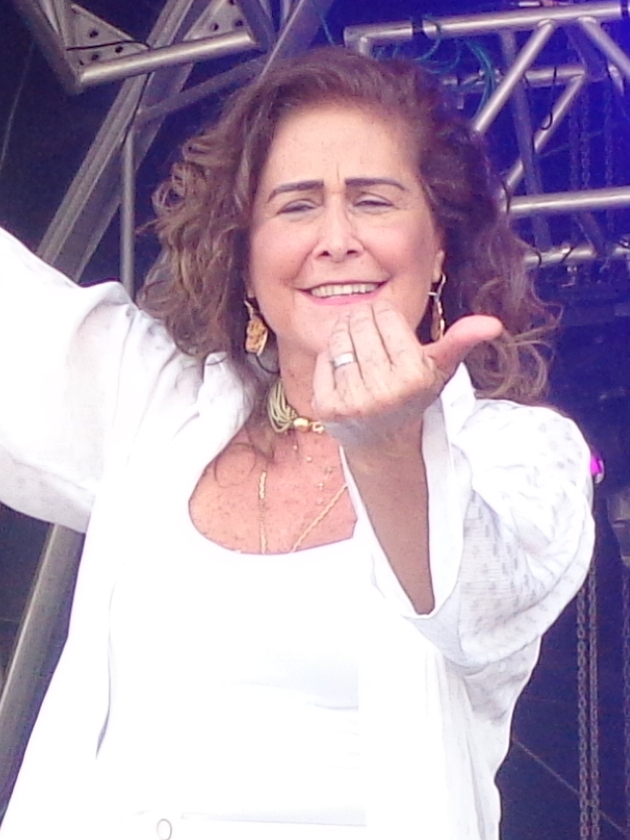
- Joanna

Background information
- Born: Maria de Fátima Gomes Nogueira; 27 January 1957 (age 69); Rio de Janeiro, Brazil
- Occupation: Singer

Maria de Fátima Gomes Nogueira (born Rio de Janeiro, 27 January 1957), better known as Joanna, is a Brazilian singer.

== Discography ==
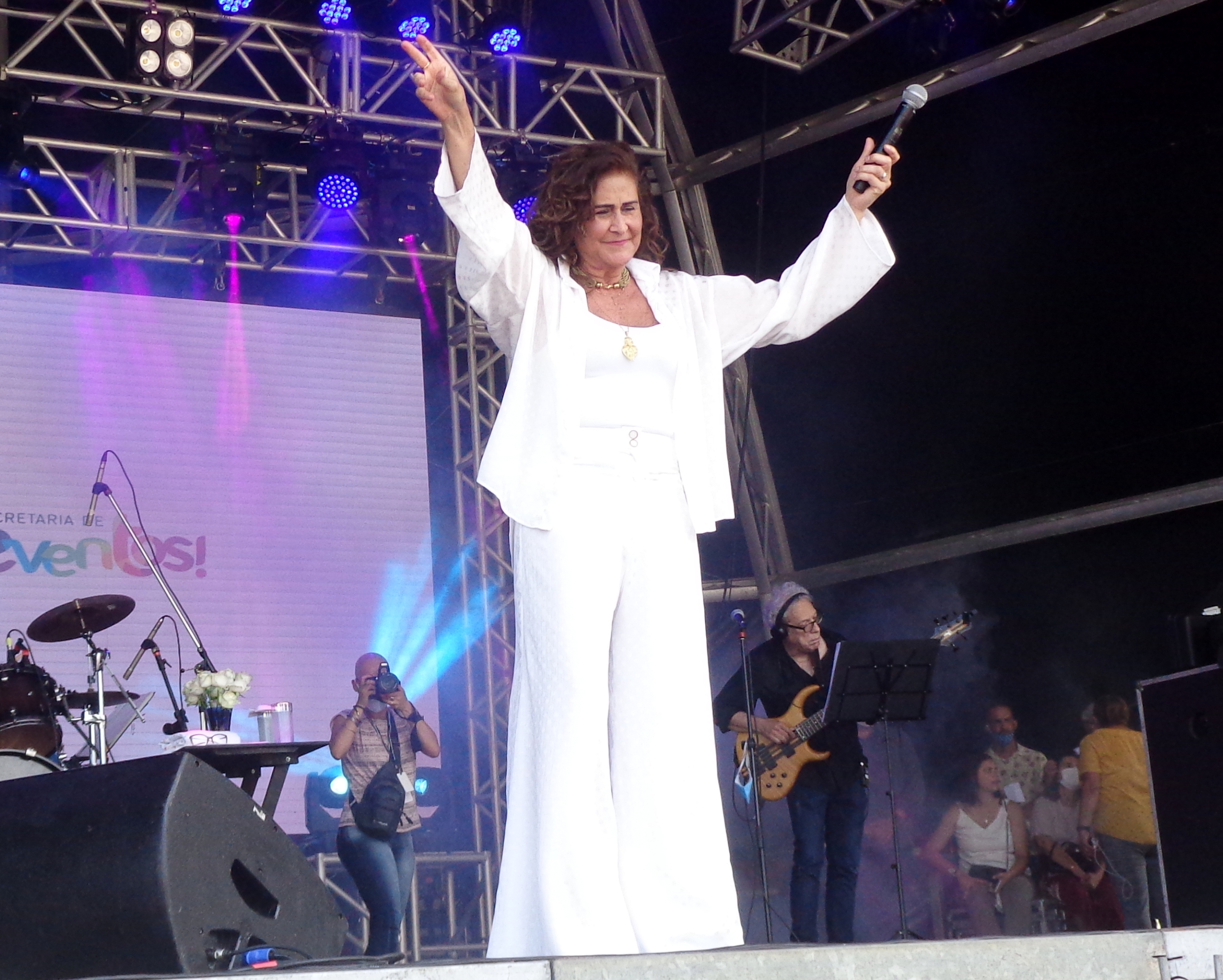
Joanna during live performance (January 2022).

- 1979: Nascente – RCA Victor
- 1980: Estrela Guia – RCA Victor
- 1981: Chama – RCA Victor
- 1982: Vidamor – RCA Victor
- 1983: Brilho e paixão' – RCA Victor
- 1984: Joanna – RCA Victor
- 1985: Joanna – RCA Victor
- 1986: Joanna – RCA Victor
- 1988: Joanna – BMG Ariola
- 1989: Primaveras e verões – BMG Ariola
- 1991: Joanna – BMG Ariola
- 1993: Alma, coração e vida – BMG Ariola
- 1994: Joanna canta Lupicínio – BMG Ariola
- 1995: Sempre no meu coração – BMG Ariola
- 1997: Joanna em Samba-Canção – BMG Ariola
- 1998: Intimidad (Spanish album) – BMG Ariola
- 1999: Joanna 20 Anos (ao vivo) – BMG Ariola
- 2001: Eu estou bem – BMG Ariola
- 2002: Joanna em Oração (ao vivo) – Sony Music
- 2003: Todo Acústico – Sony Music
- 2004: Joanna 25 anos entre Amigos – Sony Music
- 2006: Joanna ao vivo em Portugal – Universal Music
- 2007: Joanna em Pintura Íntima ao vivo'- Som Livre
- 2011: Em Nome de Jesus – Joanna Interpreta Padre Zezinho –
